= Parish of Wamboin =

Coordinates: 35°14′S 149°21′E

Wamboin Parish New South Wales
- LGA(s): Queanbeyan-Palerang Regional Council
- County: Murray
- Division: Eastern
Lands administrative divisions around Wamboin Parish:
Goorooyarroo	Bywong	Lake George
Goorooyarroo	Wamboin Parish	Currandooly
Amungula	Majura	Currandooly

The Parish of Wamboin is a parish of the County of Murray, a cadastral unit for use on land titles. It is located just to the north-east of the Australian Capital Territory and includes part of the town of Bungendore on the eastern edge and the rural community of Wamboin near the south-western edge.

Part of Lake George is the boundary in the north-east. The Yass River is the boundary in the west. Turallo Creek is the boundary in the east. Main roads in the area include Norton Road, Weeroona Drive and the eastern parts of Bungendore Road.

The parish was formerly located in Yarrowlumla Shire, as shown in old parish maps. They also record the area being part of the Gundaroo gold field that was proclaimed on 10 January 1873.
