= Parish of Gigerline =

Coordinates: 35°30′30″S 149°06′00″E

Gigerline Parish Australian Capital Territory
- District: Yarrowlumla Shire (former)
- County: Murray
Localities around Gigerline Parish:
Congwarra (Cowley)	Tuggeranong	Tuggeranong
Tharwa (Cowley)	Gigerline Parish	Burra
Tharwa (Cowley)	Cuppacumbalong (Cowley)	Keewong

Gigerline Parish was a former parish of Murray County, New South Wales, a cadastral unit for use on land titles. It was formed in the nineteenth century and existed until 1 January 1911, when the Seat of Government (Administration) Act 1910 came into force, after the land was transferred to the Commonwealth government in 1909 to be used to form the Australian Capital Territory.

It included what are now the southernmost Canberra suburbs of Banks, Conder, and Gordon, with the northern boundary near Tuggeranong Hill. It was bounded by the Murrumbidgee River in the west and Guises Creek in the south and south-east. It is one of the four former parishes of Murray County which became part of the ACT, along with Canberra, Narrabundah, and Yarrolumla. While other parishes lost land to the ACT, these were the only ones to lose all of the land within the parish.

The Gigerline Nature Reserve is located in a similar region.
