= Parish of Lake George =

Coordinates: 35°05′S 149°25′E

Lake George Parish
- Cadastral division
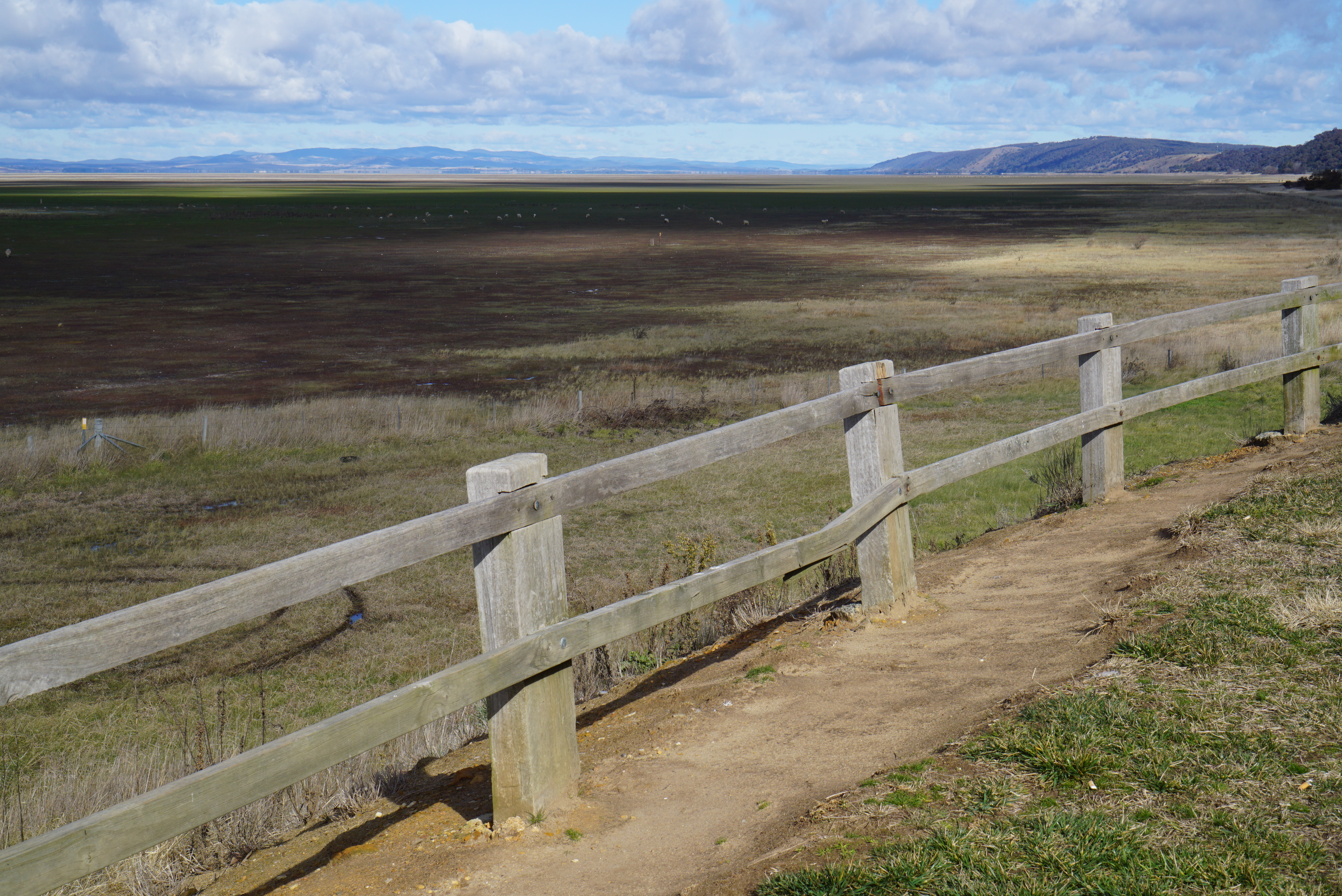
- Parish looking from the north
- Country: Australia
- State: New South Wales
- LGA: Queanbeyan-Palerang Regional Council
- County: Murray
- Division: Eastern
Lands administrative divisions around Lake George Parish
Gundaroo	Currowang (Argyle)	Gundaroo
Purrorumba	Lake George Parish	Ellenden
Bywong	Wamboin	Currandooly

The Parish of Lake George is an Australian parish of the County of Murray which covers Lake George and part of the surrounding area. It is at the northern boundary of the county, with Argyle to the north-east. The Federal Highway runs through the parish where it runs to the west of the lake. Some parish maps of the area just record it as a lake and not as a parish, however it does have separate parish maps.

Gearys Gap lookout, where the federal highway meets Lake George in the south, is just in the parish, on the very edge. From this point for about a mile northward the boundary of the parish is near the road, then further northward the parish includes the Lake George Range to the west of the road as well.

Old parish maps show the area was divided between Yarrowlumla Shire in the south, Gunning Shire in the west and Mulwaree Shire in the north-east. They also note the area was in the Pastures Protection Districts of Braidwood and Goulburn, and a Sanctuary for birds and animals was proclaimed for part of the area on 12 September 1919.
