= Parish of Narrabundah =

Narrabundah Parish Australian Capital Territory
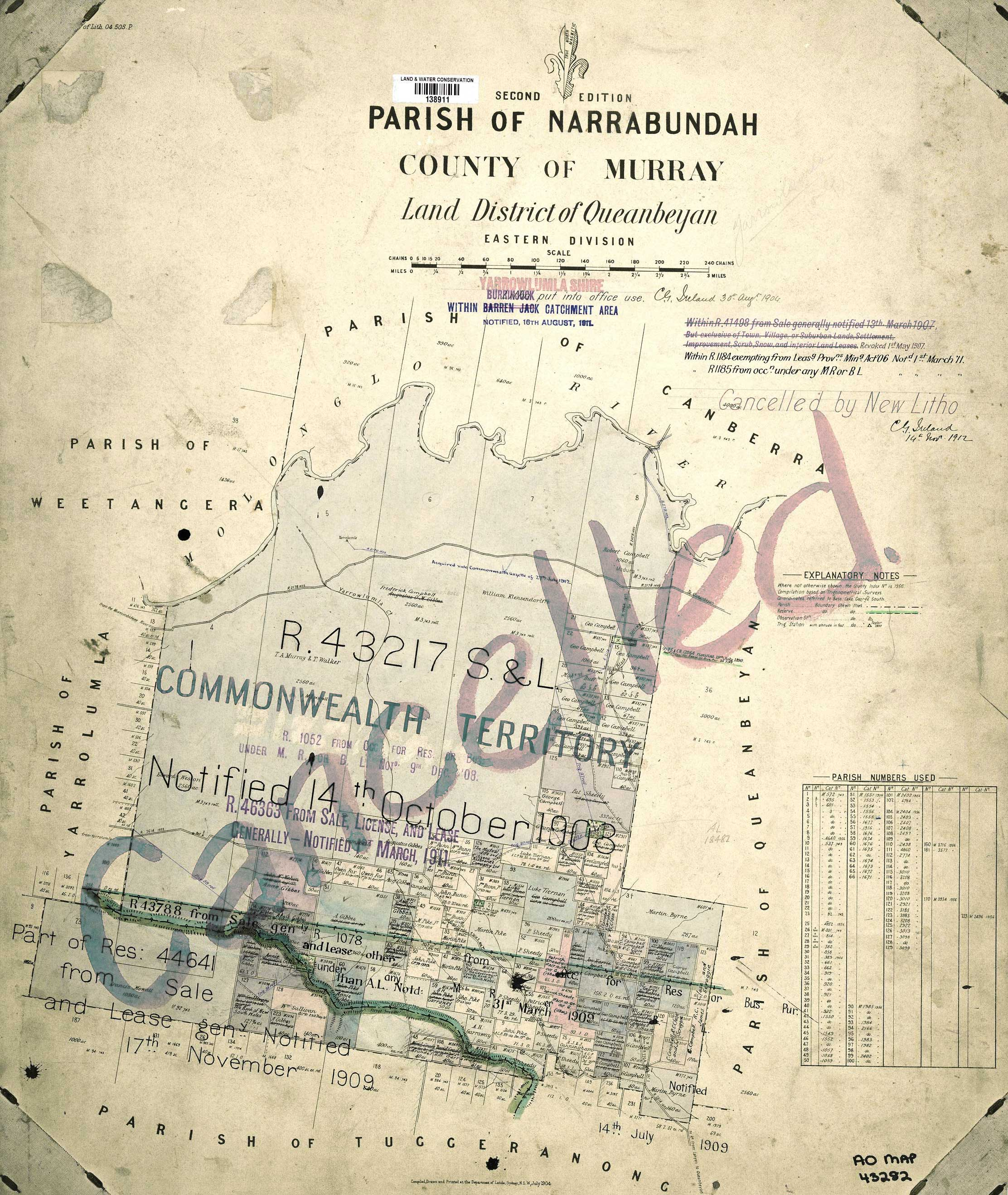
- Map of the parish from 1904
- District: Yarrowlumla Shire (former)
- County: Murray
Localities around Narrabundah Parish:
Ginninderra	Canberra	Pialligo
Yarrolumla	Narrabundah Parish	Queanbeyan
Tuggeranong	Tuggeranong	Tuggeranong

Narrabundah Parish is a former parish of Murray County, New South Wales, a cadastral unit for use on land titles. It was formed in the nineteenth century, and existed until 1 January 1911, when the Seat of Government (Administration) Act 1910 came into force, after the land was transferred to the Commonwealth government in 1909 to be used to form the Australian Capital Territory.

It is one of the four former parishes of Murray County which became part of the ACT, along with Yarrolumla, Canberra and Gigerline. While other parishes lost land to the ACT, these were the only ones to lose all of the land within the parish. It was bounded by the Molonglo River (now Lake Burley Griffin) to the north, and includes most of present-day South Canberra, Weston Creek and Woden including Parliament House, although not the suburb of Narrabundah, which has the same name, but was actually in Queanbeyan parish. The border to the north-east was approximately where Barton is, near Kings Avenue bridge. The eastern boundary was from this point south to just east of Mount Mugga Mugga. The southern boundary of the parish was just south of Mount Taylor, and it included the mountain itself. The southern boundary was also just north of Wanniassa. The south-western tip of the parish was near, but not including, Mount Forster.
