= Parish of Nanima =

Australian parish

Coordinates: 34°57′57″S 149°02′02″E

Nanima Parish is a civil parish of Murray County, New South Wales.

The parish is northwest on the registered rural locality of Nanima, which is located in the parishes of the Toual and Bedulluck. Nanima Parish includes the town of Murrumbateman but extends to the Yass River.

== See also ==
- Nanima, New South Wales
