= Parish of Canberra =

Canberra Parish Australian Capital Territory
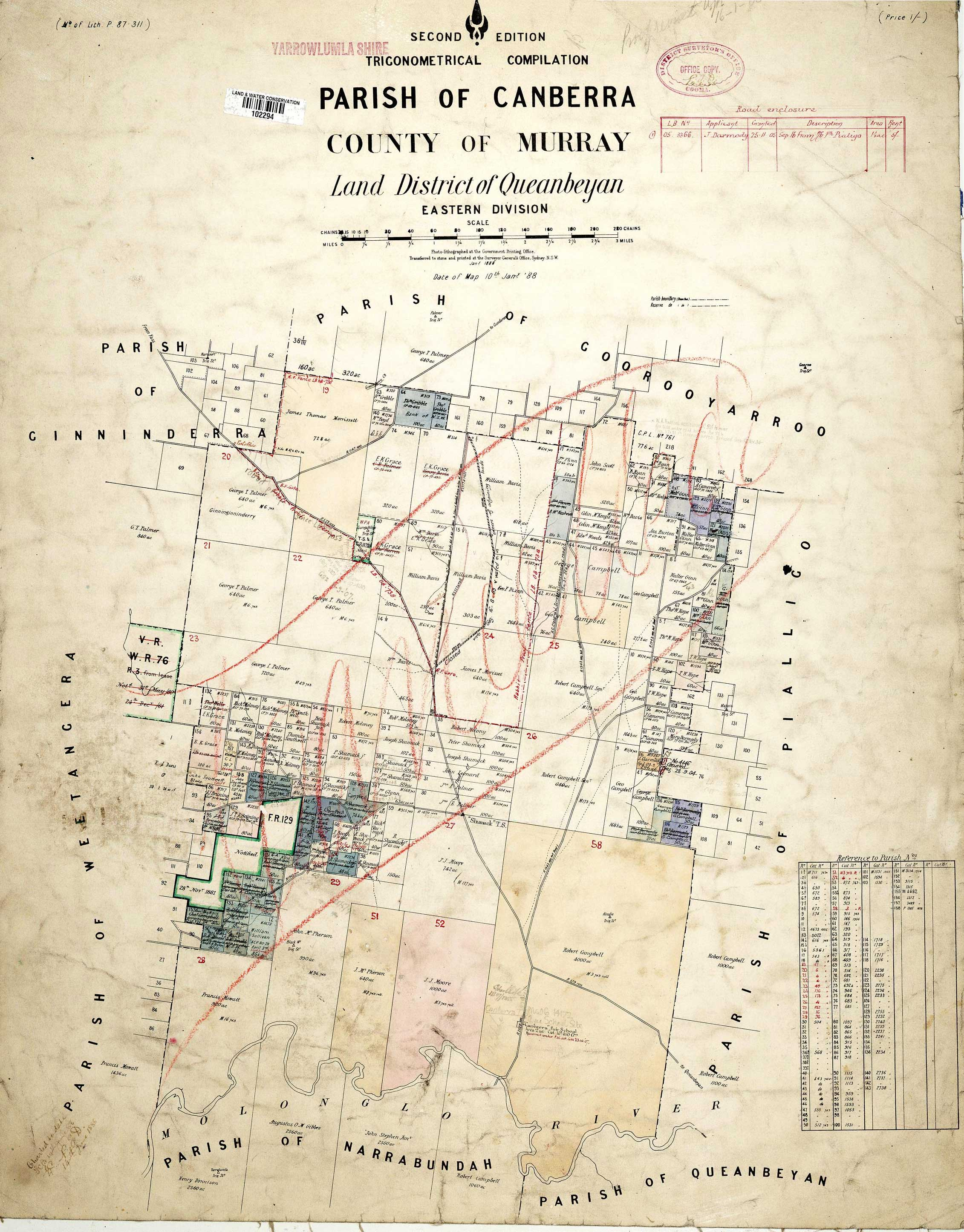
- 1888 map of the parish
- District: Yarrowlumla Shire (former)
- County: Murray
Localities around Canberra Parish:
Ginninderra	Goorooyarroo	Goorooyarroo
Weetangera	Canberra Parish	Pialligo
Yarrolumla	Narrabundah	Queanbeyan

Canberra Parish is a former parish of Murray County, New South Wales, a cadastral unit for use on land titles. It was formed in the nineteenth century, and existed until 1 January 1911, when the Seat of Government (Administration) Act 1910 came into force, after the land was transferred to the Commonwealth government in 1909 to be used to form the Australian Capital Territory.

It is one of the four former parishes of Murray County which became part of the ACT, along with Yarrolumla, Narrabundah and Gigerline. While other parishes lost land to the ACT, these were the only ones to lose all of the land within the parish. It included what is now Civic, as well as most of North Canberra. It was bounded to the south by the Molonglo River (now Lake Burley Griffin), while on the west the boundary was on the western side of Black Mountain, and on the east the boundary was on the eastern side of Mount Ainslie, thus including both mountains. It went as far north as Gungahlin. The boundary to the east ran between Mount Ainslie and Mount Majura, so it did not include Mount Majura.
