= Parish of Amungula =

Administrative area in New South Wales, Australia

Amungula Parish New South Wales
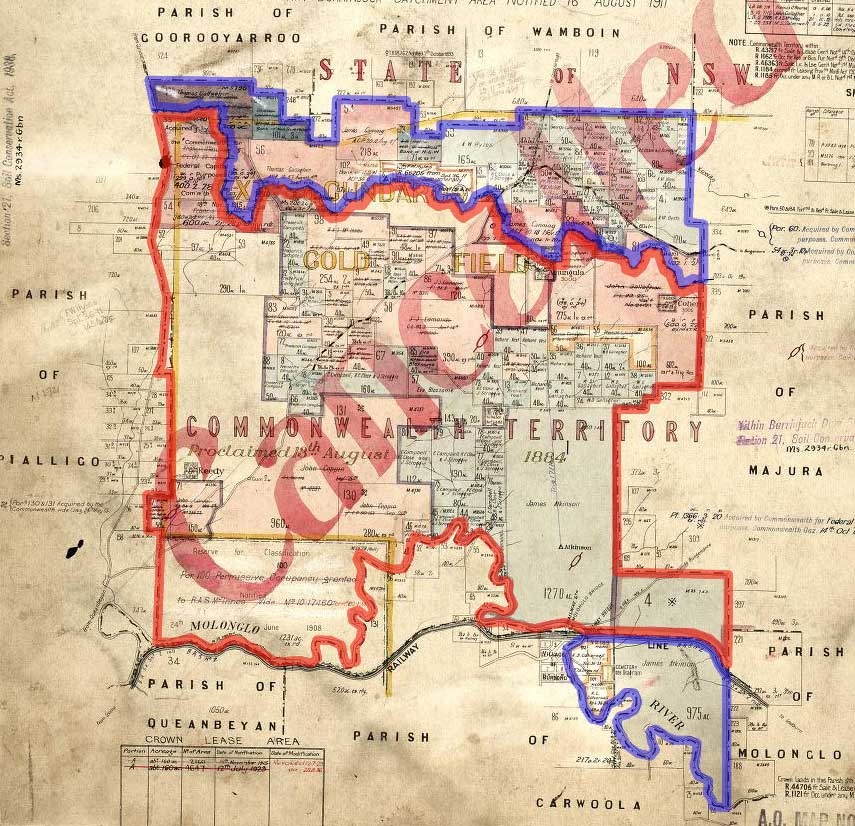
- Early 20th Century cadastral map with highlights: The two sections of Amungula parish since 1909 Formerly part of the parish; transferred to the Commonwealth for the ACT in 1909

- Coordinates: 35°16′54″S 149°18′04″E
- LGA(s): Queanbeyan-Palerang Regional Council
- County: Murray
- Division: Eastern
Lands administrative divisions around Amungula Parish:
Goorooyarroo	Wamboin	Majura
Pialligo	Amungula Parish	Majura
Queanbeyan	Carwoola	Molonglo

Amungula Parish is a parish of Murray County, New South Wales, a cadastral unit for use on land titles. It is located in two non-contiguous sections, divided by the Australian Capital Territory, as most of the parish was transferred to the ACT in 1909 and now makes up much of the Kowen district. The northern section, the larger of the two, is located just to the south of Wamboin around 35°15′50″S 149°17′29″E; the southern, a section of land between the Goulburn-Queanbeyan railway and the Molonglo River around 35°20′48″S 149°19′49″E. Before 1909, the Molonglo River was the southern boundary of the parish. The Kings Highway passes through a small part of the southern remaining portion. It was formerly located in Yarrowlumla Shire, but is now located in Queanbeyan-Palerang Regional Council.

== See also ==
- Land District of Queanbeyan
