= Parish of Pialligo =

Coordinates: 35°13′22″S 149°12′29″E

Pialligo Parish New South Wales
- LGA(s): Queanbeyan-Palerang Regional Council
- County: Murray
Lands administrative divisions around Pialligo Parish:
Goorooyarroo	Goorooyarroo	Wamboin
Canberra	Pialligo Parish	Amungula
Narrabundah	Queanbeyan	Carwoola

Pialligo Parish is a parish of Murray County, New South Wales, a cadastral unit for use on land titles. It is now a very tiny piece of land to the north-east of the Australian Capital Territory after most of the land in the parish was transferred to the ACT in 1911. It once included the area to the east of Mount Ainslie and the north of the Molonglo River, including Mount Majura and what is now Canberra Airport, and the suburb of Pialligo.
