= Parish of Yarrolumla =

Coordinates: 35°19′00″S 148°59′13″E

Yarrolumla Parish Australian Capital Territory
- County: Murray
Localities around Yarrolumla Parish:
Urayarra (Cowley)	Weetangera	Canberra
Urayarra (Cowley)	Yarrolumla Parish	Narrabundah
Congwarra (Cowley)	Congwarra (Cowley)	Tuggeranong

Yarrolumla Parish is a former parish of Murray County, New South Wales, a cadastral unit for use on land titles. It was formed in the nineteenth century, and existed until 1 January 1911, when the Seat of Government (Administration) Act 1910 came into force, after the land was transferred to the Commonwealth government in 1909 to be used to form the Australian Capital Territory.

It is one of the four former parishes of Murray County which became part of the ACT, along with Canberra, Narrabundah and Gigerline. While other parishes lost land to the ACT, these were the only ones to lose all of the land within the parish. It was bounded to the north by the Molonglo River, and to the west and south by the Murrumbidgee River. It includes the area around Mount Stromlo, and the north-western part of Weston Creek, including Duffy. It does not actually include the present day suburb of Yarralumla, which was in Narrabundah parish, but it was close to it.
