= Parish of Weetangera =

Coordinates: 35°12′22″S 148°57′35″E

Weetangera Parish New South Wales
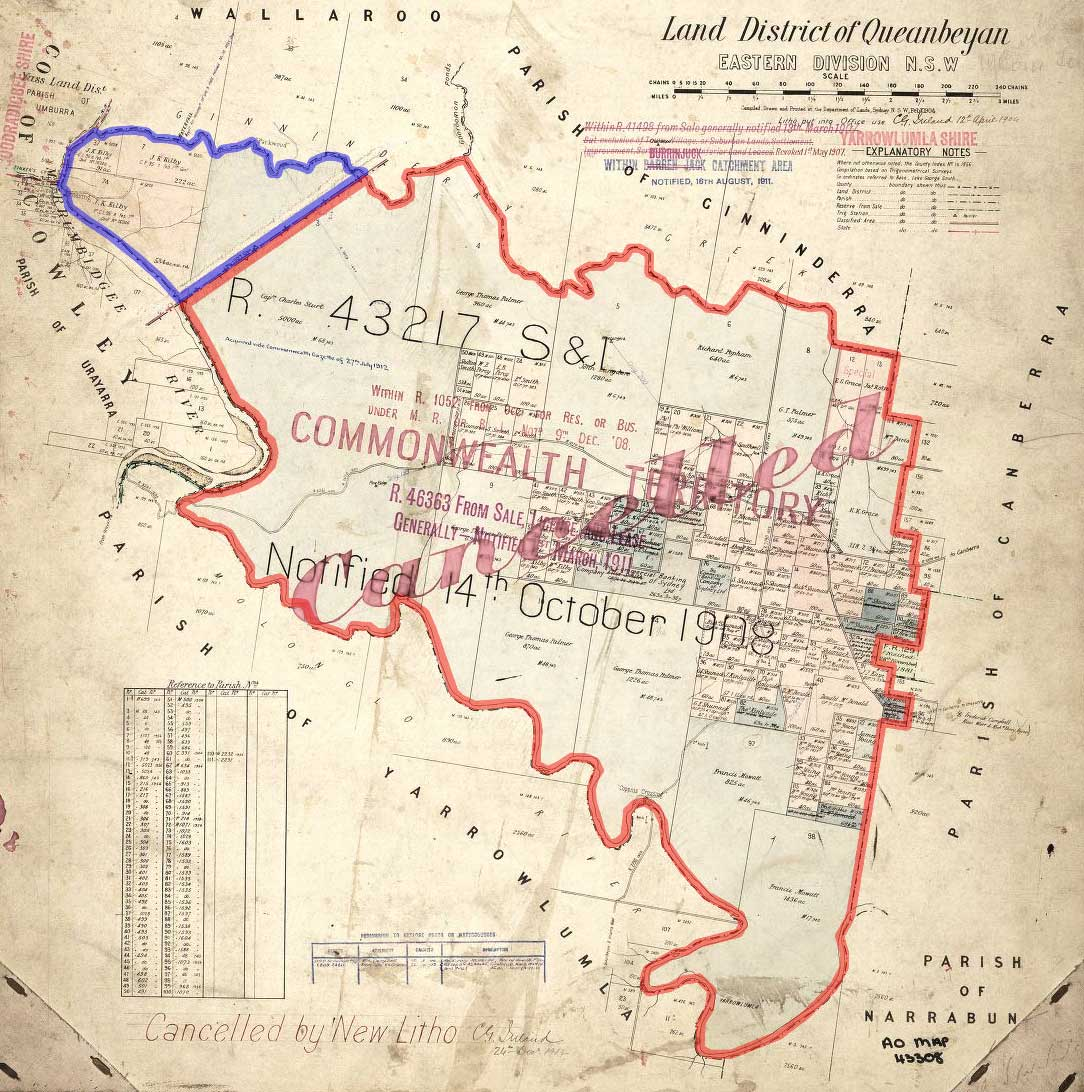
- The Parish of Weetangera since 1909 Formerly part of the parish; transferred to the Commonwealth for the ACT in 1909
- LGA(s): Yass Valley Council
- County: Murray
Lands administrative divisions around Weetangera Parish:
Wallaroo	Ginninderra	Canberra
Urayarra (Cowley)	Weetangera Parish	Canberra
Urayarra (Cowley)	Yarrolumla	Narrabundah

Weetangera Parish is a parish of Murray County, New South Wales, Australia, a cadastral unit for use on land titles. It is now very small, after most of the land in the parish was transferred to the Australian Capital Territory in 1911, but it once included the south-west part of what is now the Canberra town centre of Belconnen including the town centre. It currently includes a small section of land in New South Wales between the ACT border, Ginninderra Creek and the Murrumbidgee River.

== Former boundaries ==
Before 1911, it included the area between Ginninderra Creek to the north and the Molonglo River to the south, with the Murrumbidgee River on the west, and land near what is currently the suburb of Aranda to the east. The name is still used today in the suburb of Weetangera, which was a small part of the much larger parish. In addition it included all of the present day suburbs of Holt, Higgins, Scullin, Florey, Hawker, Macquarie, and Cook, and the parts of Macgregor and Latham that are south of Ginninderra Creek.
