= Sutton, New South Wales =

Sutton New South Wales
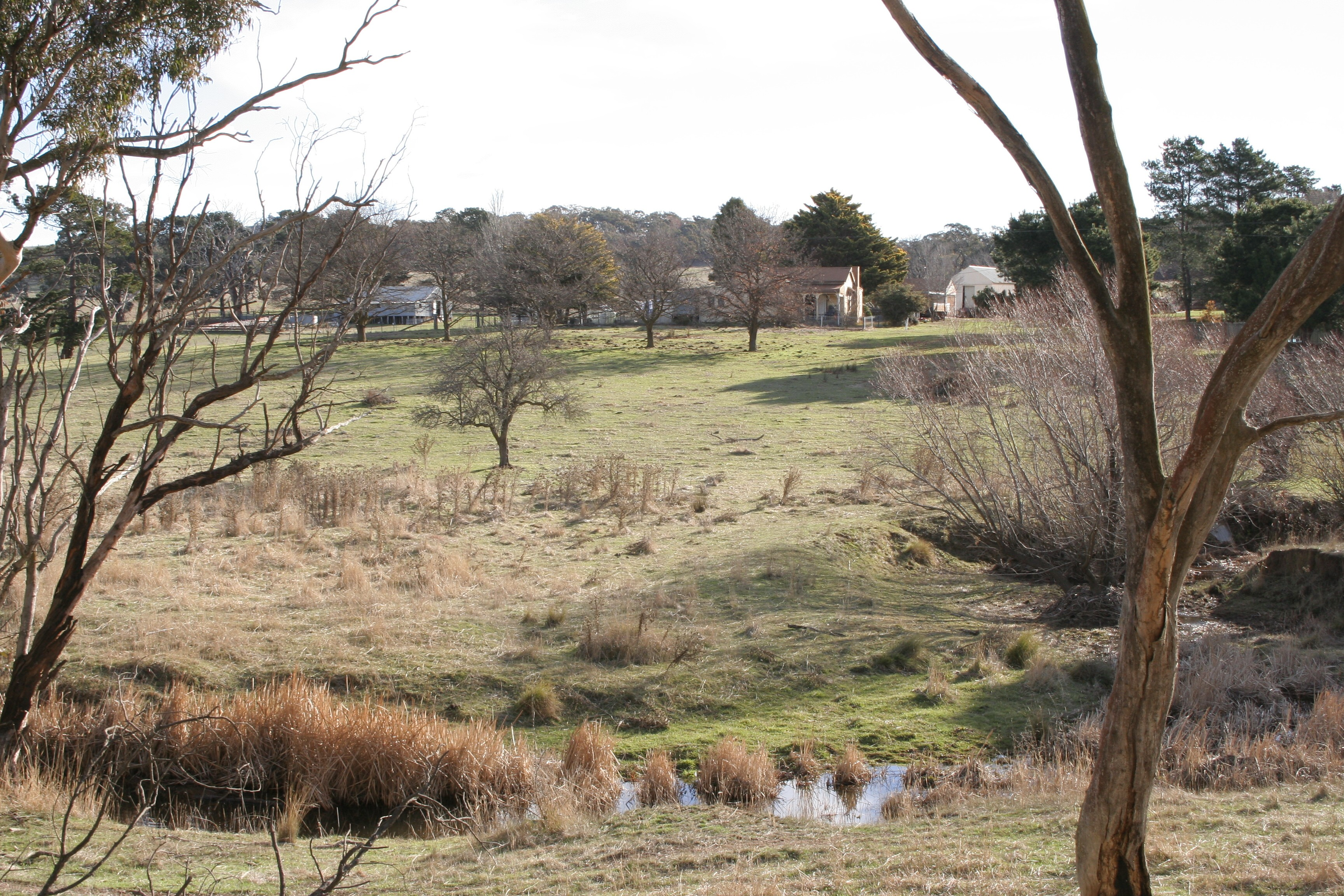
- Oak Hill, southwest of Sutton on Majura Lane

- Coordinates: 35°09′00″S 149°15′00″E
- Population: 284 (UCL 2021)
- Postcode(s): 2620
- Elevation: 613 m (2,011 ft)
- Location: 18 km (11 mi) NE of Canberra; 64 km (40 mi) W of Goulburn; 17 km (11 mi) S of Gundaroo; 230 km (143 mi) SW of Sydney
- LGA(s): Yass Valley; Queanbeyan–Palerang
- County: Murray
- Parish: Goorooyarroo
- State electorate(s): Goulburn; Monaro
- Federal division(s): Eden-Monaro; Riverina
Localities around Sutton:
Nanima	Gundaroo	Gundaroo
Springrange	Sutton	Bywong
Gungahlin	Majura	Wamboin

Sutton is a small village in the Southern Tablelands of New South Wales, Australia in Yass Valley Shire. It is situated on the west bank of the Yass River, about 17 kilometres south of Gundaroo, near the Federal Highway, not far from Canberra. It has a primary school, an Anglican church (St Peter's), a general store, an estate agent, an artists gallery (Sutton Village Gallery), and a baker. Sutton has its own volunteer Bush Fire Brigade located in the village.

Sutton began as a land reservation, surveyed by Robert Hoddle in 1835. In July 1866 the land reserve was again surveyed, this time by Edward Twynam who named the area after Joseph Sutton, the first person to come along the road at the time of the survey. He was a local resident, living at the Woodbury homestead, and son-in-law to William Guise, owner of Bywong Estate.

The village of Sutton was officially gazetted in July 1867. Sutton public school was founded in 1870 as a provisional school and has existed continuously since 1880. The layout of the village has changed slightly over the past 150 years. Street names acknowledged Royalty, officials, pioneers and local gold rushes.

At the 2016 census, Sutton "state suburb" (including its surrounding area, which is partly south of the Federal Highway in Queanbeyan–Palerang Regional Council) had a population of 1,660. It had a median age of 44, with children aged under 15 years making up 17% of the population and people aged 65 years and over making up 16% of the population. Of the families in Sutton, 51% were couple families with children, 40% were couple families without children and 8% were one-parent families.

Sutton is bordered by the Australian Capital Territory, Wamboin, Bywong and Gundaroo. Sutton Park is about 5 minutes from the locality of Sutton. It has a population of around 180 people.
