= Parish of Wallaroo =

Wallaroo Parish New South Wales
- LGA(s): Yass Valley Council
- County: Murray
Lands administrative divisions around Wallaroo Parish:
Umburra (Cowley)	Jeir	Jeir
Umburra (Cowley)	Wallaroo Parish	Ginninderra
Umburra (Cowley)	Weetangera	Ginninderra

Wallaroo Parish is one of the 54 parishes of Murray County, New South Wales, a cadastral unit for use on land titles. It is bounded by the Murrumbidgee River in the west, Ginninderra Creek in the south and Gooromon Ponds in the east. The Australian Capital Territory has also formed a small part of the boundary since 1909, after a small part of land in the parish at 35°11′54″S 149°00′00″E was transferred to the Commonwealth. This area is just to the west of Dunlop. The Wallaroo road is the main road in the area, which comes off the Barton Highway. The parish is similar to the locality of Wallaroo.
