= Cowley County =

Cowley County may refer to:

- Cowley County, Kansas
- Cowley County, New South Wales
