= Parish of Goorooyarroo =

Goorooyarroo Parish New South Wales
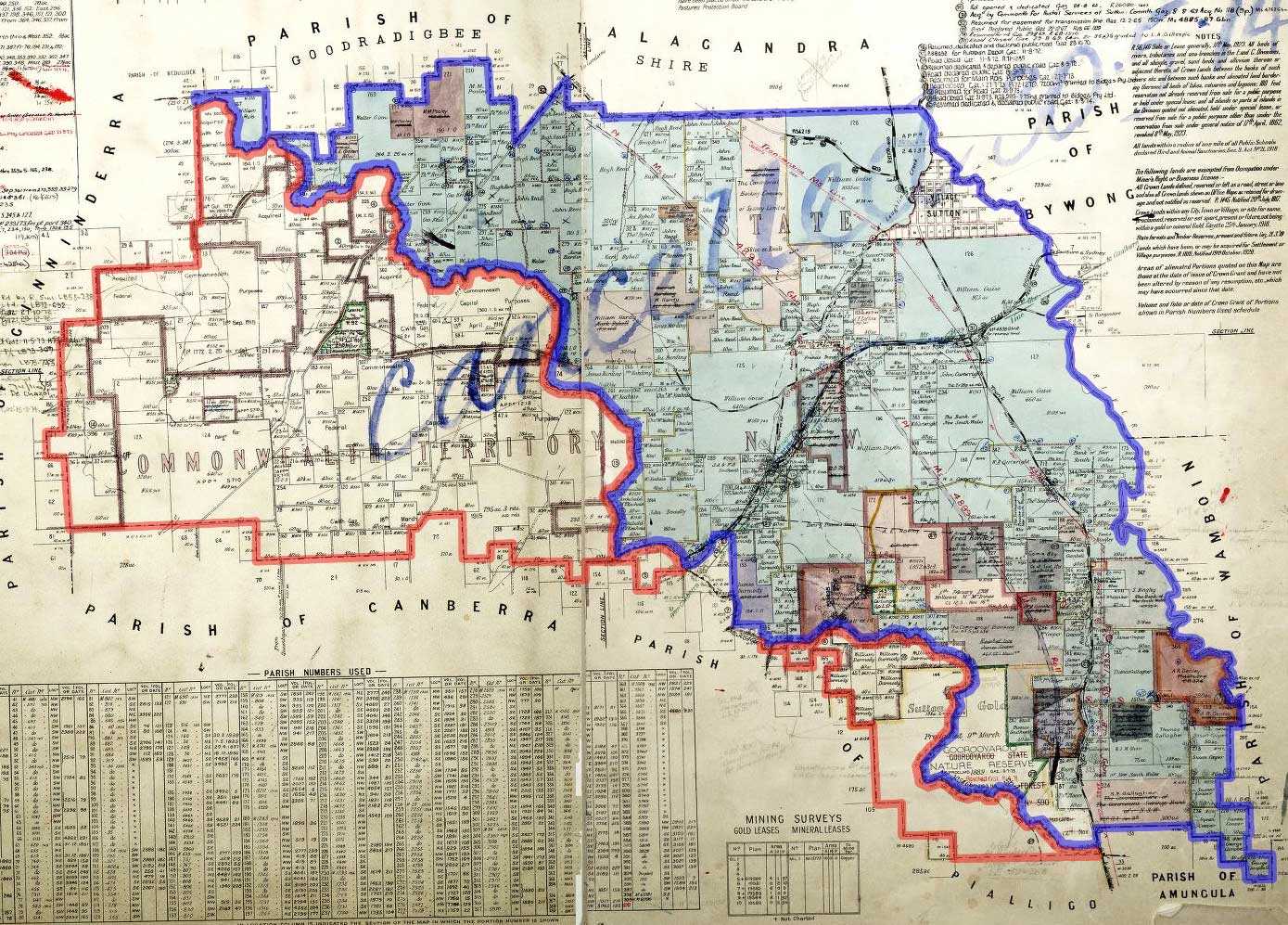
- 1932 cadastral map with highlights: Boundary of Goorooyarroo parish since 1909 Formerly part of the parish; transferred to the Commonwealth for the ACT in 1909
- LGA(s): Yarrowlumla Shire (former)
- County: Murray
- Division: Eastern
Lands administrative divisions around Goorooyarroo Parish:
Ginninderra	Talagandra	Bywong
Ginninderra	Goorooyarroo Parish	Wamboin
Canberra	Pialligo	Amungula

Goorooyarroo Parish is a parish of Murray County, New South Wales, a cadastral unit for use on land titles.

== Geography ==
It is located to the north-east of the Australian Capital Territory.

== History ==
About a third of the parish was transferred to the Federal Capital Territory (later renamed the Australian Capital Territory) in 1909, which included what is now the northern suburbs of Gungahlin.

A small part of the New South Wales electoral districts of Monaro and Burrinjuck were in the parish as of 2007 as mentioned in their electoral district profiles.

The parish's name is commemorated by two areas of nature reserve, each called Goorooyarroo (NSW) and Mulligan's Flat / Goorooyarroo Nature Reserve (ACT), which were originally part of the parish.

== Research ==
In Mulligans Flat Nature Reserve within the ACT, the Mulligan's Flat - Goorooyarroo Woodland Experiment is conducting research into remnant plant and animal life in the area, notably reintroduction of the eastern bettong (marsupial) and brown treecreeper (bird), and remnant yellow box (Eucalyptus melliodora) and Blakely's red gum (Eucalyptus blakelyi). This study is led from the Fenner School of Environment and Society at the Australian National University, along with involvement from the CSIRO and ACT Government.
