= Parish of Majura =

Coordinates: 35°18′30″S 149°25′44″E

Majura Parish New South Wales
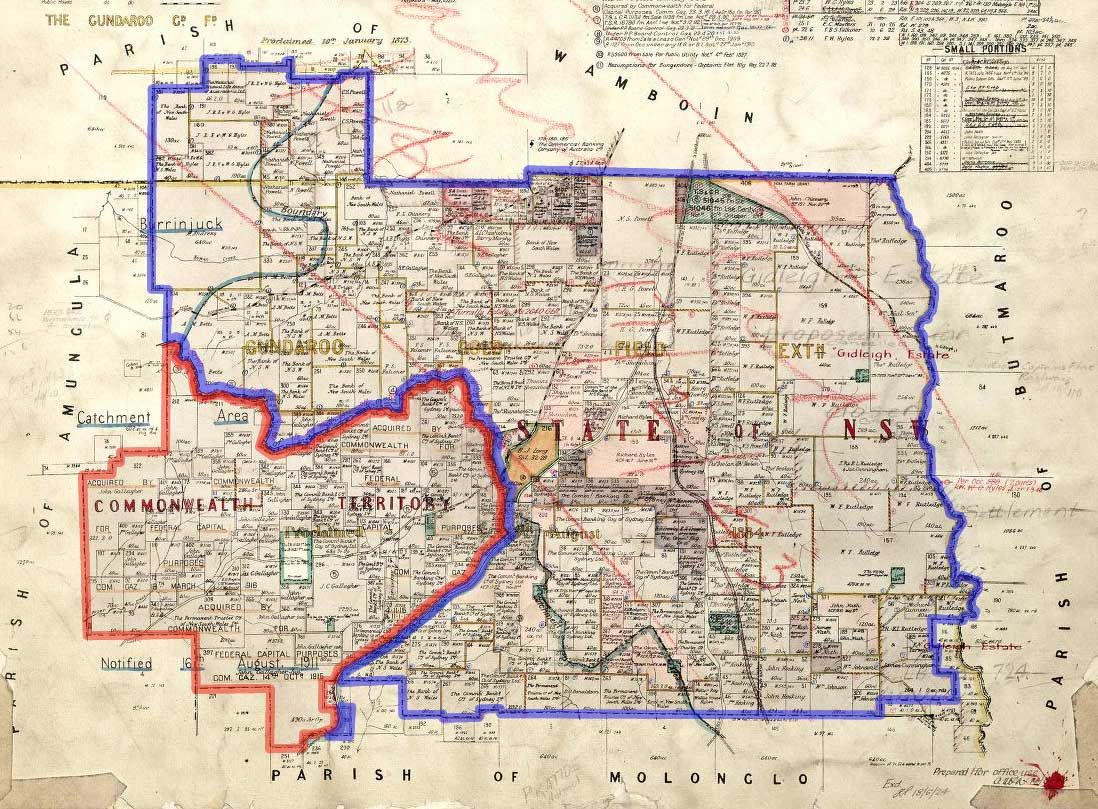
- 1924 cadastral map with highlights: Boundary of Majura parish since 1909 The eastern tip of the ACT, which was formerly part of the parish; transferred to the Commonwealth in 1909
- LGA(s): Queanbeyan-Palerang Regional Council
- County: Murray
- Division: Eastern
Lands administrative divisions around Majura Parish:
| Wamboin | Wamboin | Butmaroo |
| Amungula | Majura Parish | Butmaroo |
| Amungula | Molonglo | Butmaroo |

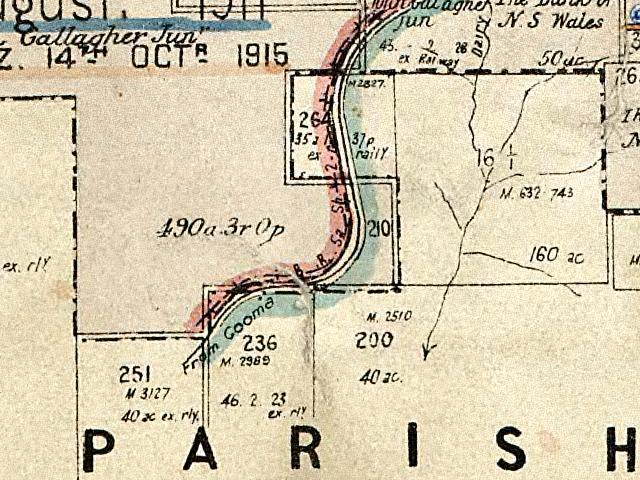
Portion 210 of Majura Parish is an exclave, cut off from the rest by the railway line-border of the ACT

Majura Parish is a parish of Murray County, New South Wales, a cadastral unit for use on land titles. It is located to the east of the extreme eastern tip of the ACT. The Queanbeyan-Bungendore railway line and the Kings Highway pass through the parish. About a quarter of the original nineteenth-century parish was transferred to the ACT in 1909. The land transferred was the area between the railway line in the south and the watershed of the Molonglo River in the north. This cut off part of portion 210 of Majura Parish from the rest, giving the parish a small exclave.

At the time of the transfer of land, it was located in Yarrowlumla Shire, but is now in Queanbeyan-Palerang Regional Council.
