= Jeir =

- Suburb
- Coordinates: 35°03′13″S 148°58′46″E
- Country: Australia
- State: New South Wales
- LGA: Yass Valley Council
- Location: 32 km (20 mi) NW of Canberra; 45 km (28 mi) SE of Yass; 295 km (183 mi) SW of Sydney

Government
  - State electorate: Goulburn
  - Federal division: Riverina
- Elevation: 589 m (1,932 ft)

Population
  - Total: 271 (SAL 2021)
- Postcode: 2582
- County: Murray
- Parish: Jeir
Suburbs around Jeir
	Murrumbateman	Nanima
Cavan	Jeir	Springrange
Mullion	Wallaroo

Jeir (/dʒɪər/) is a rural locality in the Southern Tablelands of New South Wales, Australia in the Yass Valley Shire. It is north of Canberra and south of Yass and Murrumbateman on the western side of the Barton Highway and the eastern side of the Murrumbidgee River. At the 2016 census, it had a population of 259.
