= Murrumbateman =

- Town
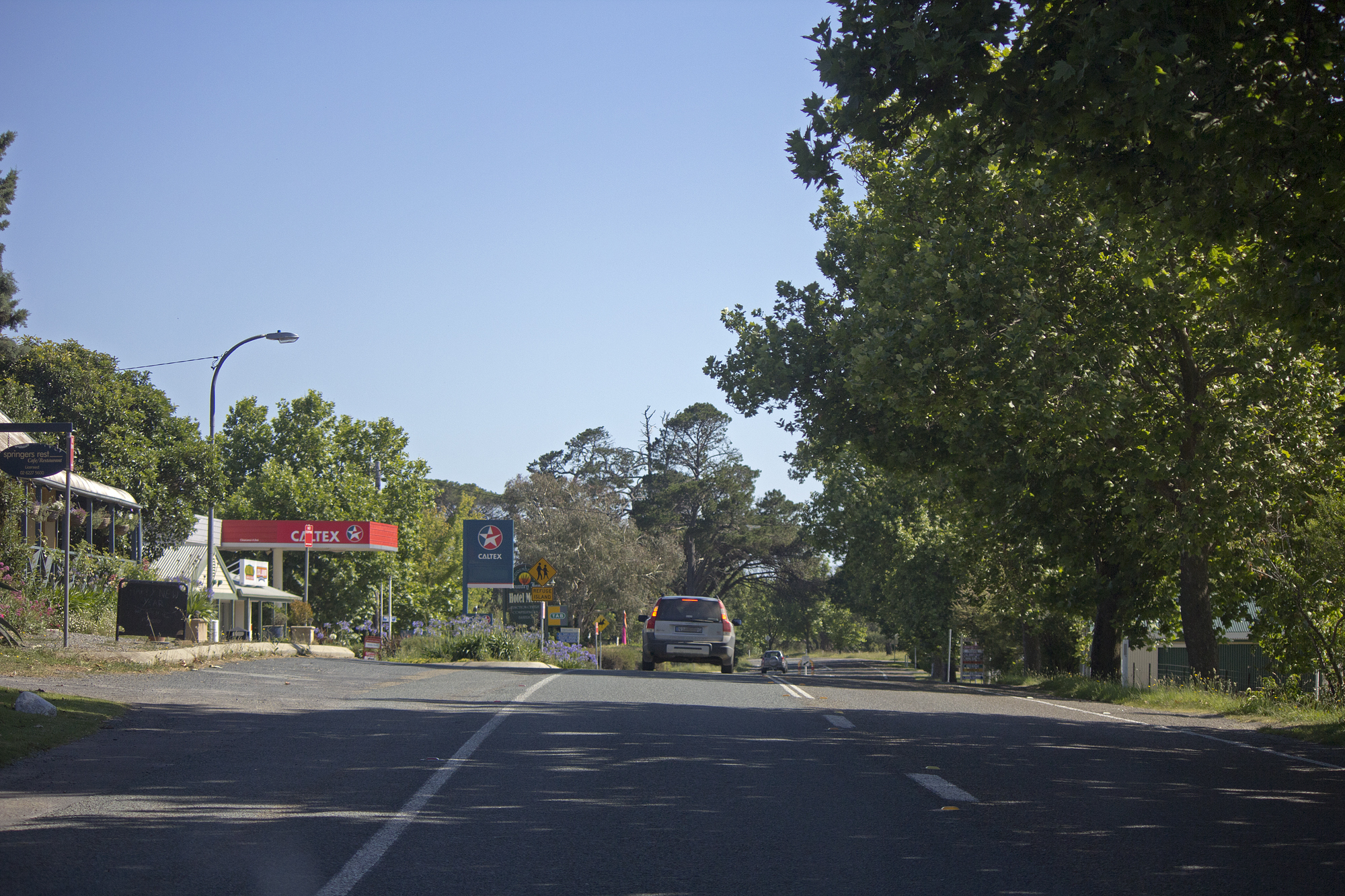
- Barton Highway in Murrumbateman

- Coordinates: 34°57′0″S 149°01′0″E
- Country: Australia
- State: New South Wales
- LGA: Yass Valley Council
- Location: 288 km (179 mi) SW of Sydney; 30 km (19 mi) N of Canberra; 21 km (13 mi) SE of Yass

Government
  - State electorate: Goulburn
  - Federal division: Riverina
- Elevation: 570 m (1,870 ft)

Population
  - Total: 3,607 (2021 census)
- Postcode: 2582
- County: Murray
- Parish: Namima, Murrumbateman
Localities around Murrumbateman
Marchmont	Yass River	Yass River
Boambolo	Murrumbateman	Nanima
Cavan	Jeir	Springrange

Murrumbateman is a town in the Southern Tablelands of New South Wales, Australia. It is on the Barton Highway, approximately 30 kilometres north-west of Canberra, and is part of the Yass Valley Shire. At the 2021 census, Murrumbateman had a population of 3,607.

== History and economy ==
With the arrival of European settlers in the 19th century sheep farming, wheat growing and goldmining became major economic activities. The first government school opened in 1869.

Winemaking began in Murrumbateman in the 1970s with some of the surrounding rural properties being developed as grape growing areas or as boutique wineries.

In recent years much of the land has been subdivided into small hobby farm blocks ranging from 2 to 40 acres (0.81 to 16.19 ha). Similar subdivisions have occurred in other regions around Canberra including Bungendore, Sutton, Gundaroo and Burra. Residents tend to commute to Canberra for work rather than make a living off the small parcels of land. Other nearby towns are Yass, Gunning and Dalton.

Murrumbateman has a pub and a handful of retail outlets.

The Murrumbateman Market is held fortnightly at the Recreation Ground. The market focus is on local produce and local arts and crafts but there is always a range of products from the wider Yass Valley and beyond including fruit and vegetables, breads, cakes, jams, olives, chillies, sauces, biodynamic beef and a range of wines from the local area plus woollen and alpaca products and handmade goods of all types.

== Annual events ==
- The Murrumbateman Pony Club hold an annual show jumping festival in June. The event is open for Pony Club Members.
- The Murrumbateman Field Days is held in October each year and draws large crowds from Canberra and Yass
- The Australian Cool Climate Wine Show is held annually in September

== Facilities and services ==
The trees around the recreation grounds are heritage listed and parking underneath them is not recommended.

Murrumbateman has the following Sporting and Social clubs:

- Murrumbateman Pony Club
- Murrumbateman Adult Riding Club
- Murrumbateman Stormers - Little Athletics Club
- Murrumbateman Scouts
- Murrumbateman Eagles AFL Club
- Murrumbateman Cricket Club

Murrumbateman has the following Community facilities and services:

- Murrumbateman Mens Shed
- Pre-school
- Primary School
- Library
- Catholic Church
- Uniting Church
- Landcare group
- Park
- Public toilets
- Rural Fire Service

The town is serviced by several business including:

- Murrumbateman Produce
- Bill Wheatley Motors
- Local Supermarket and Butcher and BP Fuel
- Murrumbateman Medical and Pharmacy
- Local Bakeries
- Cafe
- Takeaway
- Hairdresser
- Convenience store
- Murrumbateman Country Inn
- Abode Motel

== Media ==
Murrumbateman receives five free-to-air television networks including all the digital free-to-air channels relayed from Canberra, and broadcast from Black Mountain. Networks available include ABC, SBS, Seven, WIN, and Network 10.

The town receives radio stations from Canberra such as ABC Radio Canberra, Hit 104.7, Mix 106.3, KIX Country, and 2CA. Community radio is provided by Yass FM which is broadcast from Yass.

Local newspaper is served by the Yass Valley Times.

== Recent development ==
The Fairley Square includes a commercial precinct including a bakery, childcare center, a cafe, a gym, medical practice. There is also a real estate agent and a law firm situated in Fairley Square.

== Population ==
In the 2021 Census, there were 3,607 people in Murrumbateman, of which 99 were of Aboriginal and/or Torres Strait Islander origin and 2,999 people were born in Australia. 616 people in Murrumbateman conduct volunteer work. The next most common country of birth was England at 89 people followed by New Zealand (31 people).

== Notable people ==
- Sir Walter Merriman – sheep breeder, knighted in 1954 for his contributions to the fine wool industry, and founder of the Merryville stud, Murrumbateman
- David Pereira - Australian cellist
