= Deuchar Gordon =

- Born: 19 June 1871; Braidwood, New South Wales
- Died: 11 September 1951 (aged 80); Potts Point, New South Wales
- Education: Newington College
- Occupations: Pastoralist; Company Director
- Spouse: Charlotte Louise (née Campbell)
- Children: 2 sons and 2 daughters
- Parent(s): William Forbes Gordon and Beatrice Deuchar (née Allan)

William Deuchar Gordon (19 June 1871 – 11 September 1951) was an Australian pastoralist. He was born into a socially prominent New South Wales rural family and was president of the Australian Club.

== Early life ==
Gordon was born at the now heritage listed rural homestead Manar House near Braidwood, New South Wales, the second son of William Forbes Gordon and Beatrice Deuchar (née Allan) and was always known by his second Christian name of Deuchar. The Gordon family had arrived in New South Wales in 1836 from Scotland. He attended Newington College in 1882 during the presidency of the Rev Joseph Horner Fletcher and headmastership of Joseph Coates. After finishing school he worked as a book-keeper and accountant before returning to work on the land.

== Pastoralist ==
In 1891, Gordon returned to Manar and remained there until his marriage in 1901 to Charlotte Louise (Bunty) Campbell. The Gordons lived for the next decade at Werriwa homestead, another family property near Bungendore, and had four children. In 1912 they returned to Manar where Gordon lived until his death. During that time he consolidated and expanded his land holding to 26,000 acres. On his death, Gordon left an estate of £258,727.

== Community service ==
In 1905, Gordon became a Justice of the Peace. He served as President of the Braidwood Hospital Board, Chairman of the Pastures Protection Board and Chairman of the Braidwood branch of the Graziers Association of NSW.

== Company director ==
Gordon accepted the seat on the Board of Perpetual Trustee Company (Limited) that was made vacant by the resignation of Joe Abbott on his appointment to the Federal Cabinet.
