= Parish of Tuggeranong =

Coordinates: 35°25′54″S 149°10′04″E

Tuggeranong Parish New South Wales
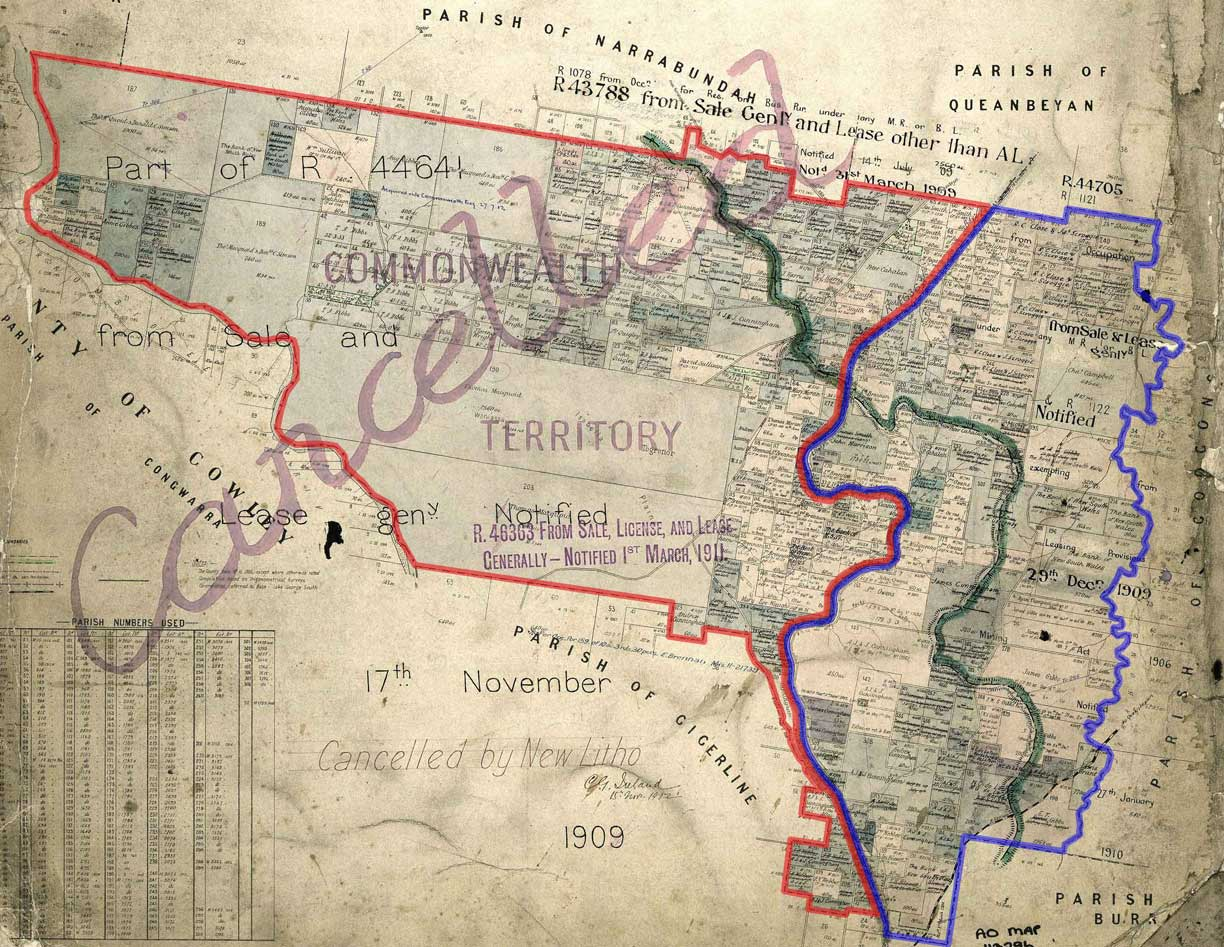
- 1904 cadastral map with highlights: Boundary of Tuggeranong parish since 1909 Formerly part of the parish; transferred to the Commonwealth for the ACT in 1909
- LGA(s): City of Queanbeyan
- County: Murray
Lands administrative divisions around Tuggeranong Parish:
Yarrolumla	Narrabundah	Queanbeyan
Congwarra (Cowley)	Tuggeranong Parish	Googong
Congwarra (Cowley)	Gigerline	Burra

Tuggeranong Parish is a parish of Murray County, New South Wales, a cadastral unit for use on land titles. It is now about a third of the size it was in the nineteenth century, after most of the land in the parish was transferred to the Australian Capital Territory in 1911. It currently includes a small section of land in New South Wales between the ACT border (Queanbeyan-Cooma railway line) and Jerrabomberra Creek, but once included most of what is now the Canberra town centre of Tuggeranong.

== Former boundaries ==
Before 1911, its border to the west was the Murrumbidgee River and its border to the east Jerrabomberra Creek. The southern boundary was in what is today the suburb of Gordon, near Tuggeranong Hill. The northern boundary was just north of Wanniassa and south of Mount Taylor.
