= Parish of Keewong =

Keewong Parish
- Cadastral division
- Country: Australia
- State: New South Wales
- LGA: Queanbeyan-Palerang Regional Council
- County: Murray
Lands administrative divisions around Keewong Parish
Gigerline	Burra	Urialla
Cuppacumbalong (Cowley)	Keewong Parish	Urialla
Monkellan	Monkellan	Tantangera

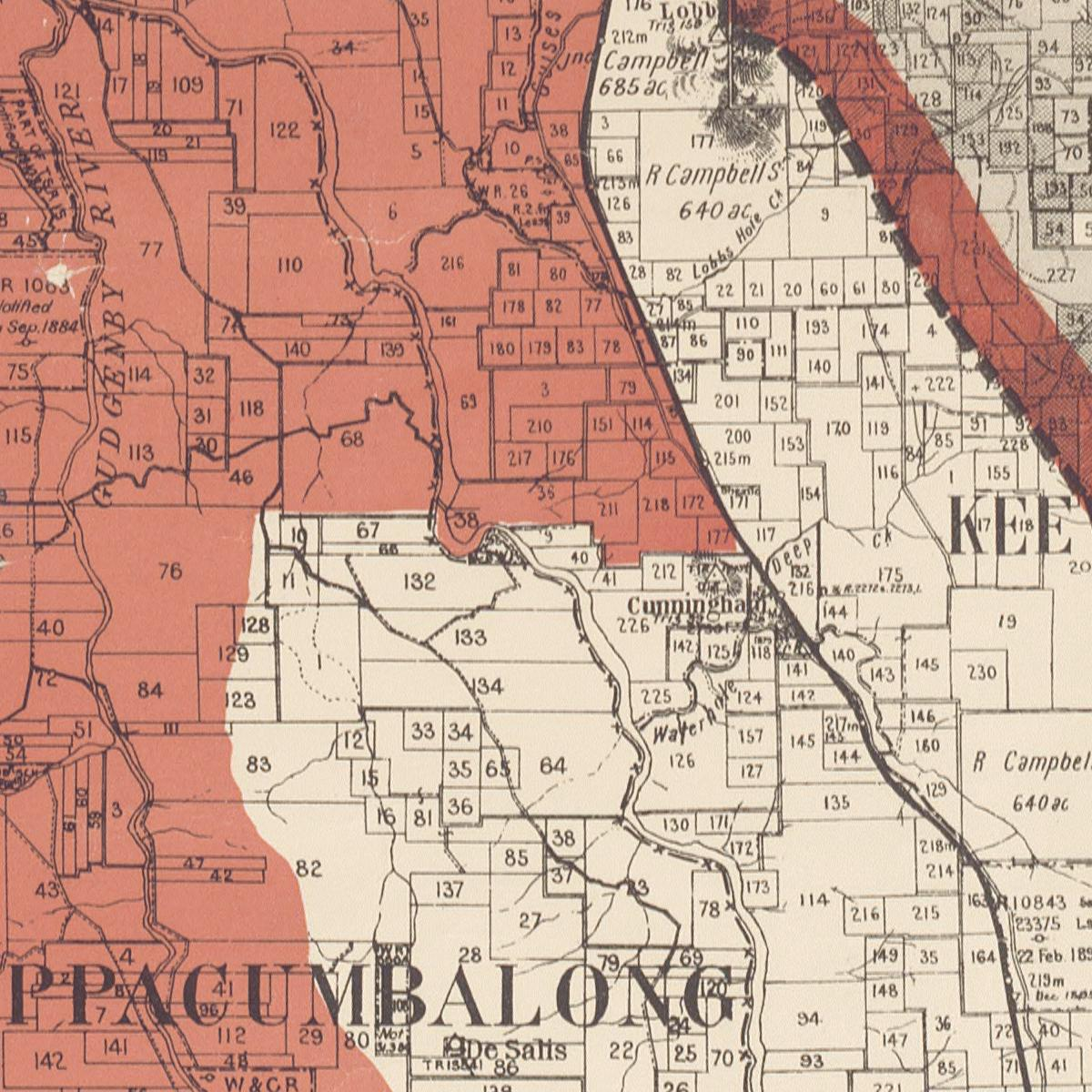
Keewong Parish shown on part of the right side of this map - to the east of the Murrumbidgee River. The word cut off with only 'Kee' visible. The area in red became part of the ACT, which included part of Keewong.

Keewong Parish is a parish of Murray County, New South Wales, a cadastral unit for use on land titles. A small part of the north-western end of the parish around 35°34′40″S 149°07′28″E between the Murrumbidgee River and the Queanbeyan-Cooma railway line was transferred to the Australian Capital Territory in 1909. The southern ends of portions 177, 218, 211, 36, and 38 in the Parish of Keewong form part of the border of the ACT with New South Wales, which is mentioned in the Seat of Government Acceptance Act 1909.

Part of the parish still is located on the eastern side of the Murrumbidgee. Waterhole creek is the south-western boundary, and Burra Creek the eastern boundary. Guise's Creek and Lobb's Hole Creek were originally the boundaries in the north-west, before that part of the land was transferred to the Commonwealth.
