= Parish of Currandooly =

- Civil parish
- Location within Australia Location within New South Wales
- Coordinates: 35°14′54″S 149°30′04″E
- Country: Australia
- State: New South Wales
- County: Murray County

Currandooly Parish is a civil parish of Murray County, New South Wales.

Currandooly Parish is located at 35°14′54″S 149°30′04″E, on Butmaroo Creek, just outside of Bungendore, on the southern shore of Lake George.
