= Nanima =

- Town
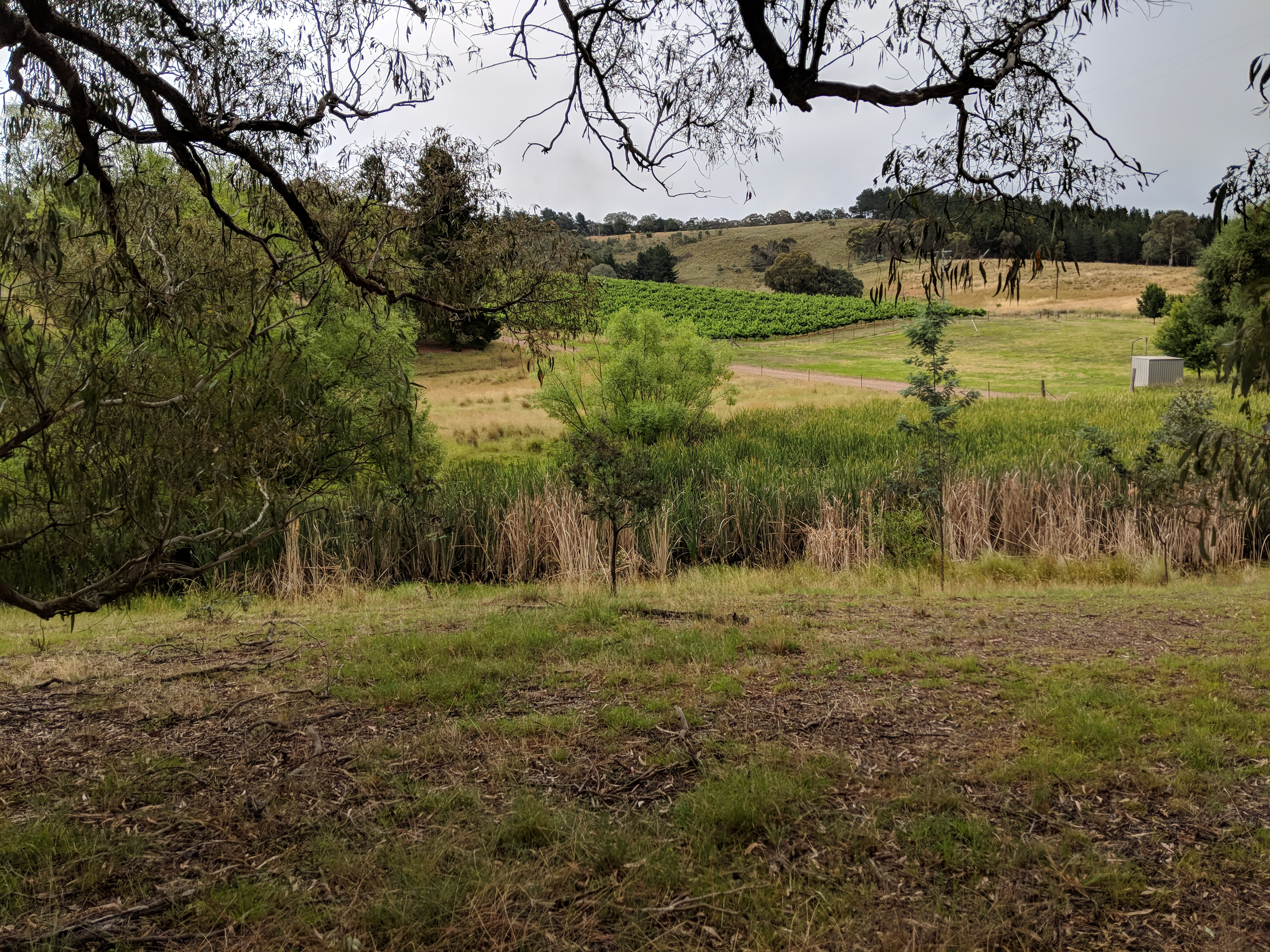

- Coordinates: 35°00′32″S 149°07′46″E
- Country: Australia
- State: New South Wales
- Region: Southern Tablelands
- LGA: Yass Valley Council
- Location: 37 km (23 mi) N of Canberra; 31 km (19 mi) SE of Yass, New South Wales

Government
  - State electorate: Goulburn
  - Federal division: Riverina

Population
  - Total: 252 (2021 census)
- Postcode: 2582
- County: Murray
- Parish: Toual, Bedulluck
Localities around Nanima
Murrumbateman	Yass River	Yass River
Murrumbateman	Nanima	Gundaroo
Springrange	Springrange	Sutton

Nanima is a locality in the Yass Valley Council area, New South Wales, Australia. It lies on both sides of the Murrumbateman Road between Murrumbateman and Gundaroo, about 37 km north of Canberra. At the 2021 census, it had a population of 252.

Nanima is also a civil parish of Murray County. It is located northwest of the current locality of Nanima in the Murrumbateman area, although there is also a Murrumbateman parish that lies further north.
