= Derringullen Creek =

Derringullen
- Location of the Derringullen Creek mouth in New South Wales

Location
- Country: Australia
- State: New South Wales
- Region: South Eastern Highlands (IBRA), South Western Slopes
- LGA: Yass Valley

Physical characteristics
- Source: Great Dividing Range
  - location: below Pig Hill
  - coordinates: 34°42′26″S 148°56′6″E
  - elevation: 716 m (2,349 ft)
- Mouth: confluence with Yass River
  - location: west of Yass
  - coordinates: 34°50′27″S 148°48′36″E
  - elevation: 395 m (1,296 ft)
- Length: 25 km (16 mi)

Basin features
- River system: Murrumbidgee catchment, Murray–Darling basin

The Derringullen Creek, a mostly–perennial river that is part of the Murrumbidgee catchment within the Murray–Darling basin, located in the South Western Slopes region of New South Wales, Australia.

== Course and features ==
The Derringullen Creek (technically a river) rises below Pig Hill, on the Great Dividing Range, and flows generally south-southwest before reaching its confluence with the Yass River west of Yass. The Derringullen Creek descends 322 metres (1,056 ft) over its 25-kilometre (16 mi) course.

The Hume Highway crosses the Derringullen Creek between Yass and Bowning.

== See also ==
- List of rivers of New South Wales (A–K)
- Rivers of New South Wales
