= Parish of Bimberi =

Coordinates: 35°34′57″S 148°36′02″E

Bimberi, New South Wales is a civil parish of Cowley County, New South Wales. It includes the source of the Murrumbidgee River at Peppercorn Hill. It is in the Kosciuszko National Park and is uninhabited.
