= Parish of Yarara =

The Parish of Yarara is a civil parish of Cowley County, New South Wales. The parish is between the Murrumbidgee River and the Australian Capital Territory border and is heavily forested. It lies to the west of Michelago, but is cut off from it by the Murrumbidgee and is only accessible by road from Tharwa or Williamsdale. It forms part of the current locality of Clear Range, which had a population of 36 as of the 2016 census.
