= Parish of Queanbeyan =

Coordinates: 35°20′54″S 149°15′04″E

Queanbeyan Parish
- Cadastral division
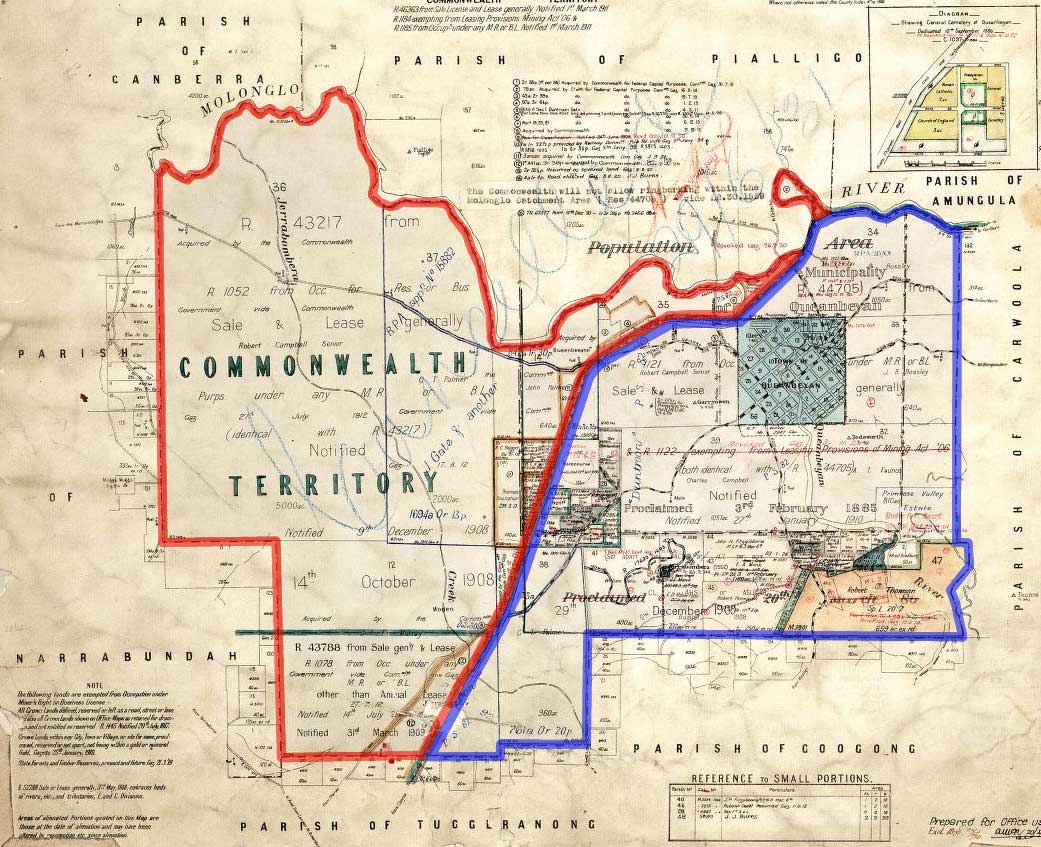
- The Parish of Queanbeyan since 1909 Formerly part of the parish; transferred to the Commonwealth for the ACT in 1909
- Country: Australia
- State: New South Wales
- LGA: Queanbeyan-Palerang Regional Council
- County: Murray
Lands administrative divisions around Queanbeyan Parish
Canberra	Pialligo	Amungula
Narrabundah	Queanbeyan Parish	Carwoola
Tuggeranong	Googong	Googong

Queanbeyan Parish is a parish of Murray County, New South Wales, a cadastral unit for use on land titles. It covers the city of Queanbeyan. It was originally bounded by the Molonglo River to the north, but is now bounded by the NSW-ACT border in the north and west. Parts of the western area of the parish were transferred to the Australian Capital Territory in 1909, including what are now the Canberra suburbs of Fyshwick, Narrabundah, Kingston, Oaks Estate, Harman and part of Hume.
