= Springrange =

- Suburb
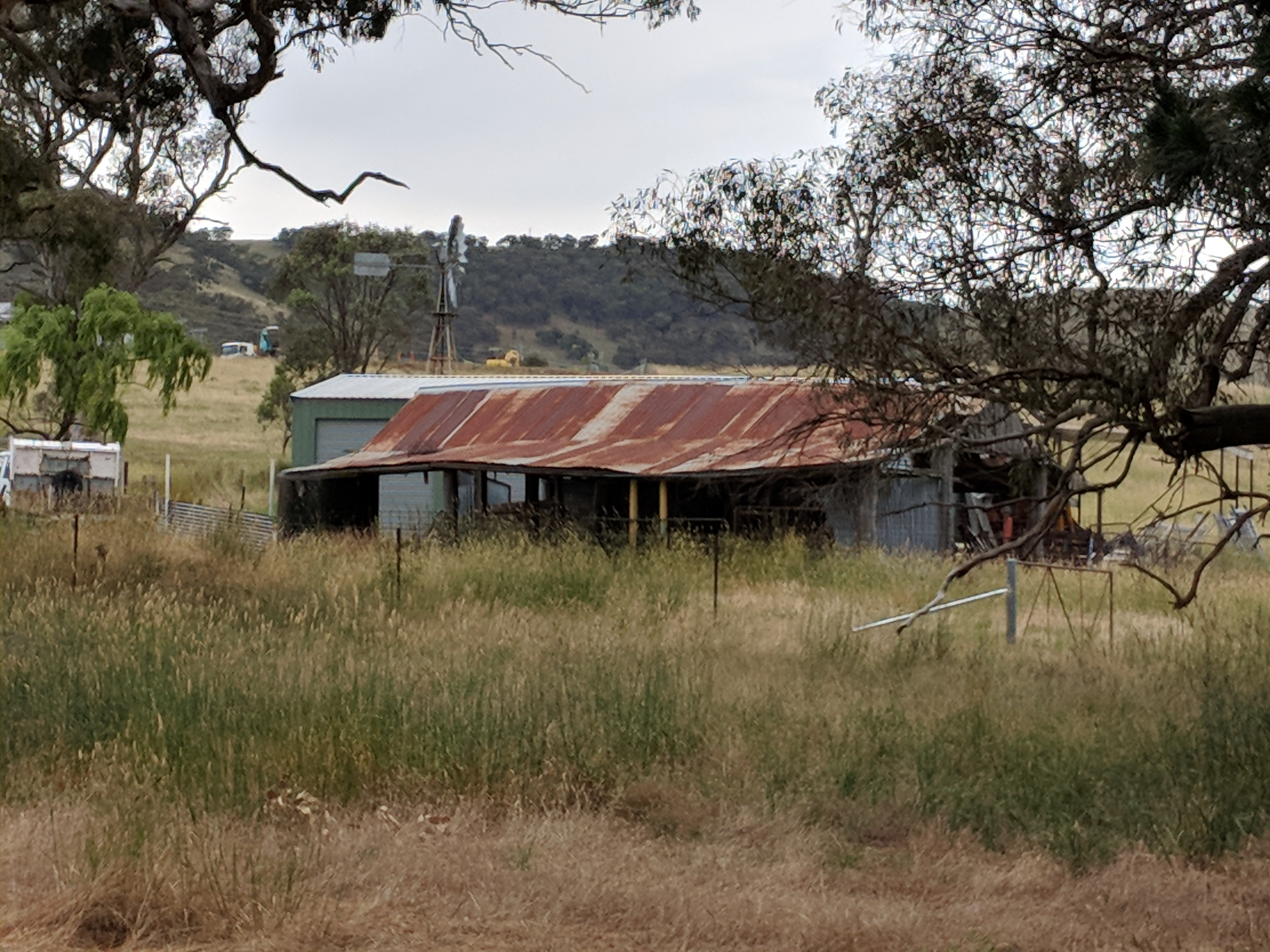

- Coordinates: 35°04′21″S 149°05′21″E
- Country: Australia
- State: New South Wales
- LGA: Yass Valley Council
- Location: 30 km (19 mi) N of Canberra; 46 km (29 mi) S of Yass; 294 km (183 mi) SW of Sydney

Government
  - State electorate: Goulburn
  - Federal division: Riverina
- Elevation: 634 m (2,080 ft)

Population
  - Total: 498 (2021 census)
- Postcode: 2618
Suburbs around Springrange
Murrumbateman	Nanima	Gundaroo
Jeir	Springrange	Sutton
Wallaroo	Wallaroo	Sutton

Springrange or Spring Range is a rural locality in Yass Valley Shire, New South Wales, immediately to the north of the Australian Capital Territory. It is approximately 30 kilometres north of the Australian city of Canberra to the east of the Barton Highway. At the 2021 census, it had a population of 498.

The highest location is Mount Spring at 889 meters above sea level. It hosts a communications tower. The main road through the locality is Spring Range Road.
