= Parish of Nattung =

Nattung, New South Wales is a civil parish of Cowley County, New South Wales. Nattung is in the Snowy Monaro Regional Council at 35°44′54″S 148°36′04″E. It lies in the headwaters of the Murrumbidgee River and in the Kosciuszko National Park. It is uninhabited.
