= Parish of Ginninderra =

Ginninderra Parish
- Cadastral division
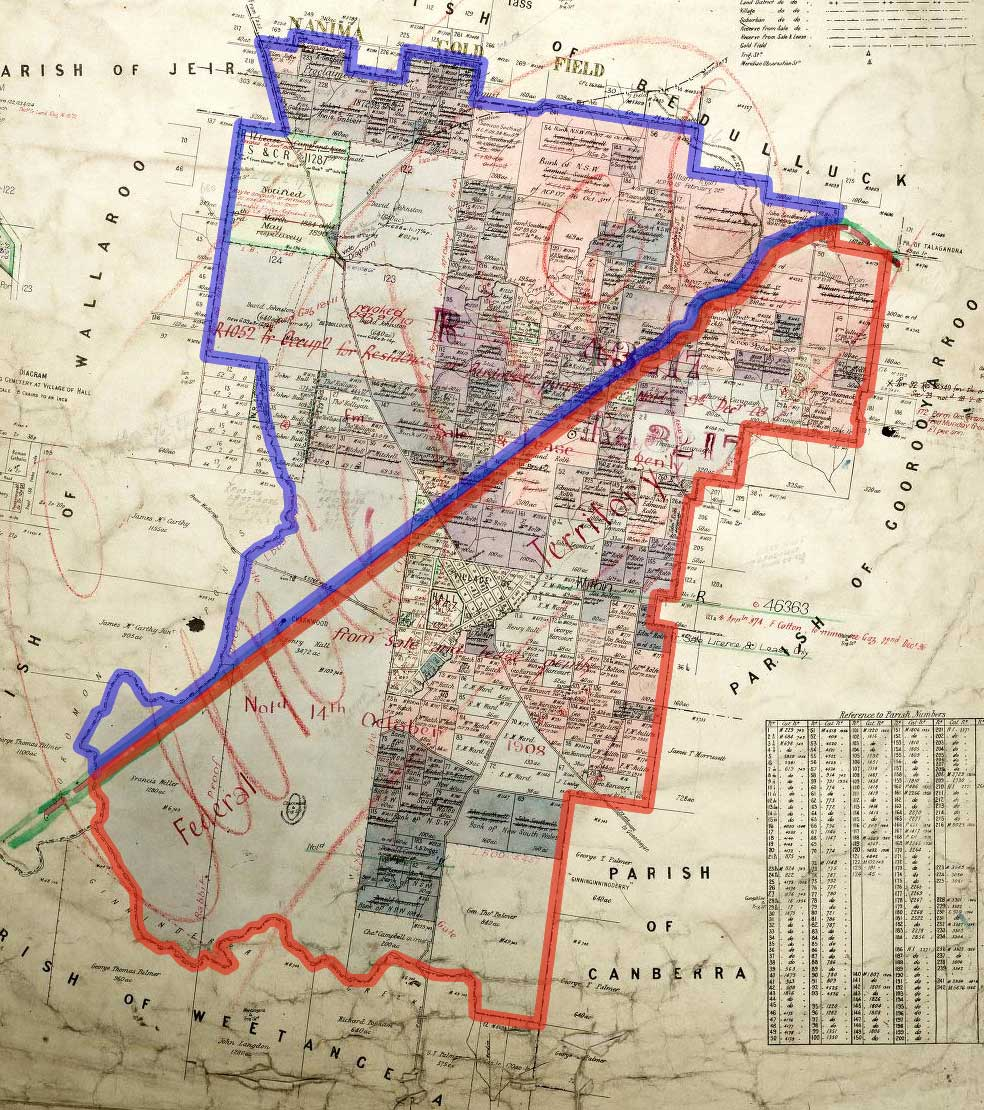
- The Parish of Ginninderra since 1909 Formerly part of the parish; transferred to the Commonwealth for the ACT in 1909
- Coordinates: 35°08′41″S 149°02′28″E
- Country: Australia
- State: New South Wales
- LGA: Yass Valley Council
- County: Murray
Lands administrative divisions around Ginninderra Parish
Wallaroo	Bedulluck	Talagandra
Wallaroo	Ginninderra Parish	Goorooyarroo
Weetangera	Weetangera	Canberra

Ginninderra Parish is one of the 54 parishes of Murray County, New South Wales, a cadastral unit for use on land titles. It is now about half the size it was in the nineteenth century, after land in the parish was transferred to the Australian Capital Territory in 1911. It once included what are now the north-western suburbs of Belconnen, as well as Hall and part of Western Gungahlin, including Harcourt Hill in the modern suburb of Nicholls.

== Former boundaries ==
Before 1911, the Ginninderra Parish included that portion of the farmlands on the Ginninderra Plain located between Ginninderra Creek to the south to what is the northern boundary of the Australian Capital Territory to the north. Gooromon Creek was the boundary in the south-west. The parish included all of the present day suburbs of Fraser, Dunlop, Spence and Charnwood; and most of Flynn, Melba and Evatt (the parts north of Ginninderra Creek).
