= Parish of Carwoola =

Carwoola Parish New South Wales
- LGA(s): Queanbeyan-Palerang Regional Council
- County: Murray
Lands administrative divisions around Carwoola Parish:
Amungula	Molonglo	Molonglo
Queanbeyan	Carwoola Parish	Molonglo
Googong	Yarrow	Yanununbeyan

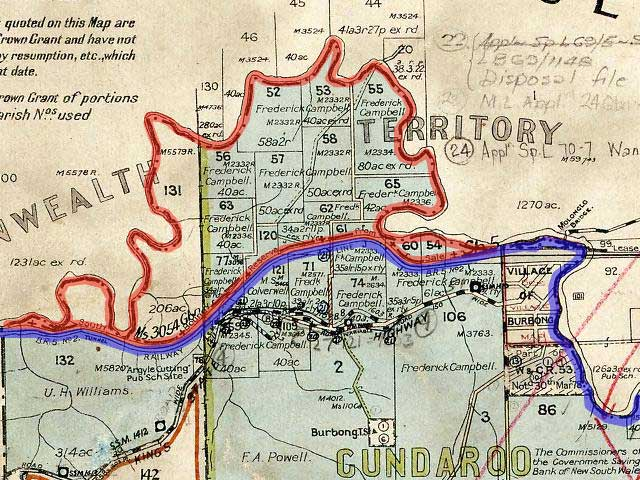
Highlighted on the map: Part of the current parish boundary Area between the Molonglo River and the Goulburn-Queanbeyan railway transferred to the Commonwealth for the ACT in 1909

Carwoola Parish is a parish of Murray County, a cadastral unit for use on land titles. It is located to the south of the Australian Capital Territory and to the south-east of Queanbeyan. The original northern and eastern boundary was the Molonglo River; this is still the boundary for most of the parish, except in the north, where the relatively small area north of the Queanbeyan-Goulburn railway line (at 35°19′42″S 149°17′45″E ) was transferred to the ACT in 1909. The south-western boundary is the Queanbeyan River. Captain's Flat Road is the major road running through the parish. The area also roughly aligns with the locality of Carwoola.
