= Parish of Werriwa =

The Parish of Werriwa is a parish of Murray County (Australia). It is located to the north of Lake George and is the local Aboriginal name for the lake.

The parish, located at 34.983333°S 149.516664°E is near the town of Bungendore and about 50km north of Canberra. The name Werriwa, was in the early 20th century the name of the wider region between of Bungendore, Goulburn and Lake George.

The Division of Werriwa, famous as the electorate of Gough Whitlam and Mark Latham was originally in this area at federation, however, demographic and boundary changes over time have seen that electorate now located in Western Sydney.

Landmarks in the area include Werriwa homestead built in about 1882.

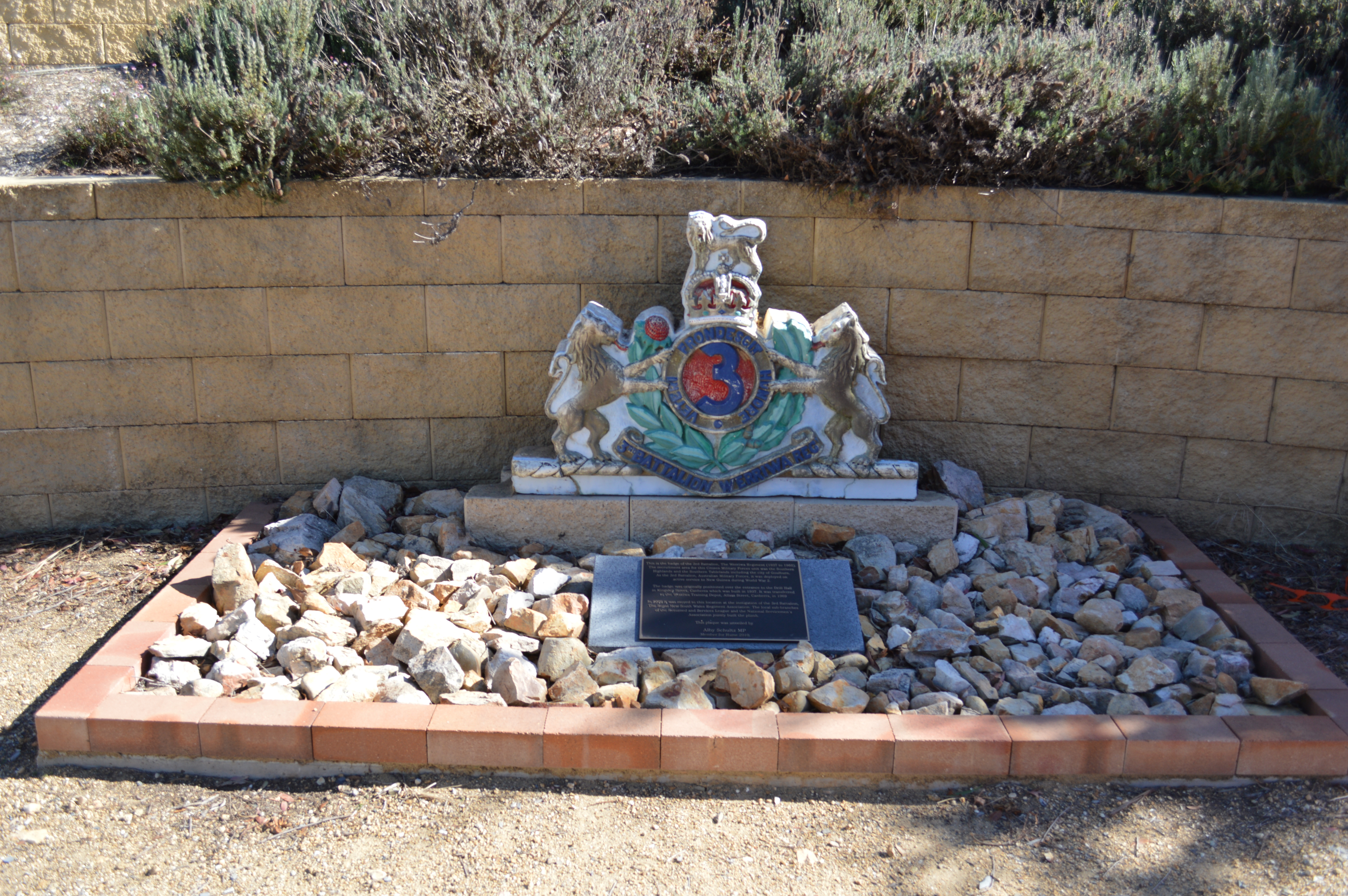
Goulburn War Memorial Museum Werriwa Regiment Badge

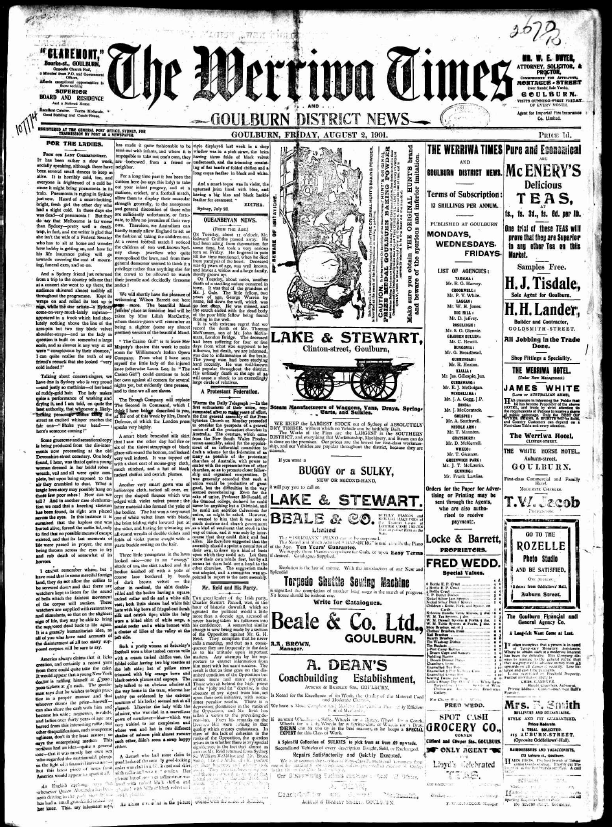
Werriwa Newspaper 1901

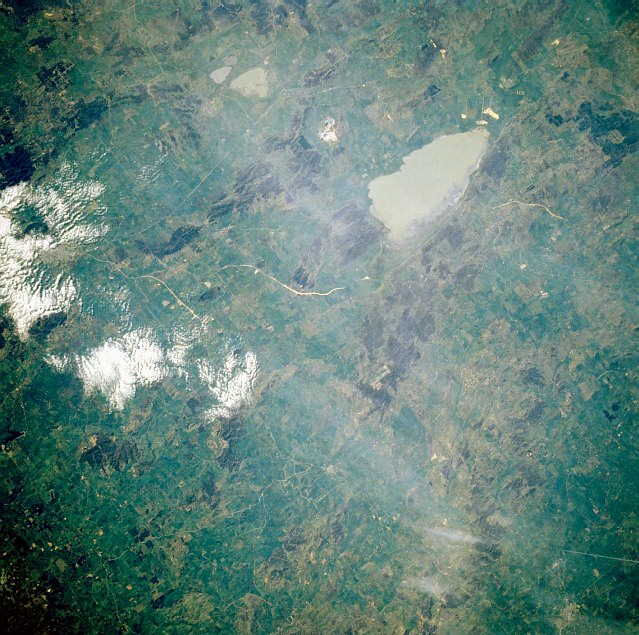
Werriwa district from space
