= Parish of Ellenden =

Ellenden Parish, is a civil parish of Murray County, New South Wales.

Ellenden Parish is located at 35°07′54″S 149°30′04″E, on the eastern shore of Lake George, and the economy is based on agriculture and renewable power generation. The nearest town is Bungendore.
