= Wamboin =

- Suburb
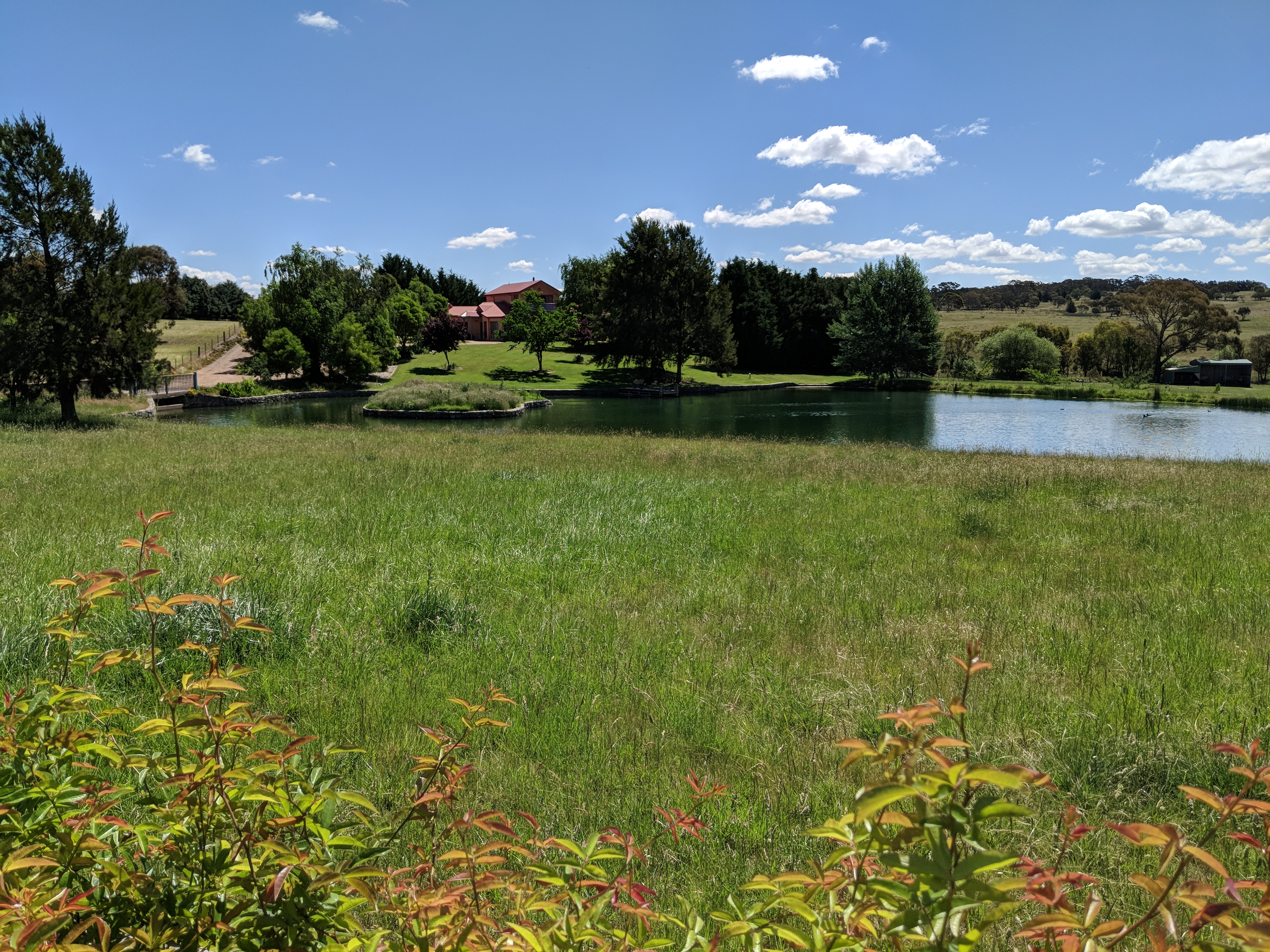
- Wamboin

- Coordinates: 35°15′30″S 149°18′25″E
- Country: Australia
- State: New South Wales
- LGA: Queanbeyan-Palerang Regional Council
- Location: 84 km (52 mi) from Goulburn; 21 km (13 mi) from Bungendore; 16 km (9.9 mi) from Canberra, ACT; 12 km (7.5 mi) from Queanbeyan

Government
  - State electorate: Monaro
  - Federal division: Eden-Monaro
- Elevation: 800 m (2,600 ft)

Population
  - Total: 1,805 (2021 census)
- Time zone: UTC+10 (AEST)
  - Summer (DST): UTC+11 (AEDT)
- Postcode: 2620
- County: Murray
- Parish: Wamboin
Suburbs around Wamboin
Sutton	Bywong	Lake George
Sutton	Wamboin	Bungendore
Majura	Kowen	Bungendore

Wamboin is a rural-residential area in the Southern Tablelands of New South Wales, Australia in the County of Murray, Queanbeyan-Palerang Regional Council LGA. It is approximately 16 kilometres north-east of the Australian city of Canberra.

It should not be confused with the Parish of Wamboyne, near West Wyalong, NSW, the rural locality of Wamboin near The Marra in central northern NSW, nor the village of Wonboyn on the far south coast of NSW.

Wamboin is about 20 minutes drive from the Canberra CBD, 25 minutes from the Woden Town Centre, and about 10 minutes drive from the city of Queanbeyan. Services in the area include a local Church (Anglican), community centre, recycling area at the community centre, waste transfer station (at Macs Reef Road, Bywong) and rural fire brigade.

Community organisations include the Wamboin Community Association, a bookgroup, golf club, Greenways Renewal Working Group (GRoW), Landcare, Playgroup, Pony Club, Wildcare and Wonderful Women of Wamboin (WWoW). Blocks of land range in size from 5 acres (20,000 m^{2}) to 50 acres (200,000 m^{2}).

The name Wamboin is probably derived from Wiradjuri wambuuwayn, meaning "large grey kangaroo", though Wamboin is some distance from Wiradjuri country, and the Ngunnawal people, whose country lies between Wamboin and Wiradjuri country had, and have, a different word for kangaroo (buru).

At the 2021 census, Wamboin had a population of 1,805. 39 people identified as being Aboriginal. 83.0% stated that they were born in Australia, and 91.6% stated that they spoke only English in the home. The median age was 46. 41.1% of those aged 15 years and above stated that their qualifications were at the bachelor's degree or higher level.

The Wamboin Community Association (WCA) provides a range of community services, and represents the community at policy forums, etc. It conducts a market at the community hall, located on Bingley Way, on the third Saturday of the month, except in winter. Additionally, a comprehensive New Residents' Guide is available online and in printed form at the monthly markets. Pack.

The Wamboin Whisper is the monthly community newsletter developed by the WCA. It is distributed by local volunteers around the region and contains local news, interest articles, and is designed to maintain a sense of togetherness in the community.

The WCA hosts the annual Wamboin Bonfire and Fireworks event, marking the conclusion of the winter season. This event not only brings the community together but also offers a platform for the Wamboin Rural Fire Brigade as well as small community groups to set up food and merchandise stalls, raising funds to support local community activities.
