= Bywong =

- Suburb
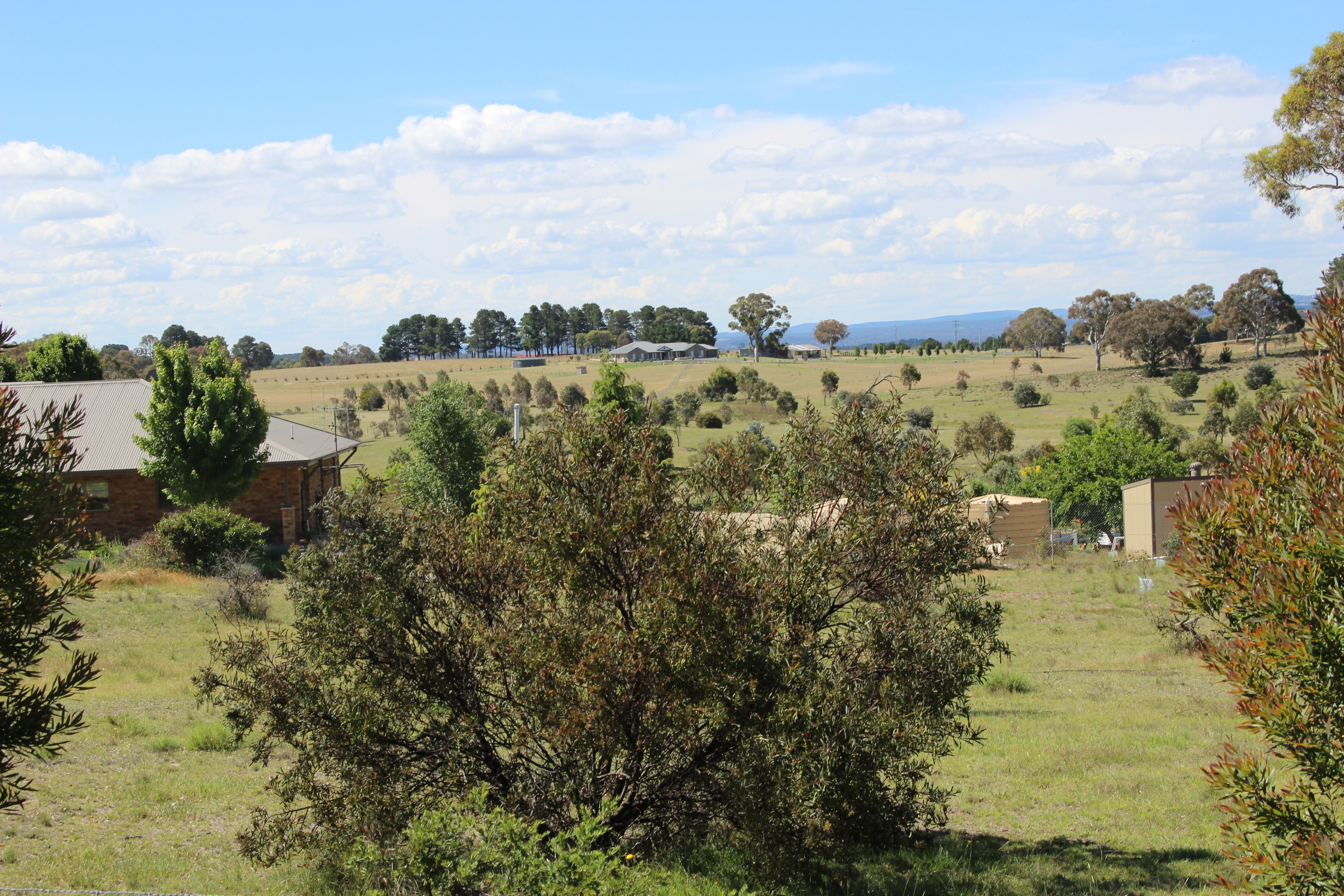

- Coordinates: 35°09′57″S 149°20′02″E
- Country: Australia
- State: New South Wales
- LGAs: Queanbeyan-Palerang Regional Council; Yass Valley Council
- Location: 24 km (15 mi) NE of Canberra

Government
  - State electorate: Monaro
  - Federal division: Eden-Monaro

Population
  - Total: 1,342 (2021 census)
- Postcode: 2621
- County: Murray
- Parish: Bywong
Suburbs around Bywong
| Gundaroo | Gundaroo | Lake George |
| Sutton | Bywong | Lake George |
| Sutton | Wamboin | Bungendore |

Bywong is a rural residential area in the Southern Tablelands of New South Wales, Australia in the Queanbeyan-Palerang Regional Council LGA. It is approximately 24 kilometres north-east of Canberra on the Federal Highway. It is also traversed by Macs Reef Road, Shingle Hill Way and Bungendore Road, the last two roads connecting Gundaroo and Bungendore. Its name is derived from an aboriginal word for "big hill". At the 2021 census, it had a population of 1,342. It had a public school from 1895 to 1906. It has a community association called Bywong Community Inc. Its local Pony Club is called Gearys Gap Pony Club, which meets at the Les Reardon Reserve, Bywong.
