= Yass River =

River in New South Wales, Australia

Yass Cohen Creek
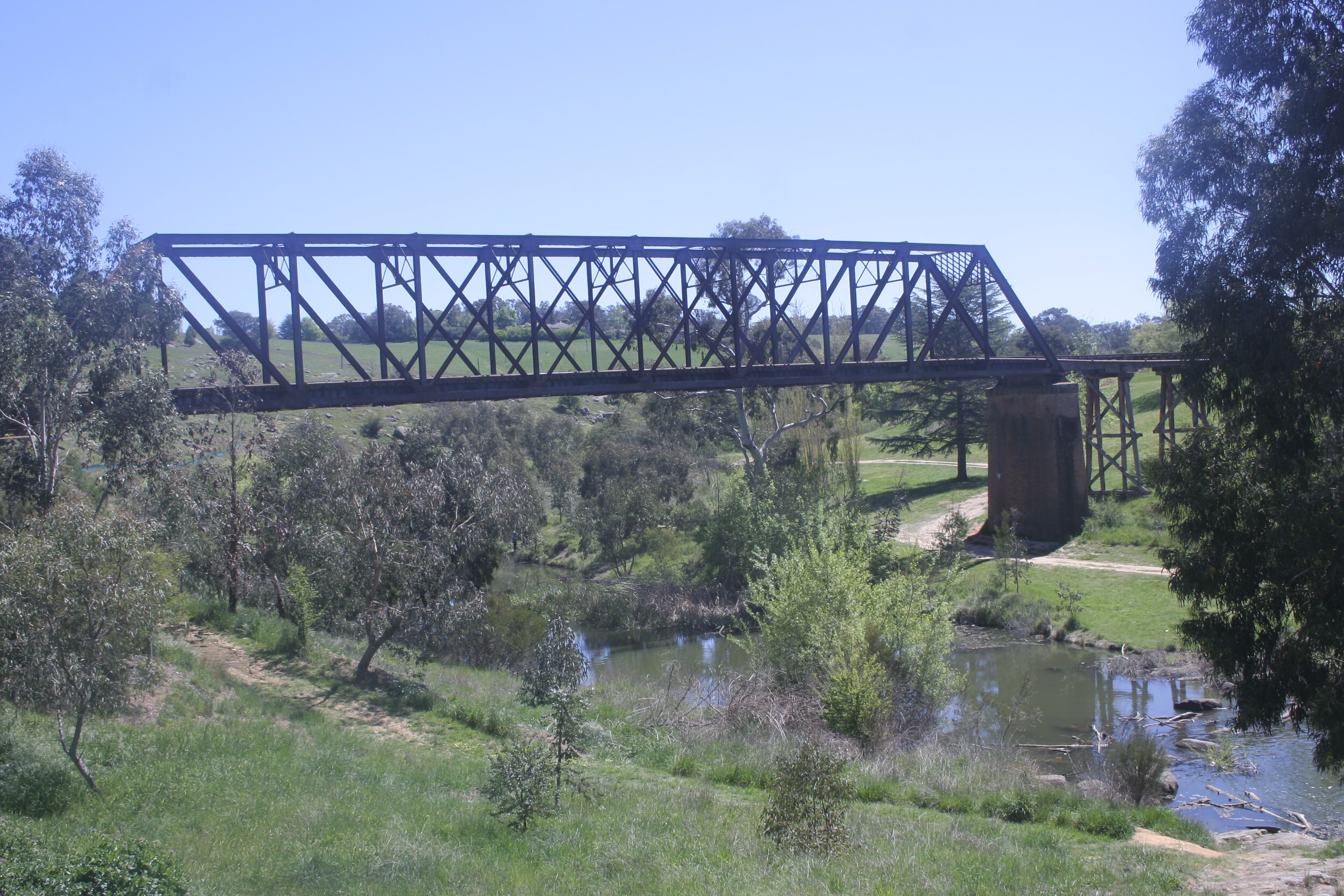
- A railway bridge over the Yass River.

- Location of the Yass River mouth in New South Wales
- Etymology: An Aborigine's comments to Hamilton Hume: "Yass boss, plains"; Comments to Hume: "Yas, yas, plenty of clear country here"; Aboriginal (Gundungura): Yarrh or Yharr, a name for the river

Location
- Country: Australia
- State: New South Wales
- Region: South Eastern Highlands (IBRA), Riverina, Southern Tablelands, South Western Slopes
- LGAs: Queanbeyan–Palerang, Yass Valley
- City: Yass

Physical characteristics
- Source: Kowan Gully, Wamboin
  - location: in Wamboin
  - elevation: 758 m (2,487 ft)
- Mouth: confluence with the Murrumbidgee River
  - location: Lake Burrinjuck
  - coordinates: 34°52′36″S 148°46′55″E
  - elevation: 345 m (1,132 ft)
- Length: 139 km (86 mi)

Basin features
- River system: Murrumbidgee catchment, Murray-Darling basin
- Tributaries
  - left: Back Creek (New South Wales), Murrumbateman Creek
  - right: Cohen Creek, Black Joes Creek, Bungendore Creek, Brooks Creek, Derringullen Creek

The Yass River, a perennial river that is part of the Murrumbidgee catchment within the Murray–Darling basin, is located in the Southern Tablelands and South Western Slopes districts of New South Wales, Australia.

== Course and features ==
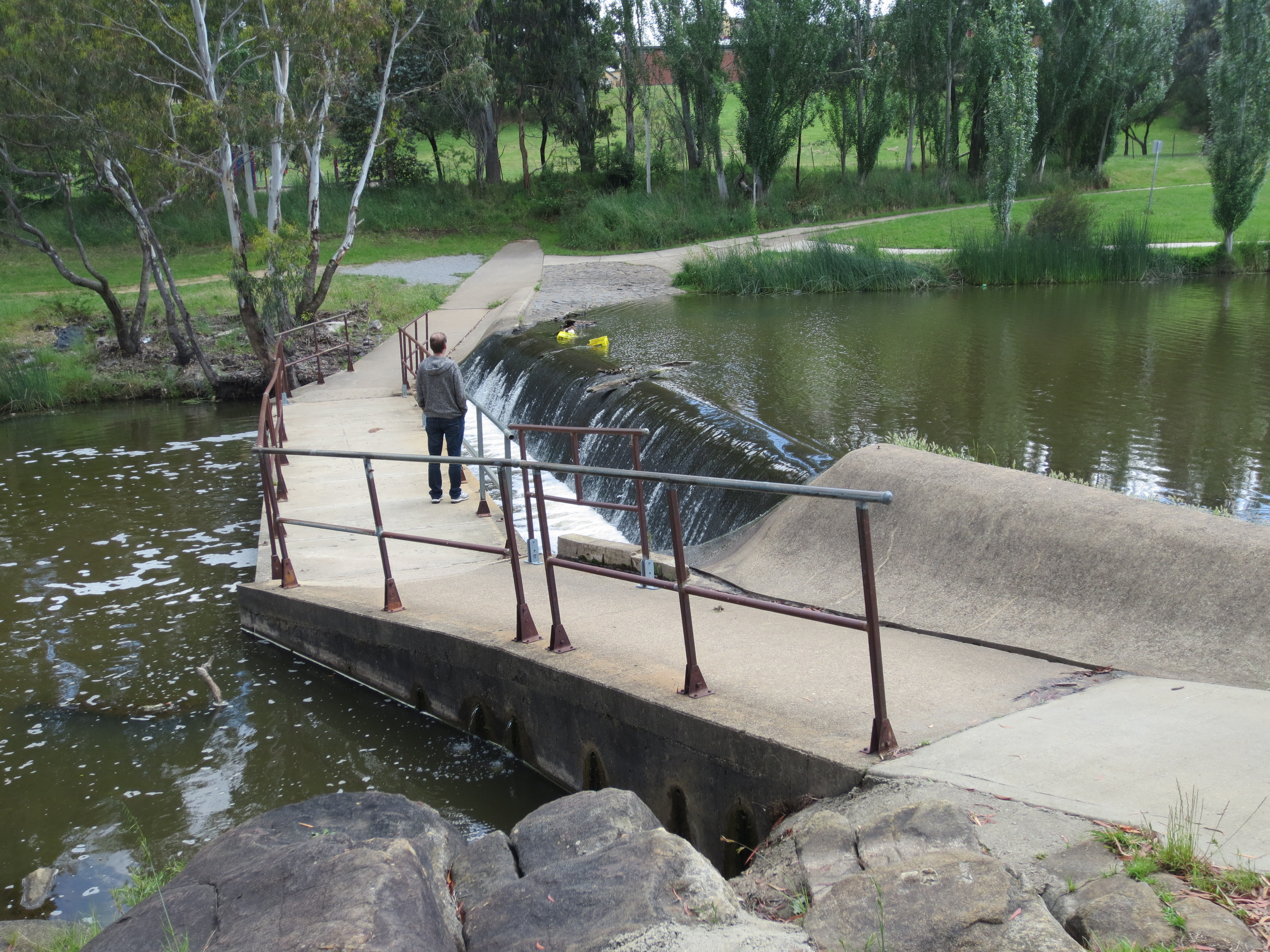
Shared Pedestrian/Cycle walk way and weir across the Yass River in Riverbank Park, Yass

The river rises in rugged country south west of Bungendore, in Wamboin and flows generally north north west then south west, joined by seven minor tributaries, towards its confluence with the Murrumbidgee River into the impounded waters of Lake Burrinjuck, west of Yass, dropping 413 metres (1,355 ft) over its 139-kilometre (86 mi) course.

== Etymology ==
A number of competing theories exist as to the origin of the name "Yass". It is believed to be named after an Aboriginal Australian commented to explorer, Hamilton Hume, that "Yass boss, plains". An alternative theory is that Yass was named after comments made by Mr Angel, a member of Hume's exploration party, that "Yas, yas, plenty of clear country here". A third theory is that the local Aboriginal Gandangara people used the words Yarrh or Yharr as the name for the river, literally translated to mean "running water".

== See also ==
- List of rivers of Australia
- List of rivers of New South Wales (L–Z)
- Rivers of New South Wales
