= Seat of Government (Administration) Act 1910 =

The Seat of Government (Administration) Act 1910 is an Australian Commonwealth Government act. The act established the Federal Capital Territory's (now Australian Capital Territory) laws based on the laws of New South Wales up until 1911. From 1911 onwards the laws of the territory would be created by the Commonwealth and Governor-General. This system remained in effect up until the Australian Capital Territory (Self-Government) Act 1988 brought self-government to the ACT.

The act was signed on 25 November 1910 by the Governor-General Lord Dudley.
