= Murray County, New South Wales =

Murray
- Cadastral division
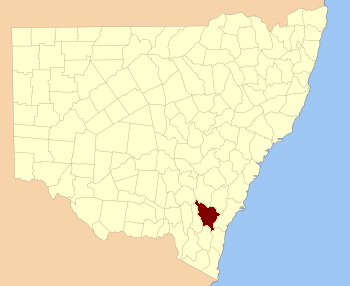
- Location in New South Wales
- Country: Australia
- State: New South Wales
Lands administrative divisions around Murray
Harden	King	Argyle
Cowley	Murray	St Vincent
Cowley	Beresford	Dampier

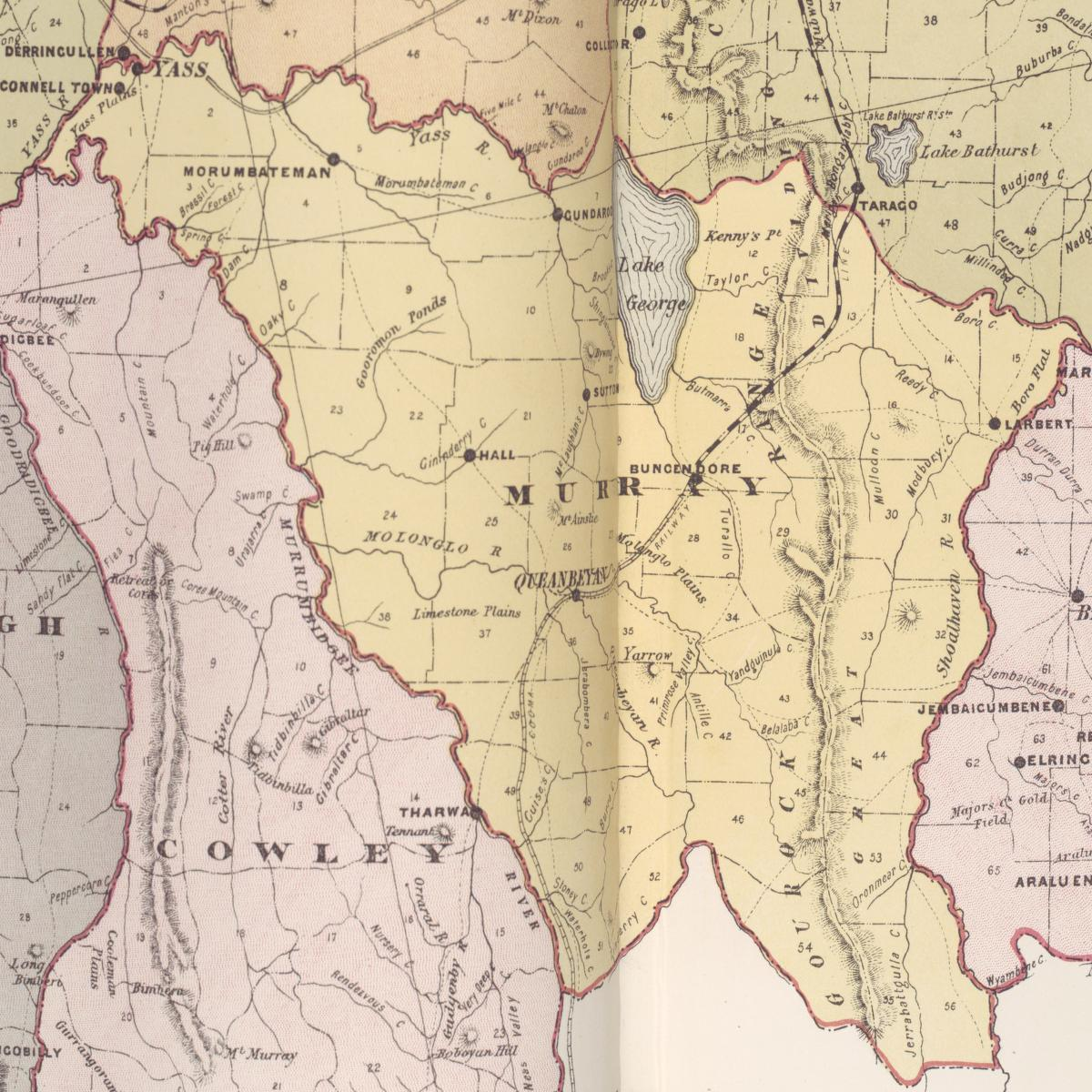
Map of Murray County in 1886

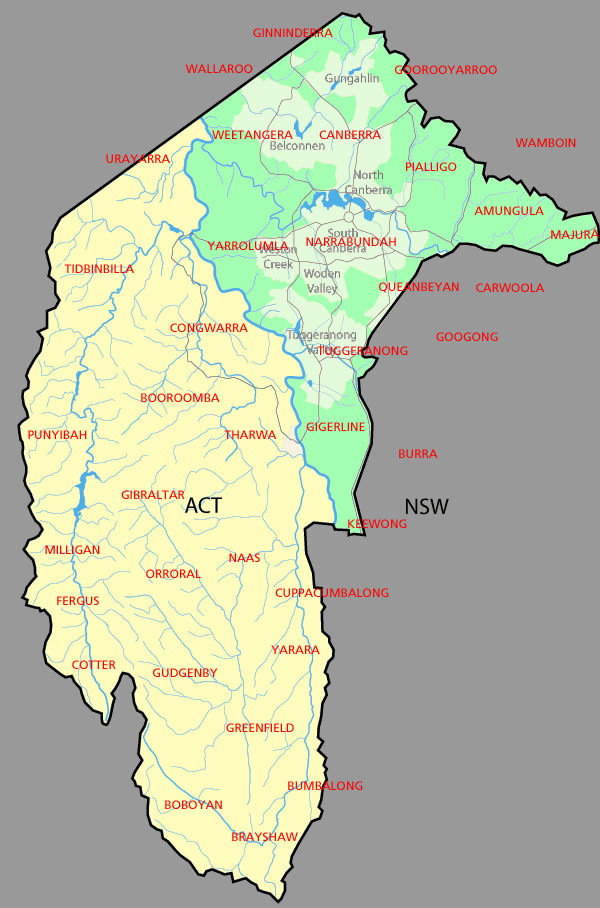
Map showing parishes (labelled in red) in the ACT area. Murray County shown in green.

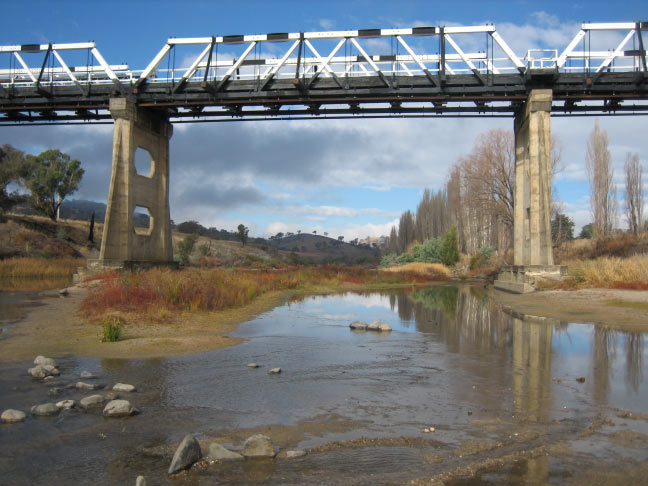
Looking south near the Tharwa Bridge; the Murrumbidgee River formed the boundary between Murray, on the left and Cowley on the right. This land is now part of the Australian Capital Territory and not in any county.

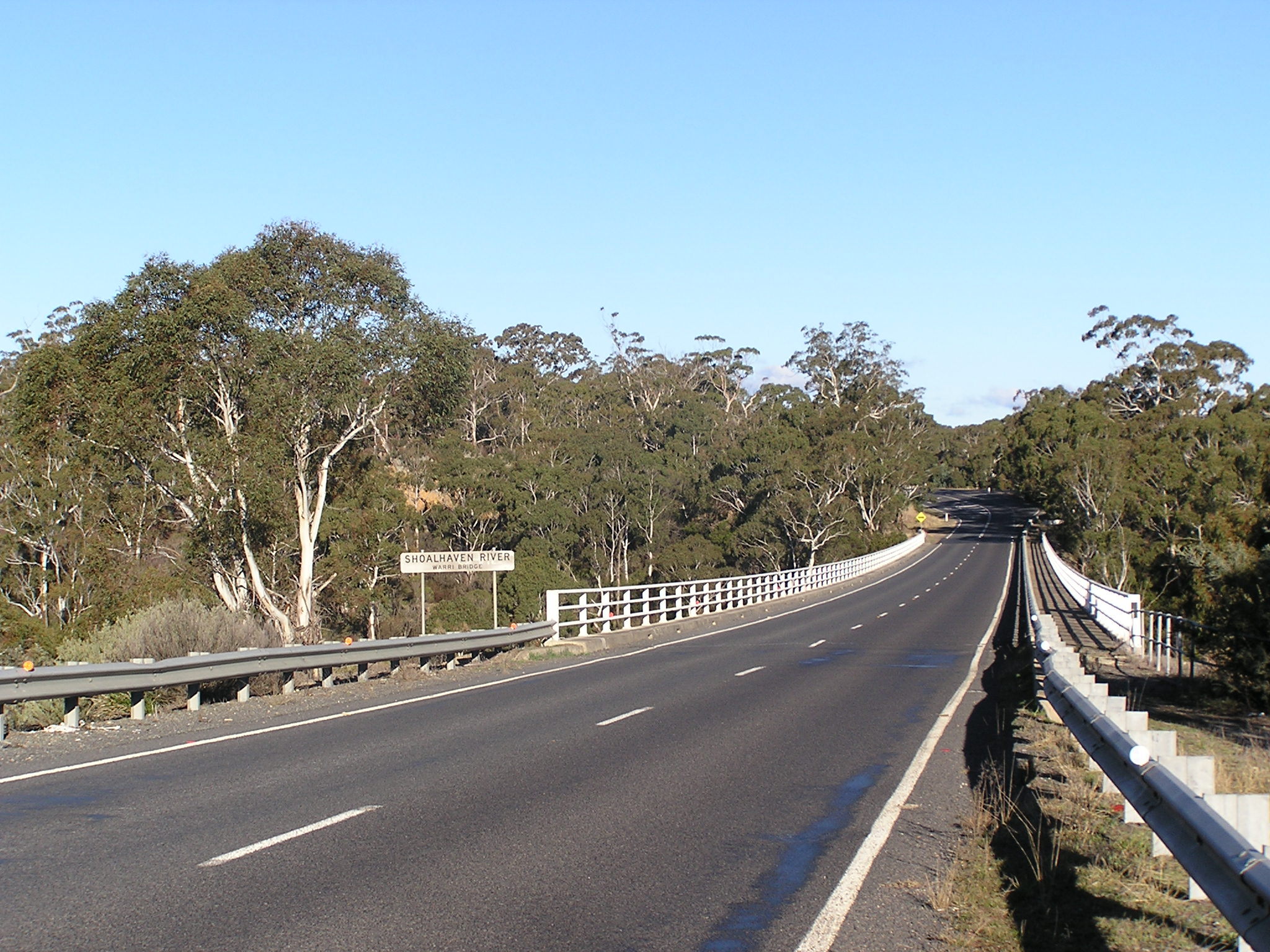
Bridge over the Shoalhaven River, near Braidwood; the river is the boundary between Murray and St Vincent.

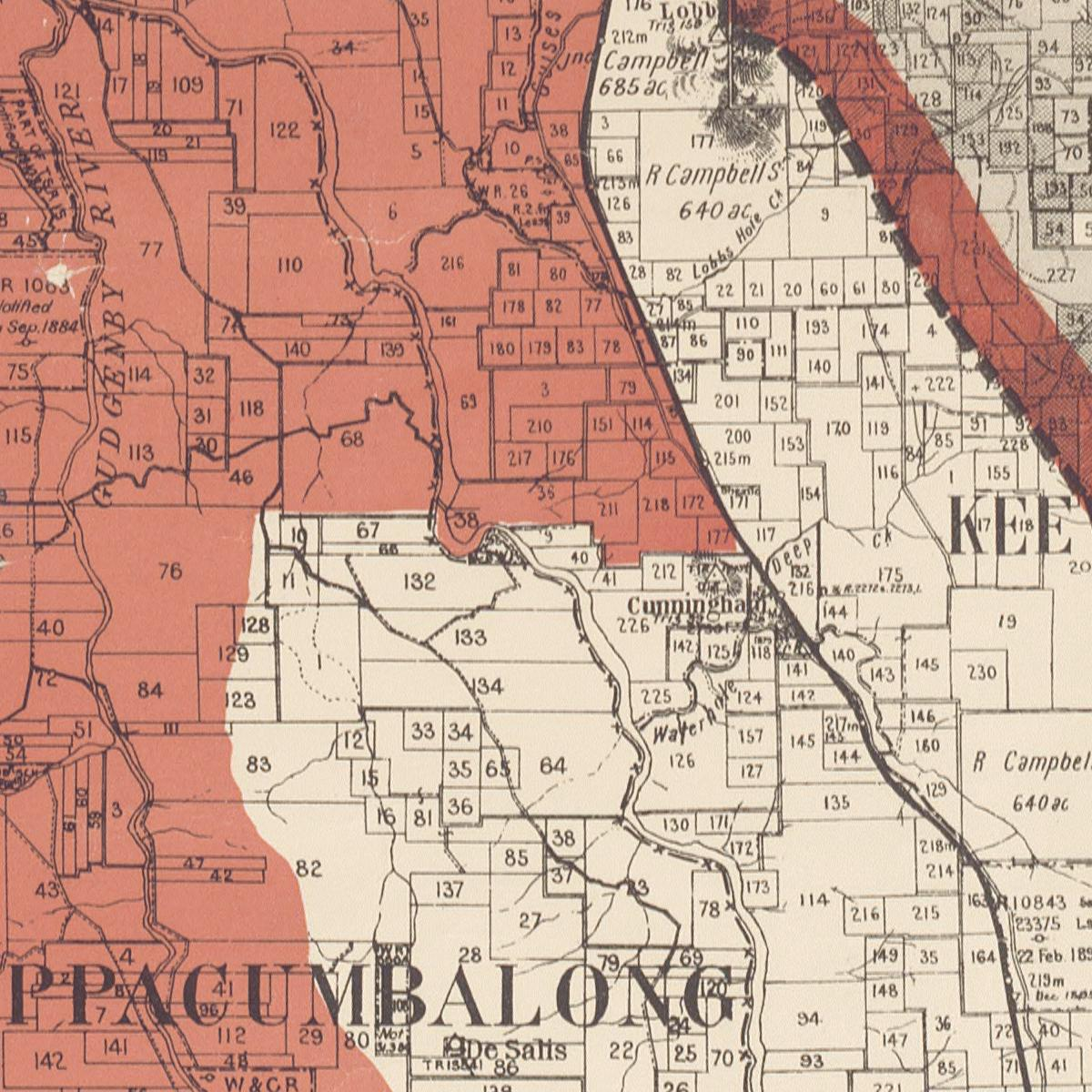
1909 cadastral map showing the small part of the ACT-NSW border near 35°35′14″S 149°7′0″E determined by property boundaries in the parishes of Keewong, County of Murray and Cuppacumbalong, County of Cowley

Murray County was one of the original Nineteen Counties in New South Wales and is now one of the 141 Lands administrative divisions of New South Wales. It included the area which is now part of Canberra and as far north as Lake George and Yass. It was originally bounded on the west by the Murrumbidgee River, on the east by the Shoalhaven River and on the north by the Yass River. A large area of the county was transferred to the Commonwealth government in the Seat of Government Acceptance Act 1909 to make part of the Australian Capital Territory, along with land in Cowley County. Since then, the ACT border is now part of the western boundary. Part of the ACT border is determined by property boundaries in the Parish of Keewong, in the County of Murray; specifically the southern end of portions 177, 218, 211, 36, and 38. This is mentioned in the Seat of Government Acceptance Act 1909.

Murray County is named in honour of Lieutenant-Governor, Sir George Murray (1772–1846). The electoral district of United Counties of Murray and St Vincent was the first electoral district for the area, between 1856 and 1859.

== Parishes within this county ==
The four parishes of Canberra, Yarrolumla, Narrabundah and Gigerline became part of the Australian Capital Territory in 1911. Some of the other parishes are smaller than they were in the nineteenth century, due to land being taken out of them for the ACT; this includes Tuggeranong, Queanbeyan, Amungula, Pialligo, Goorooyarroo, Ginninderra and Weetangera.

Alterations to parishes on the ACT/NSW border, listed clockwise from the north-west:

- Nearly all of the Parish of Weetangera becomes part of the ACT except for the small section near Ginninderra falls at 35°12′22″S 148°57′35″E
- A small portion of the Parish of Wallaroo becomes part of the ACT at 35°11′54″S 149°00′00″E (located to the north-west of Ginninderra Creek)
- About half of the Parish of Ginninderra joins the ACT (including Hall)
- A minuscule portion of the Parish of Bedulluck joins the ACT, near the northern tip of the territory.
- Two non-continuous parts of the Parish of Goorooyarroo join the ACT, which make up about two fifths of the parish area in total. (Northern Gungahlin area)
- Nearly all of the Parish of Pialligo becomes part of the ACT (includes the current airport and land to the east of Mount Majura), except for a small point at 35°13′22″S 149°12′29″E (located between the two parts of Goorooyarroo that became part of the territory.
- Most of the Parish of Amungula joins the ACT, leaving two non-contiguous segments on either side of the "arm" of the territory in the north-east; the northern section around 35°15′50″S 149°17′29″E; the southern around 35°20′48″S 149°19′49″E
- About a quarter of the Parish of Majura becomes part of the ACT, this leaves a tiny area separate from the main part of the parish, at 35°21′03″S 149°22′00″E
- A small section of the Parish of Carwoola becomes part of the ACT, this is located between the Molonglo River and the Goulburn-Queanbeyan railway line at 35°19′42″S 149°17′45″E
- About half of the Parish of Queanbeyan joins the ACT (modern Fyshwick Hume)
- A small portion of the Parish of Keewong which is to the east of the Murrumbidgee River at 35°34′40″S 149°07′28″E joins the ACT.

== Parish list ==
A full list of parishes found within this county (including the four former parishes of Canberra, Yarrolumla, Narrabundah and Gigerline which are now wholly in the ACT); their current LGA and mapping coordinates to the approximate centre of each location is as follows:

Parish	LGA	Coordinates
Amungula	Queanbeyan-Palerang Regional Council	35°16′54″S 149°18′04″E
Ballallaba	Queanbeyan-Palerang Regional Council	35°33′54″S 149°28′04″E
Barnet	Queanbeyan-Palerang Regional Council	35°13′54″S 149°42′04″E
Bedulluck	Yass Valley Council	35°03′54″S 149°05′04″E
Boambolo	Yass Valley Council	34°59′54″S 148°54′04″E
Bullongong	Queanbeyan-Palerang Regional Council	35°34′54″S 149°24′04″E
Burra	Queanbeyan-Palerang Regional Council	35°31′54″S 149°13′04″E
Butmaroo	Queanbeyan-Palerang Regional Council	35°22′54″S 149°30′04″E
Bywong	Queanbeyan-Palerang Regional Council	35°09′54″S 149°20′04″E
Canberra (former)	Australian Capital Territory	35°14′20″S 149°5′49″E
Carwoola	Queanbeyan-Palerang Regional Council	35°22′54″S 149°18′04″E
Currandooly	Queanbeyan-Palerang Regional Council	35°14′54″S 149°30′04″E
Ellenden	Queanbeyan-Palerang Regional Council	35°07′54″S 149°30′04″E
Fairy Meadow	Queanbeyan-Palerang Regional Council	35°14′54″S 149°37′04″E
Gigerline (former)	Australian Capital Territory	35°29′00″S 149°06′00″E
Ginninderra	Yass Valley Council	35°09′54″S 149°04′04″E
Googong	Queanbeyan-Palerang Regional Council	35°25′54″S 149°14′04″E
Goorooyarroo	Queanbeyan-Palerang Regional Council	35°10′54″S 149°14′04″E
Gundaroo	Yass Valley Council	35°01′54″S 149°20′04″E
Hume	Yass Valley Council	34°53′54″S 148°55′04″E
Jeir	Yass Valley Council	35°02′54″S 148°59′04″E
Jinero	Queanbeyan-Palerang Regional Council	35°31′54″S 149°36′04″E
Jinglemoney	Queanbeyan-Palerang Regional Council	35°25′54″S 149°39′04″E
Jinjera	Queanbeyan-Palerang Regional Council	35°41′54″S 149°29′04″E
Keewong	Queanbeyan-Palerang Regional Council	35°35′54″S 149°12′04″E
Krawarree	Queanbeyan-Palerang Regional Council	35°41′54″S 149°37′04″E
Lake George	Queanbeyan-Palerang Regional Council	35°05′54″S 149°25′04″E
Larbert	Queanbeyan-Palerang Regional Council	35°14′54″S 149°47′04″E
Majura	Queanbeyan-Palerang Regional Council	35°18′54″S 149°25′04″E
Merigan	Goulburn Mulwaree Council	35°07′54″S 149°37′04″E
Molonglo	Queanbeyan-Palerang Regional Council	35°24′54″S 149°29′04″E
Monkellan	Snowy Monaro Regional Council	35°39′54″S 149°12′04″E
Mulloon	Queanbeyan-Palerang Regional Council	35°19′54″S 149°36′04″E
Murrumbateman	Yass Valley Council	34°53′54″S 149°01′04″E
Nanima	Yass Valley Council	34°57′54″S 149°02′04″E
Narrabundah (former)	Australian Capital Territory	35°19′51″S 149°05′46″E
Ollalulla	Queanbeyan-Palerang Regional Council	35°38′54″S 149°33′04″E
Oronmear	Queanbeyan-Palerang Regional Council	35°46′54″S 149°33′04″E
Palerang	Queanbeyan-Palerang Regional Council	35°25′54″S 149°34′04″E
Pialligo	Queanbeyan-Palerang Regional Council	35°13′22″S 149°12′29″E
Purrorumba	Yass Valley Council	35°04′54″S 149°20′04″E
Queanbeyan	Queanbeyan-Palerang Regional Council	35°20′54″S 149°15′04″E
Talagandra	Yass Valley Council	35°04′54″S 149°12′04″E
Tantangera	Snowy Monaro Regional Council	35°38′54″S 149°17′04″E
Thurralilly	Queanbeyan-Palerang Regional Council	35°28′54″S 149°31′04″E
Toual	Yass Valley Council	34°59′54″S 149°11′04″E
Tuggeranong	Queanbeyan-Palerang Regional Council	35°25′54″S 149°10′04″E
Urialla	Queanbeyan-Palerang Regional Council	35°33′54″S 149°18′04″E
Wallaroo	Yass Valley Council	35°08′54″S 148°58′04″E
Wamboin	Queanbeyan-Palerang Regional Council	35°14′59″S 149°22′04″E
Warri	Queanbeyan-Palerang Regional Council	35°21′54″S 149°40′04″E
Warroo	Yass Valley Council	34°52′54″S 148°49′04″E
Weetangera	Yass Valley Council	35°12′54″S 148°59′04″E
Werriwa	Queanbeyan-Palerang Regional Council	35°04′54″S 149°31′04″E
Yanununbeyan	Queanbeyan-Palerang Regional Council	35°29′54″S 149°24′04″E
Yarrolumla (former)	Australian Capital Territory	35°19′00″S 148°59′13″E
Yarrow	Queanbeyan-Palerang Regional Council	35°27′54″S 149°19′04″E
Yass	Yass Valley Council	34°50′14″S 148°53′44″E
