= Cowley County, New South Wales =

Cowley
- Cadastral division
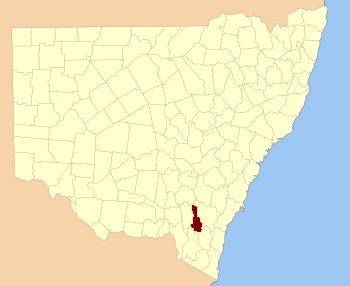
- Location in New South Wales
- Country: Australia
- State: New South Wales
Lands administrative divisions around Cowley
Harden	Harden	Murray
Buccleuch	Cowley	Murray
Wallace	Wallace	Beresford

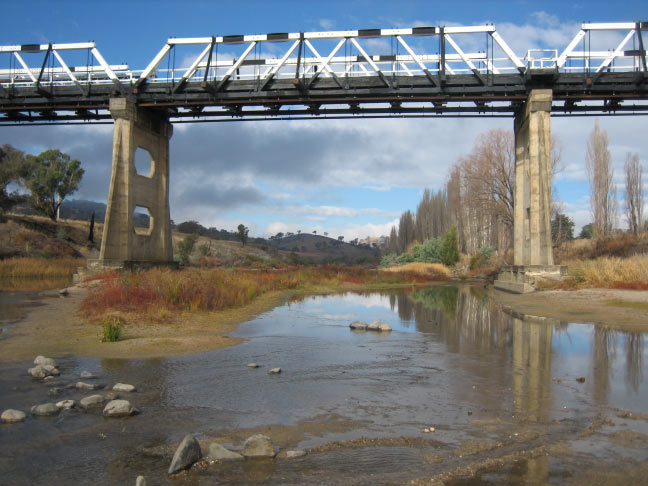
Looking south near the Tharwa Bridge; the Murrumbidgee River formed the boundary between Murray, on the left and Cowley on the right. This land is now part of the Australian Capital Territory and not in any county.

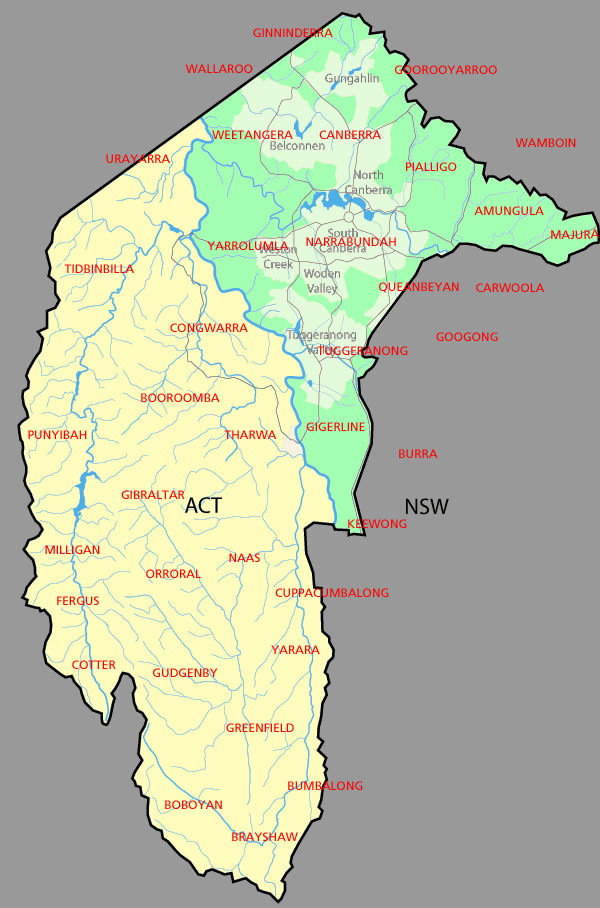
Map showing parishes in the ACT area. Cowley County shown in yellow.

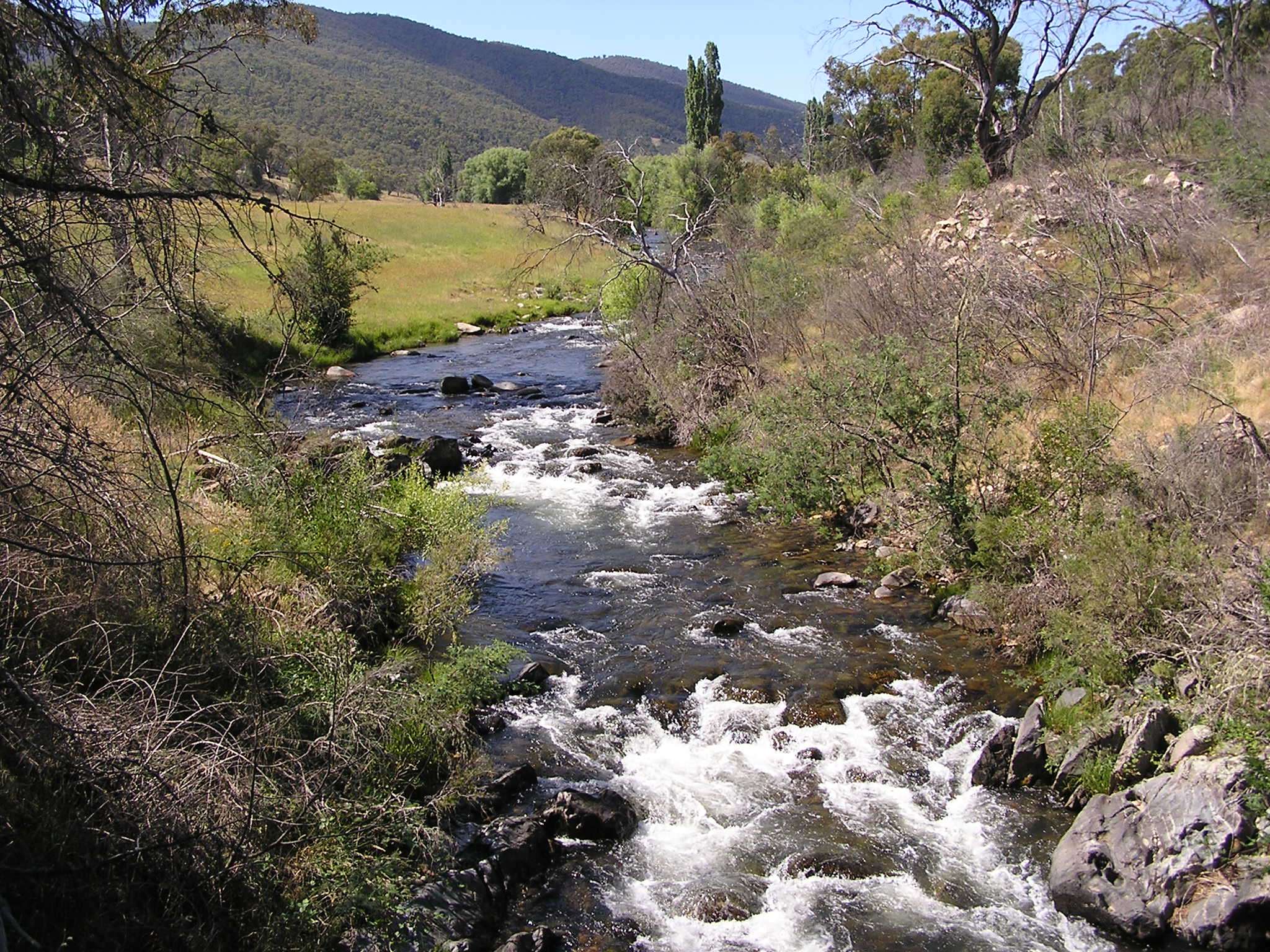
The Goodradigbee River in the Brindabella Ranges; the river was the western boundary between Cowley (left) and Buccleuch (right)

Cowley County is one of the 141 cadastral divisions of New South Wales. It contains the locality of Cavan. It was originally bordered on the north, east and part of the south by the Murrumbidgee River, and on the west by the Goodradigbee River. A large part of the county was transferred to the Commonwealth to make the Australian Capital Territory in 1909, with the remaining part the area to the north-west of the ACT as far north as the Burrinjuck Dam, and thin strips of land along the western, southern and south-eastern borders of the ACT.

Cowley County is named in honour of Henry Richard Charles Wellesley, First Earl Cowley (1804–1884).

== Parishes within this county ==
A full list of parishes found within this county including the 15 former parishes which are now part of the ACT; their current LGA and mapping coordinates to the approximate centre of each location is as follows:

Parish	LGA	Coordinates
Bimberi	Snowy Valleys Council	35°34′54″S 148°45′04″E
Boboyan (former)	Australian Capital Territory	
Booroomba (former)	Australian Capital Territory	
Brayshaw (former)	Australian Capital Territory	
Brindibella	Snowy Valleys Council	35°23′54″S 148°46′04″E
Bumbalong	Snowy Monaro Regional Council	35°48′54″S 149°07′04″E
Cavan	Yass Valley Council	35°03′54″S 148°52′04″E
Cochran	Snowy Monaro Regional Council	35°44′54″S 148°53′04″E
Congwarra (former)	Australian Capital Territory	
Cooleman	Snowy Valleys Council	35°39′54″S 148°45′04″E
Coree	Yass Valley Council	35°16′54″S 148°46′04″E
Cotter (former)	Australian Capital Territory	
Cuppacumbalong	Snowy Monaro Regional Council	35°36′54″S 149°06′04″E
East Goodradigbee	Yass Valley Council	35°07′54″S 148°44′04″E
Fergus (former)	Australian Capital Territory	
Gibraltar (former)	Australian Capital Territory	
Greenfield (former)	Australian Capital Territory	
Gudgenby (former)	Australian Capital Territory	
Gurrangora	Snowy Monaro Regional Council	35°44′54″S 148°45′04″E
Long Plain	Snowy Monaro Regional Council	35°39′54″S 148°37′04″E
Micalong	Yass Valley Council	35°13′54″S 148°45′04″E
Milligan (former)	Australian Capital Territory	
Mullion	Yass Valley Council	35°07′54″S 148°48′04″E
Murray	Snowy Valleys Council	35°36′54″S 148°40′04″E
Naas (former)	Australian Capital Territory	
Narrangullen	Yass Valley Council	34°59′54″S 148°43′04″E
Nattung	Snowy Monaro Regional Council	35°44′54″S 148°36′04″E
Orroral (former)	Australian Capital Territory	
Pabral	Yass Valley Council	35°13′54″S 148°48′04″E
Punyibah (former)	Australian Capital Territory	
Taemas	Yass Valley Council	35°01′54″S 148°46′04″E
Tharwa (former)	Australian Capital Territory	
Tidbinbilla (former)	Australian Capital Territory	
Umburra	Yass Valley Council	35°08′54″S 148°53′04″E
Urayarra	Yass Valley Council	35°14′54″S 148°53′04″E
Venterman	Snowy Valleys Council	35°29′54″S 148°45′04″E
Yaouk	Snowy Monaro Regional Council	35°44′54″S 148°48′04″E
Yarara	Snowy Monaro Regional Council	35°44′54″S 149°06′04″E
