= Yarrowlumla Shire =

Former local government area in New South Wales, Australia

- Local government area
- Country: Australia
- State: New South Wales
- Abolished: February 2004
- Council seat: Queanbeyan

Area
  - Total: 2,971 km^{2} (1,147 sq mi)

Population
  - Total: 9,654 (1999)
  - Density: 3.2494/km^{2} (8.4159/sq mi)

Yarrowlumla Shire was a local government area in New South Wales, which surrounded the Australian Capital Territory until February 2004, when it was divided between Palerang Council, Yass Valley Council, Queanbeyan City Council, Tumut Shire and a small part going to the Cooma-Monaro Shire. It had a population of 9,654 and an area of 2,971 square kilometres (1,147 sq mi) in 1999. The council was based in the municipality of Queanbeyan, outside its own territory as was common for rural shires at the time. Most of the area which became the ACT was in Yarrowlumla Shire before it was transferred to the Commonwealth in 1909. This included Yarralumla homestead, which it was named after, although using an alternative spelling.
