= Anembo =

- Town
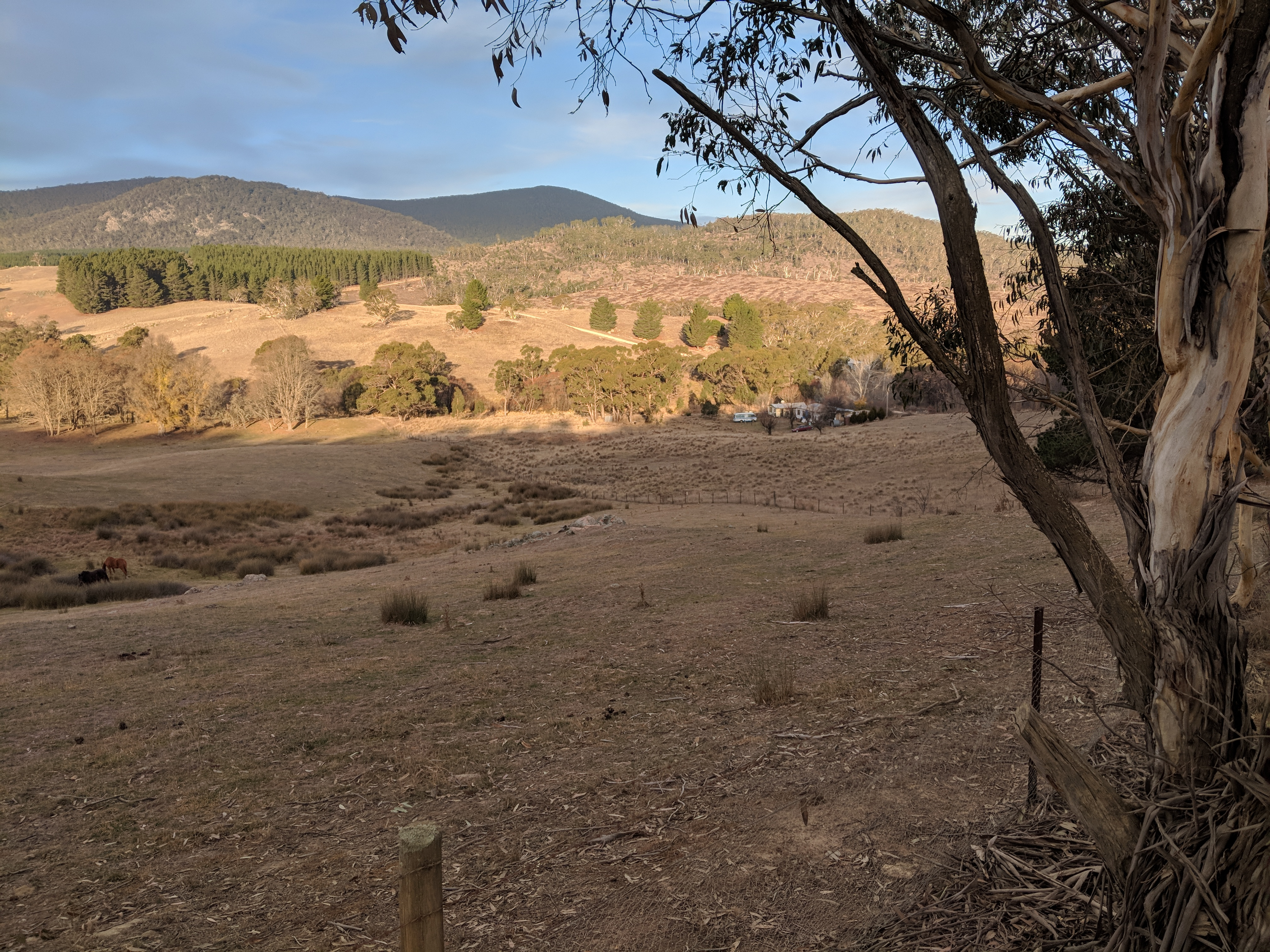

- Coordinates: 35°48′57″S 149°25′02″E
- Country: Australia
- State: New South Wales
- Region: Monaro
- LGA: Snowy Monaro Regional Council
- Location: 78 km (48 mi) SE of Canberra

Government
  - State electorate: Monaro
  - Federal division: Eden-Monaro

Population
  - Total: 72 (2021 census)
- Postcode: 2621
- County: Beresford
- Parish: Milford
Localities around Anembo
Tinderry	Jingera	Jerrabattgulla
Tinderry	Anembo	Hereford Hall
Jerangle	Jerangle	Jinden

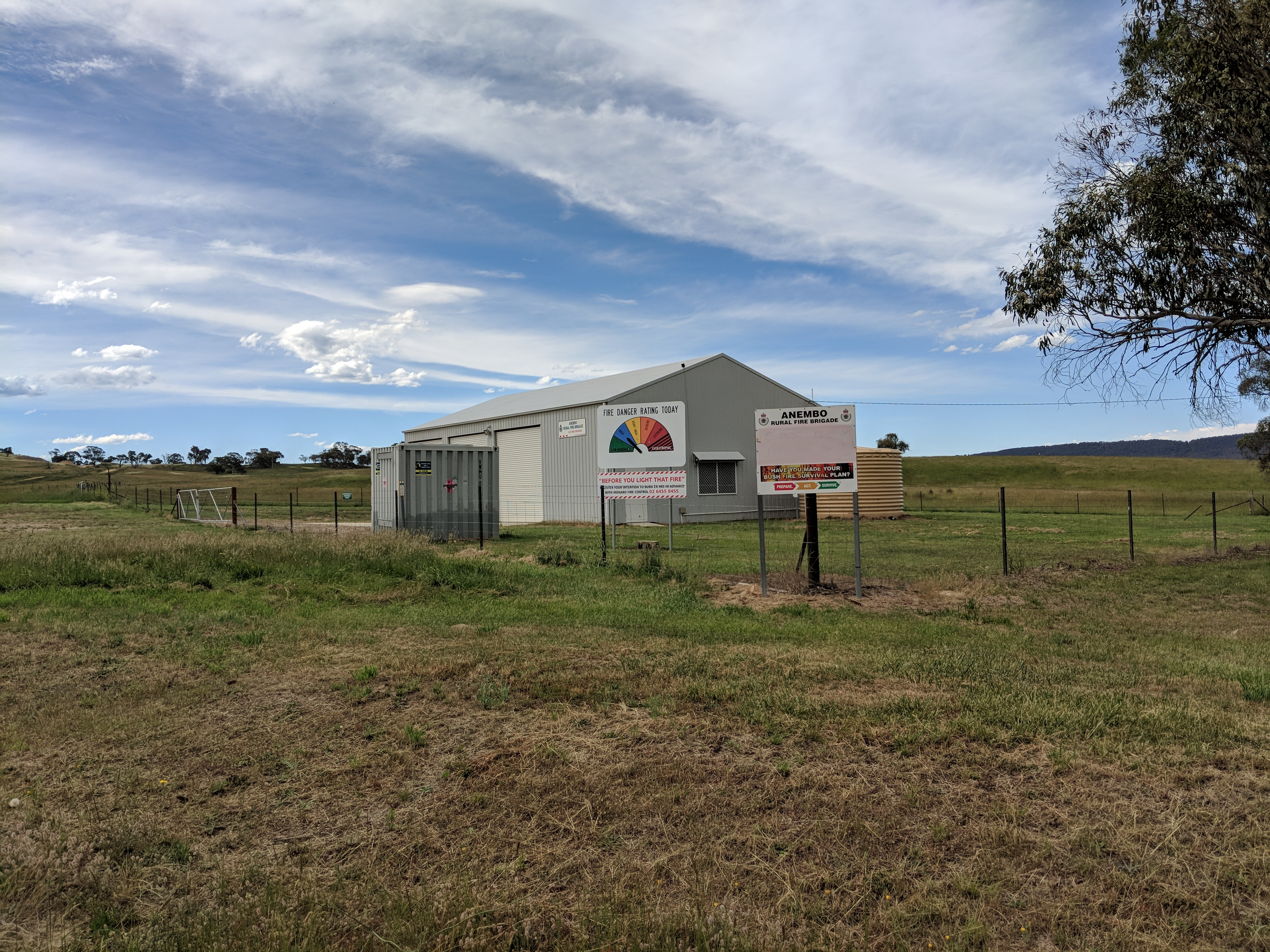
Anembo fire station

Anembo is a rural locality within the Snowy Monaro Region council area n New South Wales, Australia. It lies to the south of Captains Flat and northeast of Bredbo, situated in the broader Monaro region characterised by high elevation and rolling plains. The locality is located at approximately 35°50'10" S latitude and 149°25'57" E longitude, with an elevation around 1,010 metres.

At the 2021 census, it had a population of 72. It had a public school from 1868 to 1942, often operating "half-time" or "house to house".

A public school operated at Anembo from 1868 until 1942. For much of this time, it functioned under "half-time" or "house-to-house" arrangements, whereby a single teacher was shared between small rural schools or moved between homesteads (NSW Department of Education archives, as cited in regional school histories). The area lies on the traditional lands of the Ngarigo people, who, along with the Walgalu and southern Ngunnawal, maintain enduring cultural ties to the Monaro.
