= Acacia costiniana =

Costin's wattle

Scientific classification
- Kingdom: Plantae
- Clade: Tracheophytes
- Clade: Angiosperms
- Clade: Eudicots
- Clade: Rosids
- Order: Fabales
- Family: Fabaceae
- Subfamily: Caesalpinioideae
- Clade: Mimosoid clade
- Genus: Acacia
- Species: A. costiniana

Binomial name
- Acacia costiniana Tindale
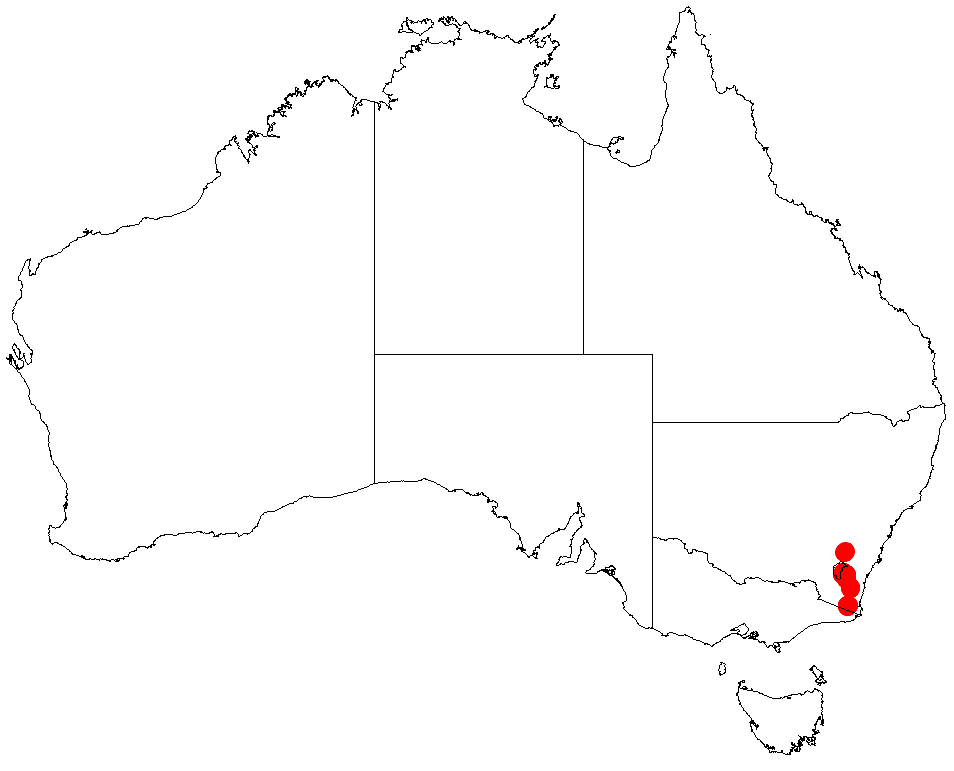
- Occurrence data from AVH

Synonyms
- Racosperma costinianum (Tindale) Pedley

Shrub

Acacia costiniana, commonly known as Costin's wattle, is a species of flowering plant in the family Fabaceae and is endemic to New South Wales, Australia. It is a weeping, multi-stemmed shrub with crowded, mostly ascending to erect, egg-shaped to elliptic phyllodes, oblong to more or less spherical heads of golden or rich lemon yellow flowers and thinly leathery, narrowly oblong pods.

== Description ==
Acacia costiniana is an erect, weeping or spreading shrub that typically grows to a height of 0.6–2.5 m (2 ft 0 in – 8 ft 2 in), its branchlets covered with soft, downy hairs. Its phyllodes are mostly ascending to erect, asymmetrically egg-shaped to elliptic, 5–20 mm (0.20–0.79 in) long and 5–11 mm (0.20–0.43 in) wide, leathery, and sparsely covered with hairs pressed against the surface. There are stipules 1–3 mm (0.039–0.118 in) long at the base of the phyllodes. The flowers are borne in racemes 5–30 mm (0.20–1.18 in) long in oblong to more or less spherical heads, on a peduncle 1.5–10 mm (0.059–0.394 in) long, each head with 14 to 26 golden or rich lemon yellow flowers. Flowering occurs in August and September, and the pods are thinly leathery, narrowly oblong, up to 50 mm (2.0 in) long and 10–12 mm (0.39–0.47 in) wide and covered with velvety, rust-coloured to silvery hairs. The seeds are shiny black, egg-shaped to oblong, 4–6 mm (0.16–0.24 in) long with a club-shaped aril.

== Taxonomy ==
Acacia costiniana was first formally described in 1980 by Mary Tindale in the journal Telopea, from specimens collected on the Tinderry Mountains 13.2 km (8.2 mi) east-south-east of Michelago. The specific epithet (costiniana) honours the "renowned ecologist, Alec Baitllie Costin (1925–2022), formerly of the Division of Plant Industry, CSIRO".

== Distribution ==
Costin's wattle is restricted to the Tinderry Mountains between Captains Flat and the Bombala district, where it is found on rocky slopes in dry sclerophyll forest woodland and heath. It grows at an altitude of around 1,200 m (3,900 ft) on granitic slopes or in gullies, occasionally in heath on the margins of swamps in Eucalyptus forest or woodland.

== See also ==
- List of Acacia species
