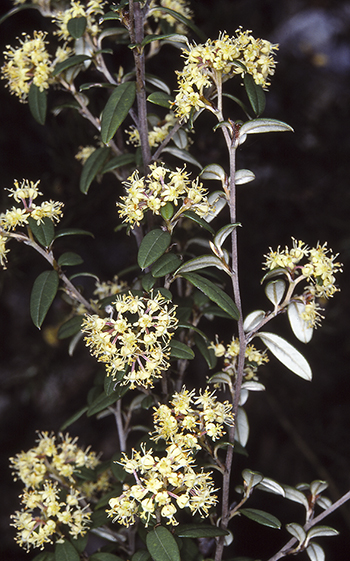
- Near Jingera

Conservation status
- Vulnerable (EPBC Act)

Scientific classification
- Kingdom: Plantae
- Clade: Tracheophytes
- Clade: Angiosperms
- Clade: Eudicots
- Clade: Rosids
- Order: Rosales
- Family: Rhamnaceae
- Genus: Pomaderris
- Species: P. parrisiae

Binomial name
- Pomaderris parrisiae N.G.Walsh

= Pomaderris parrisiae =

Species of plant

Pomaderris parrisiae is a species of flowering plant in the family Rhamnaceae and is endemic to southern New South Wales. It is a shrub to small, slender tree with silvery-hairy branchlets, elliptic to lance-shaped leaves and panicles of hairy, creamy-yellow flowers.

== Description ==
Pomaderris parrisiae is a shrub to slender tree that typically grows to a height of up to 9 m (30 ft), its branchlets and petioles covered with short, silvery hairs. The leaves are elliptic to lance-shaped, mostly 40–80 mm (1.6–3.1 in) long and 10–25 mm (0.39–0.98 in) wide with lance-shaped stipules about 5 mm (0.20 in) long at the base, but that fall off as the leaf develops. The upper surface of the leaves is glabrous and the lower surface is covered with silvery star-shaped hairs. The flowers are borne in pyramid-shaped panicles 30–80 mm (1.2–3.1 in) wide, each flower on a pedicel about 5 mm (0.20 in) long. The sepals are oblong, 2.5–3 mm (0.098–0.118 in) long, creamy-yellow and covered with star-shaped hairs on the back. The petals are egg-shaped with wavy edges, pale yellow and slightly shorter than the sepals. Flowering occurs in October and November and the fruit is a hairy capsule.

== Taxonomy ==
Pomaderris parrisiae was first formally described in 1990 by Neville Grant Walsh in the journal Muelleria from specimens collected in 1987. The specific epithet (parrisiae) honours Margaret Parris of Merimbula, who collected the type specimens.

== Distribution and habitat ==
This pomaderris grows in open forest or rainforest, mainly on the ranges between Kybean and Bemboka including in the Wadbilliga National Park and Egan Peaks Nature Reserve in southern New South Wales.

== Conservation status ==
Pomaderris parrisiae is listed as "vulnerable" under the Australian Government Environment Protection and Biodiversity Conservation Act 1999 and the New South Wales Government Biodiversity Conservation Act 2016. The main threats to the species include illegal use of recreational vehicles, inappropriate fire regimes and disturbance from powerline management and road maintenance activities.
