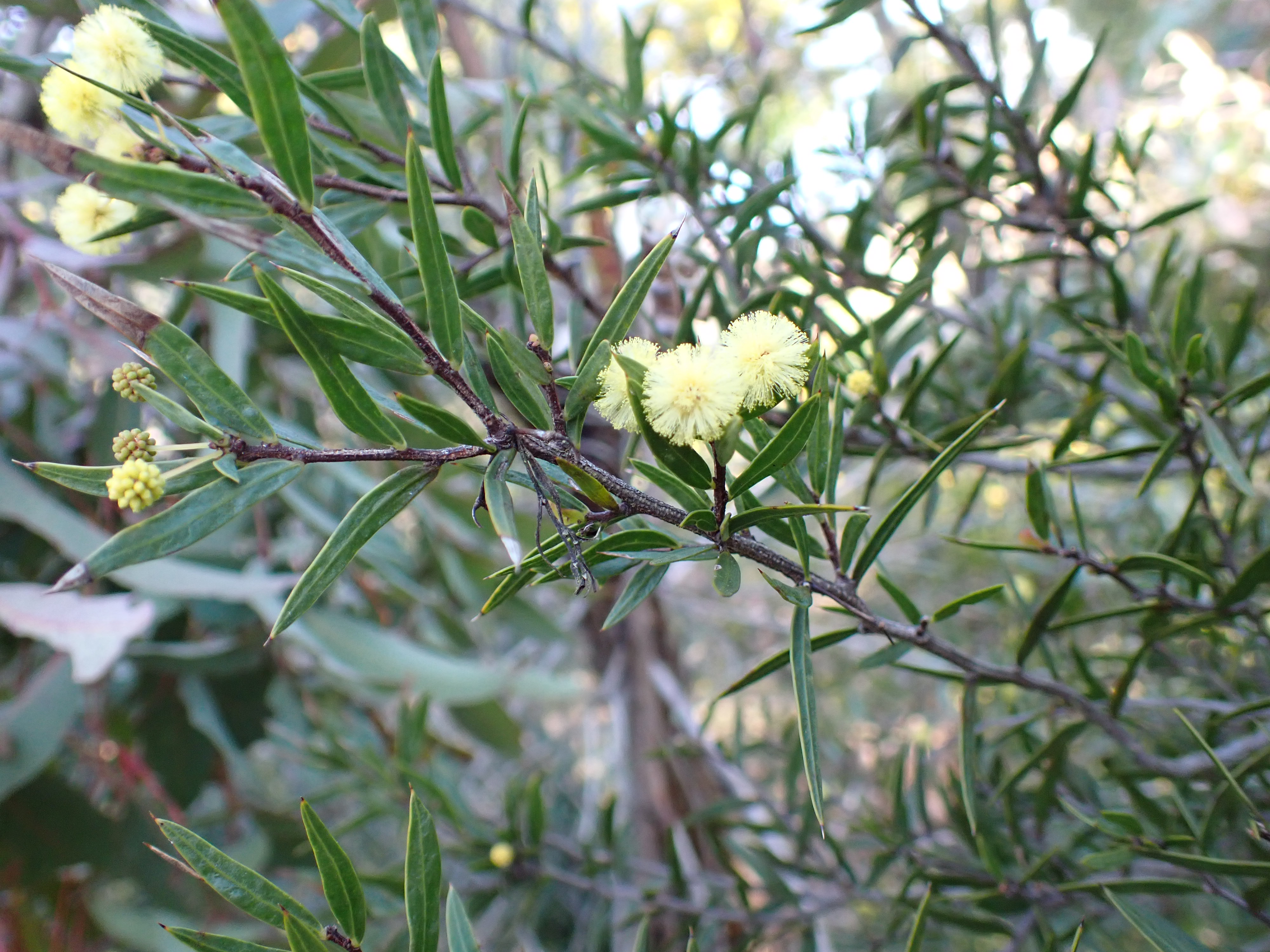

Scientific classification
- Kingdom: Plantae
- Clade: Tracheophytes
- Clade: Angiosperms
- Clade: Eudicots
- Clade: Rosids
- Order: Fabales
- Family: Fabaceae
- Subfamily: Caesalpinioideae
- Clade: Mimosoid clade
- Genus: Acacia
- Species: A. siculiformis

Binomial name
- Acacia siculiformis A.Cunn. ex. Benth.
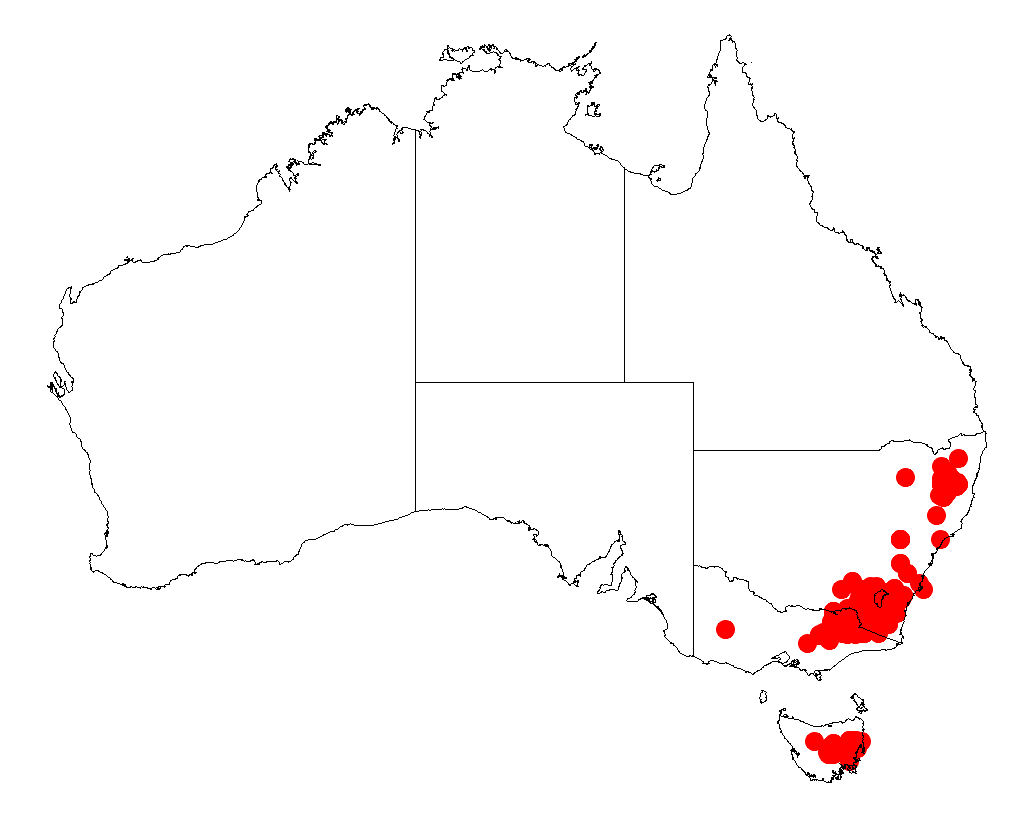
- Occurrence data from AVH

Synonyms
- Acacia siculaeformis A.Cunn. ex Benth. orth. var.; Acacia siculaeformis var. bossiaeoides Benth. orth. var.; Acacia siculiformis var. bossiaeoides Benth.; Acacia siculiformis A.Cunn. ex Benth. var. siculiformis; Acacia stuartiana F.Muell. ex Benth.; Racosperma siculiforme (A.Cunn. ex Benth.) Pedley

= Acacia siculiformis =

Dagger wattle

Species of legume

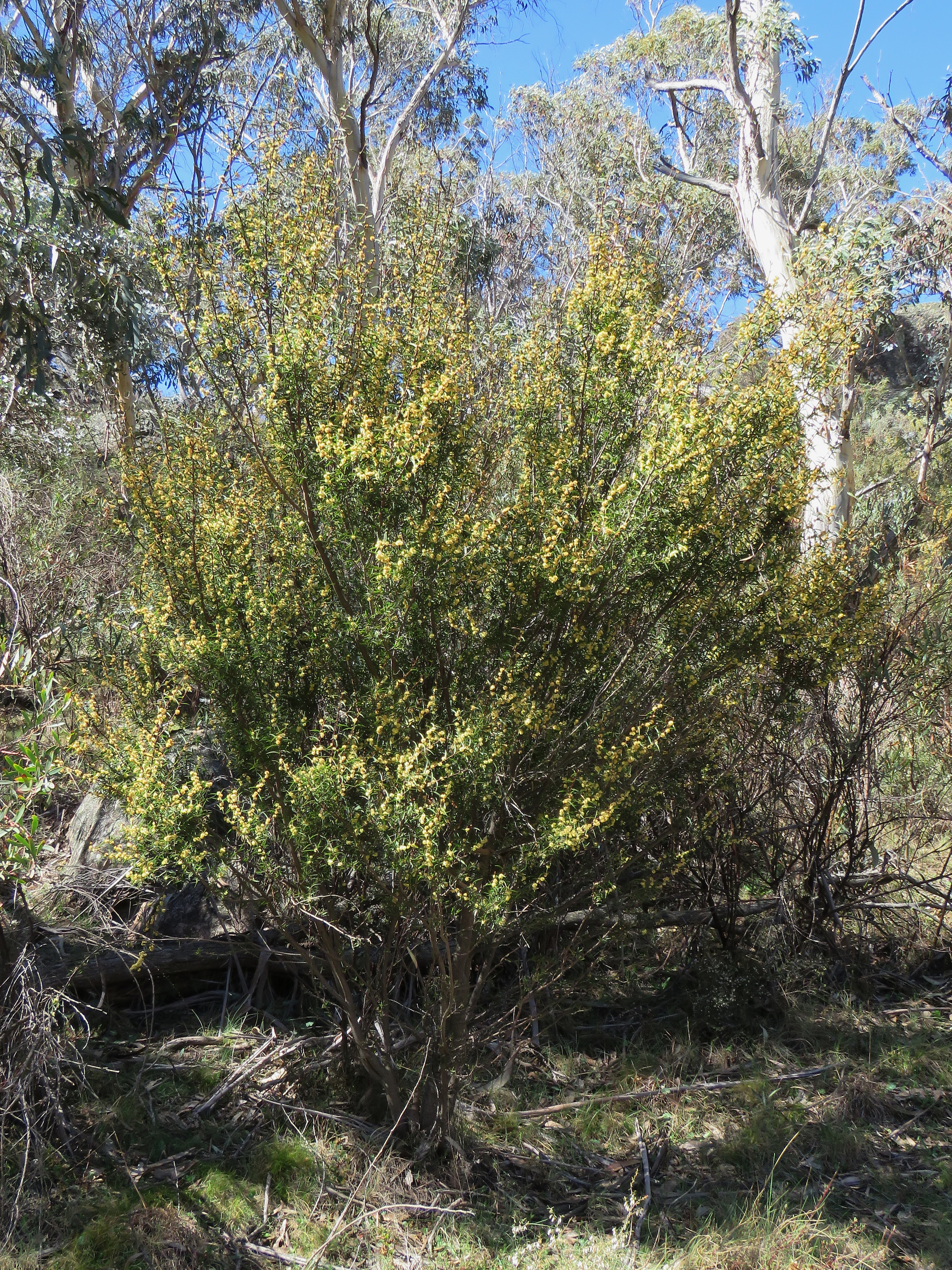
Habit in Namadgi National Park

Acacia siculiformis, commonly known as dagger wattle or creek wattle, is a species of flowering plant in the family Fabaceae and is endemic to the south-east of Australia. It is a glabrous shrub with rigid, sharply pointed, lance-shaped to linear or narrowly elliptic phyllodes, spherical heads of pale yellow flowers and oblong to narrowly oblong, papery pods.

== Description ==
Acacia siculiformis is a glabrous shrub that typically grows to a height of 2–3 m (6 ft 6.7 in – 9 ft 10.1 in) but is sometimes procumbent. Its phyllodes are sessile, rigid, sharply pointed, lance-shaped to linear or narrowly elliptic, 10–35 mm (0.39–1.38 in) long and 1.5–4 mm (0.059–0.157 in) wide. There are stipules about 0.5 mm (0.020 in) long at the base of the phyllodes. The phyllodes are normally slightly asymmetric and have a prominent midrib. The flowers are usually borne in a single spherical head in axils on a peduncle up to 13 mm (0.51 in) long, each head 4.5–7 mm (0.18–0.28 in) in diameter with 30 to 40 pale yellow flowers. Flowering occurs from August to November and the pods are oblong to narrowly oblong and papery, up to 55 mm (2.2 in) long and 4–7 mm (0.16–0.28 in) wide. The seeds are oblong to elliptic, 3.0–3.5 mm (0.12–0.14 in) long and dark greyish brown to black.

== Taxonomy ==
Acacia siculiformis was first formally described in 1842 by George Bentham in the London Journal of Botany from an unpublished description by Allan Cunningham of specimens he had collected. The specific epithet (siculiformis) refers to the dagger-like shape of the phyllodes.

== Distribution and habitat ==
Dagger wattle grows in forest and woodland, often in soils derived from granite. It occurs from northern New South Wales through the Australian Capital Territory to eastern Victoria and a few places in Tasmania. In New South Wales it is found between Glen Innes and Walcha in the north, between Captains Flat and Gundagai in the south, and south through the Australian Capital Territory to Mount Buller in Victoria. It is widespread in north-eastern Victoria in open forest and subalpine woodland, and there are scattered populations in the east of Tasmania.

== Conservation status ==
Acacia siculiformis is listed as "rare" under the Tasmanian Government Threatened Species Protection Act 1995.

== See also ==
- List of Acacia species
