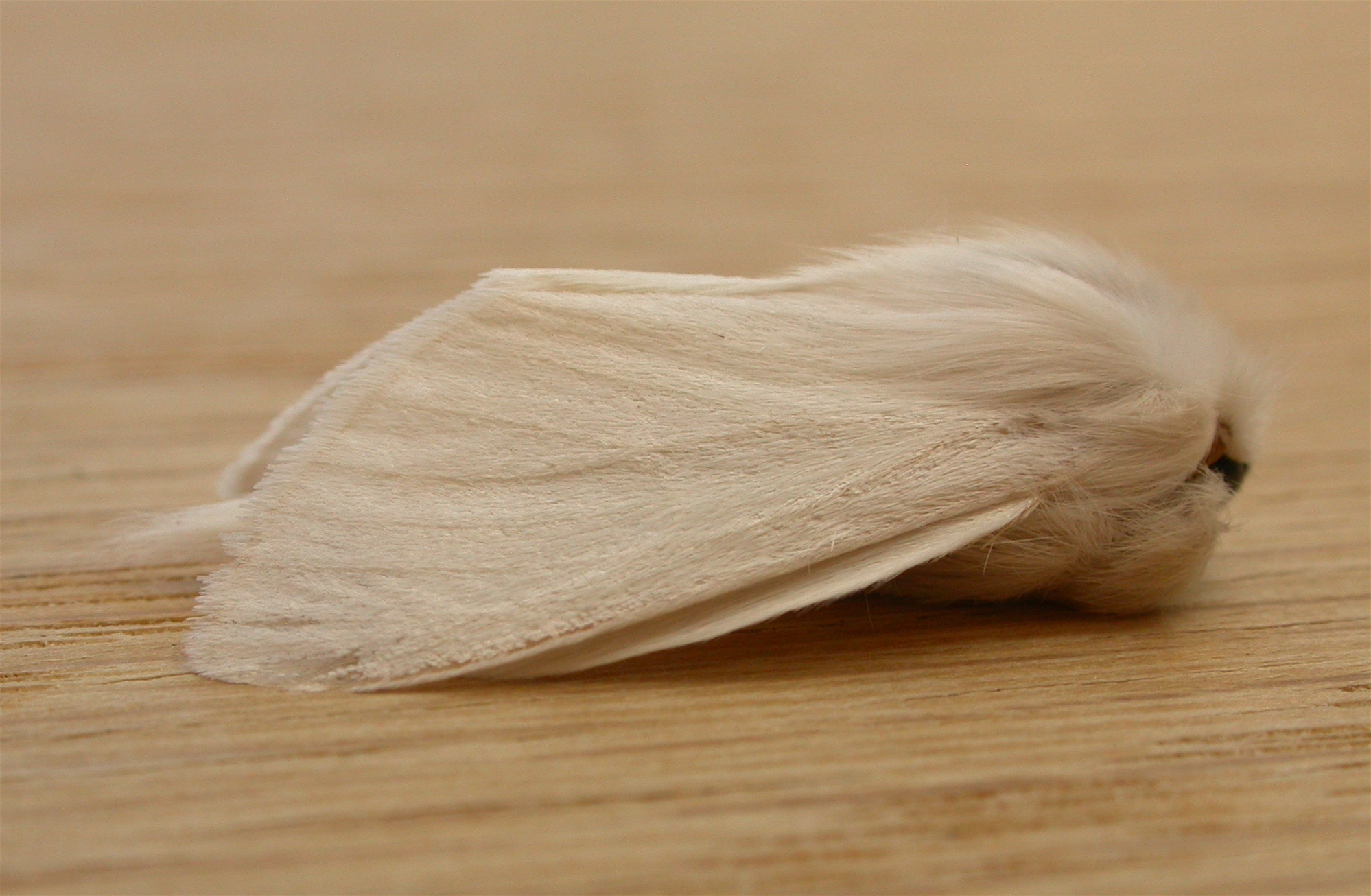

Scientific classification
- Kingdom: Animalia
- Phylum: Arthropoda
- Clade: Pancrustacea
- Class: Insecta
- Order: Lepidoptera
- Superfamily: Noctuoidea
- Family: Notodontidae
- Genus: Trichiocercus
- Species: T. sparshalli

Binomial name
- Trichiocercus sparshalli)Curtis, 1830)

= Trichiocercus sparshalli =

Species of moth

Trichiocercus sparshalli, the long-tailed bombyx or Sparshall's moth, is a moth of the family Notodontidae. It was first described by John Curtis in 1830 and it is found in Australia.

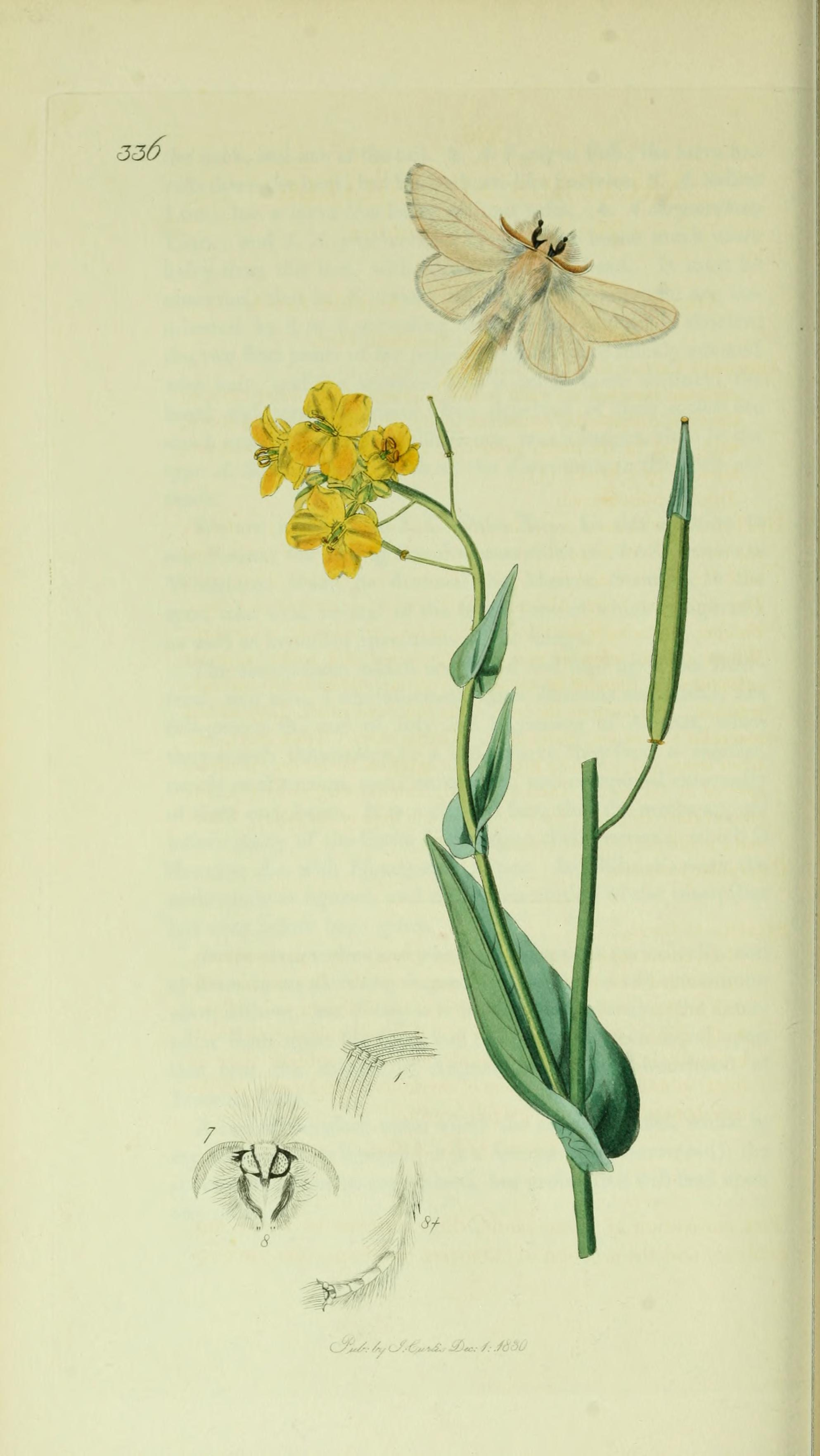
Illustration from John Curtis's British Entomology Volume 5

The wingspan is about 40 mm.

The larvae feed on Eucalyptus cinerea, Eucalyptus leucoxylon, Eucalyptus polyanthemos and Lophostemon confertus.

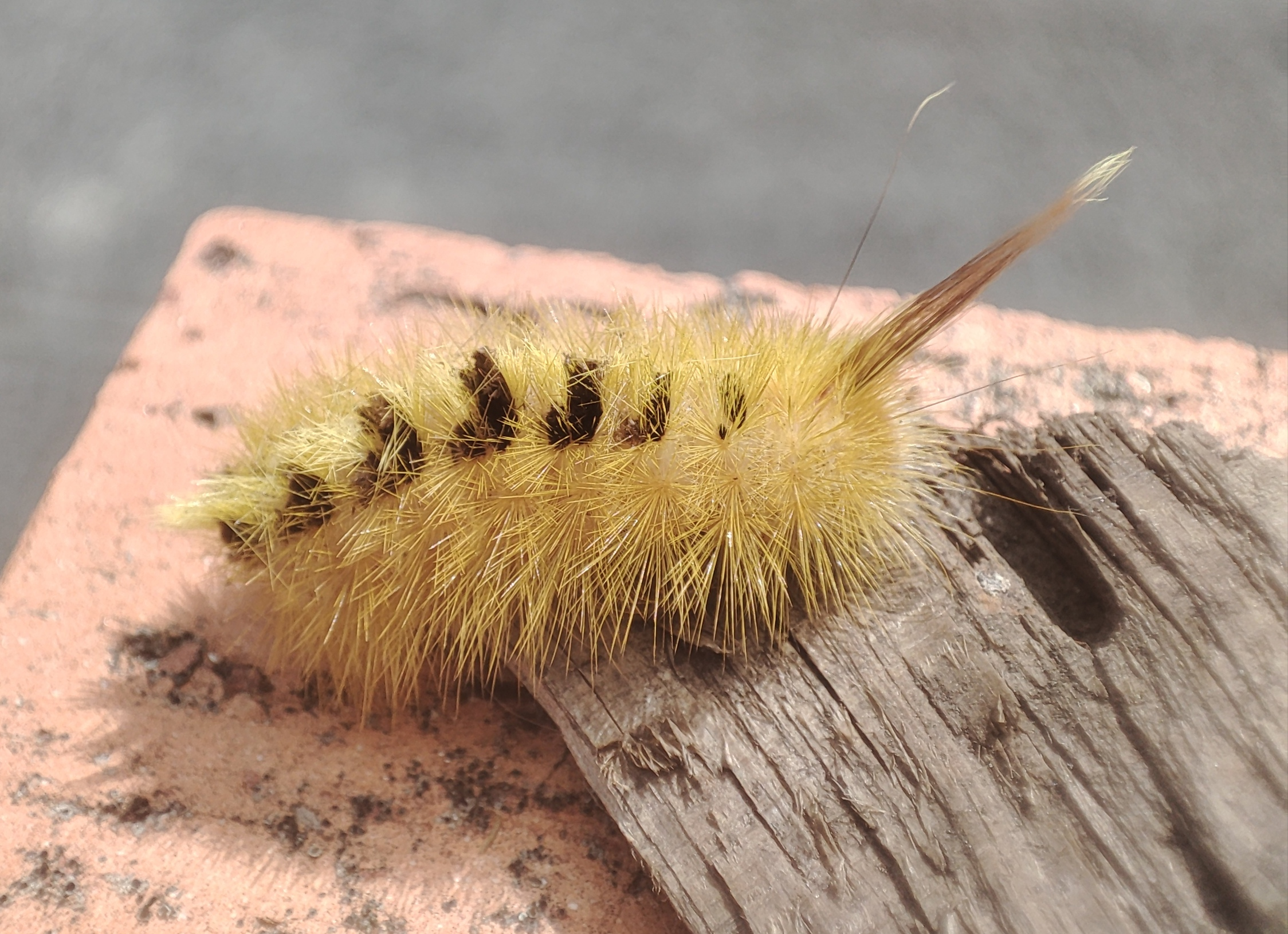
Larvae of Sparshall's Moth. Perth, Western Australia
