= Primrose Valley, New South Wales =

Primrose Valley
- Town
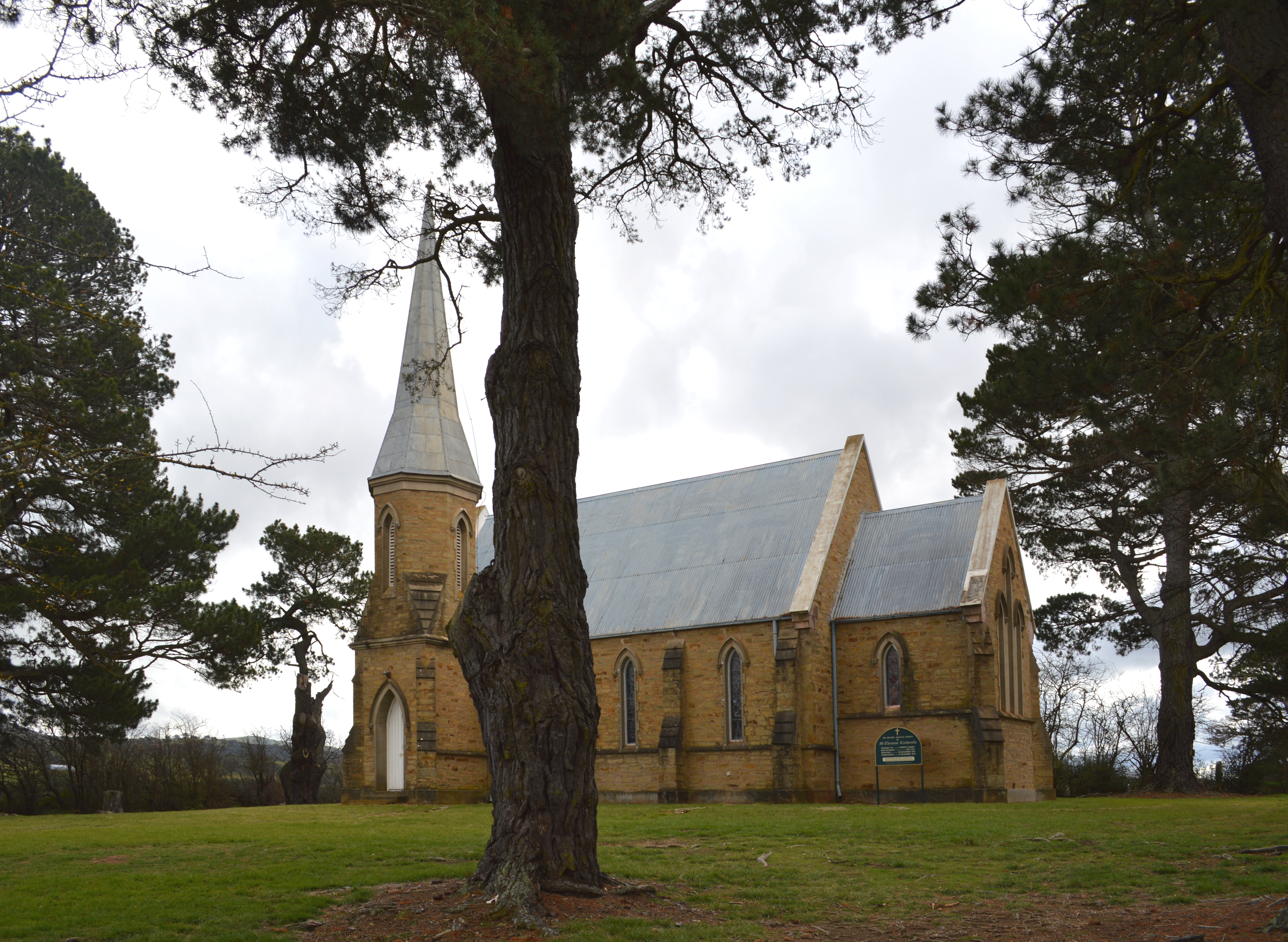
- St Thomas' Anglican church lies in the locality of Primrose Valley and the civil parish of Yanununbeyan, despite the sign indicating that it is in Carwoola. The church was completed in 1874.

- Coordinates: 35°28′59″S 149°23′35″E
- Country: Australia
- State: New South Wales
- Region: Southern Tablelands
- LGA: Queanbeyan-Palerang Regional Council
- Location: 31 km (19 mi) SE of Queanbeyan; 44 km (27 mi) SE of Canberra; 34 km (21 mi) NW of Captains Flat

Government
  - State electorate: Monaro
  - Federal division: Eden-Monaro

Population
  - Total: 146 (2016 census)
- Postcode: 2621
- County: Murray
- Parish: Yanununbeyan
Localities around Primrose Valley
Carwoola	Hoskinstown	Rossi
Yarrow	Primrose Valley	Rossi
Urila	Captains Flat	Captains Flat

Primrose Valley is a locality in the Queanbeyan–Palerang Regional Council area, New South Wales, Australia. It is located on the road from Queanbeyan to Captains Flat about 33 km southeast of Queanbeyan and 25 km north of Captains Flat. At the 2016 census, it had a population of 146. It had a provisional school from 1884 to 1886 and a half-time school from 1887 to 1889.
