= Parish of Molonglo =

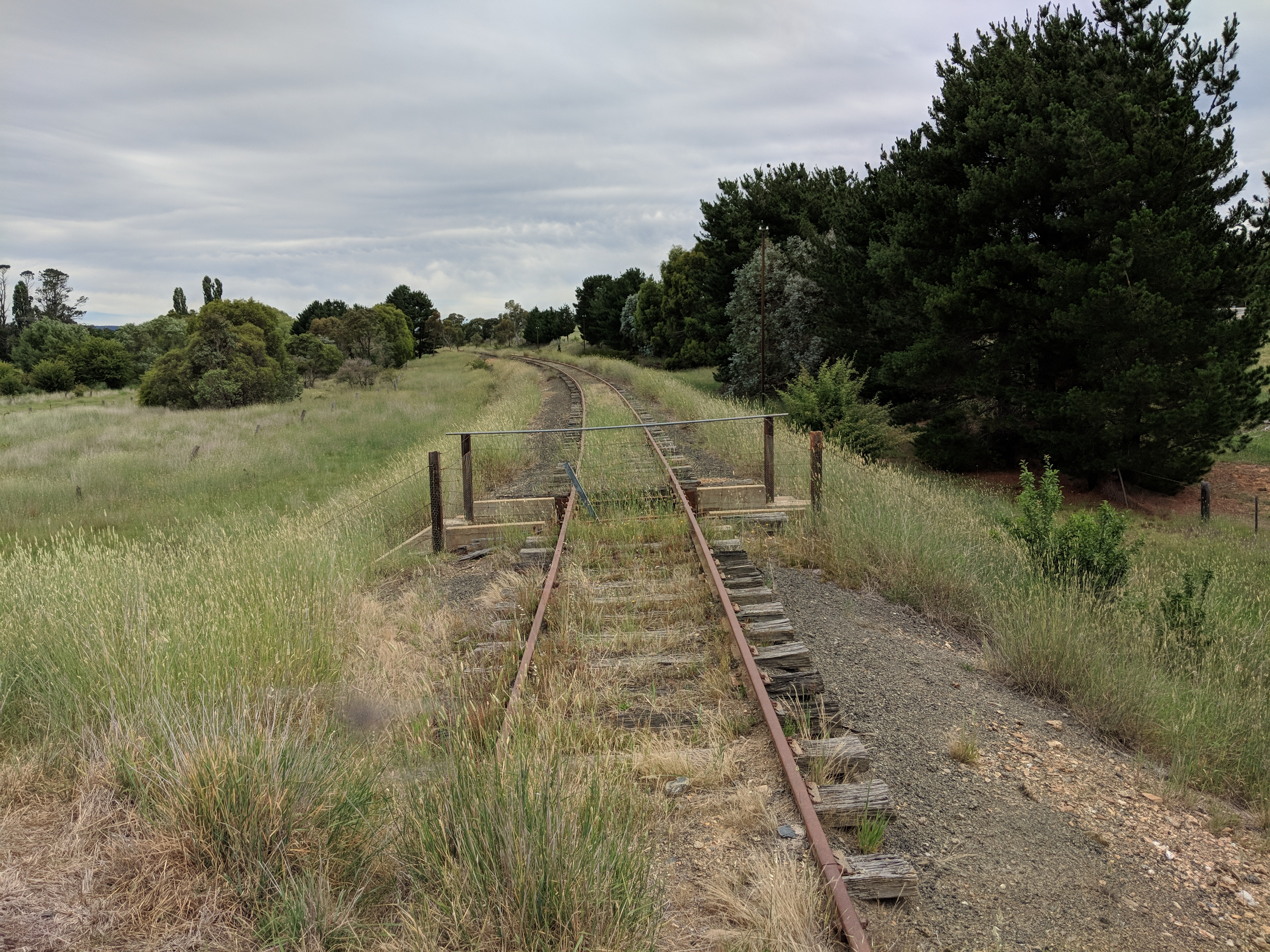
The abandoned Captains Flat railway line in Hoskinstown

Molonglo Parish, New South Wales is a civil parish of Murray County.

The parish is located at 35°24′54″S 149°29′04″E, on the Molongolo River upstream from Queanbeyan. It includes Hoskinstown and Forbes Creek.
