= Jerangle =

- Town
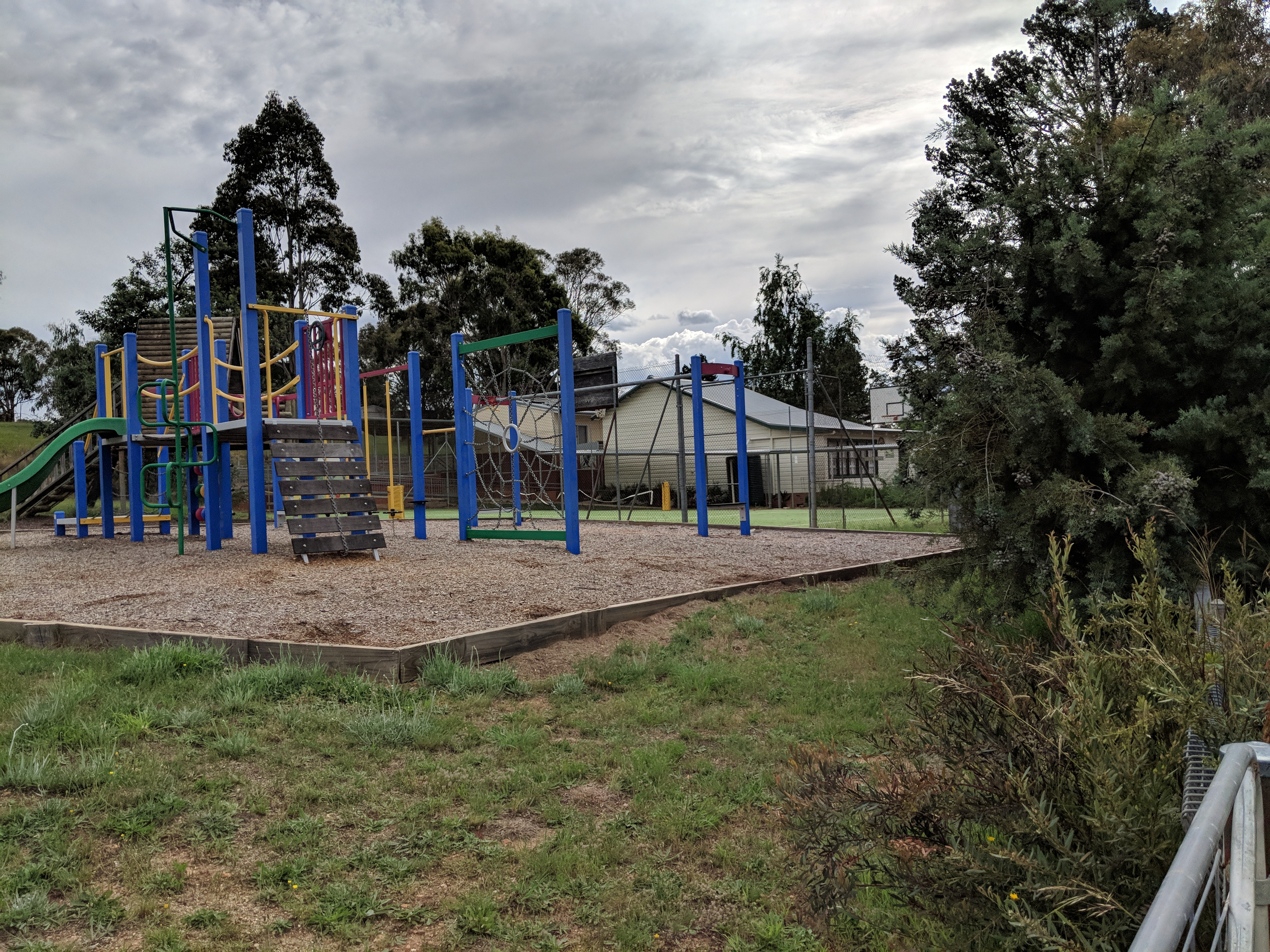
- Jerangle Public School

- Coordinates: 35°52′13″S 149°21′54″E
- Country: Australia
- State: New South Wales
- LGA: Snowy Monaro Regional Council
- Location: 366 km (227 mi) SW of Sydney; 112 km (70 mi) SSE of Canberra; 63 km (39 mi) NE of Cooma

Government
  - State electorate: Monaro
  - Federal division: Eden-Monaro
- Elevation: 1,120 m (3,670 ft)

Population
  - Total: 96 (2016 census)
- Postcode: 2630
Localities around Jerangle
Michelago	Tinderry	Anembo
Colinton	Jerangle	Jinden
Bredbo	Peak View	Snowball

Jerangle is a locality in New South Wales, Australia. The locality is in the Snowy Monaro Regional Council local government area, 366 kilometres (227 mi) south of the state capital, Sydney and 112 kilometres (70 mi) south-east of the national capital, Canberra. At the 2016 census, Jerangle had a population of 96.

Jerangle has a cemetery, two churches, a school, a Country Women's Association hall and phone box. The main location is the school; Jerangle Public School. This school has had small numbers of students that range from 6 to 20. The school was established as a "house to house" school in 1884, but has operated at a permanent location since 1892, although generally as a "half-time" school until 1923.
