= Jingera =

- Town
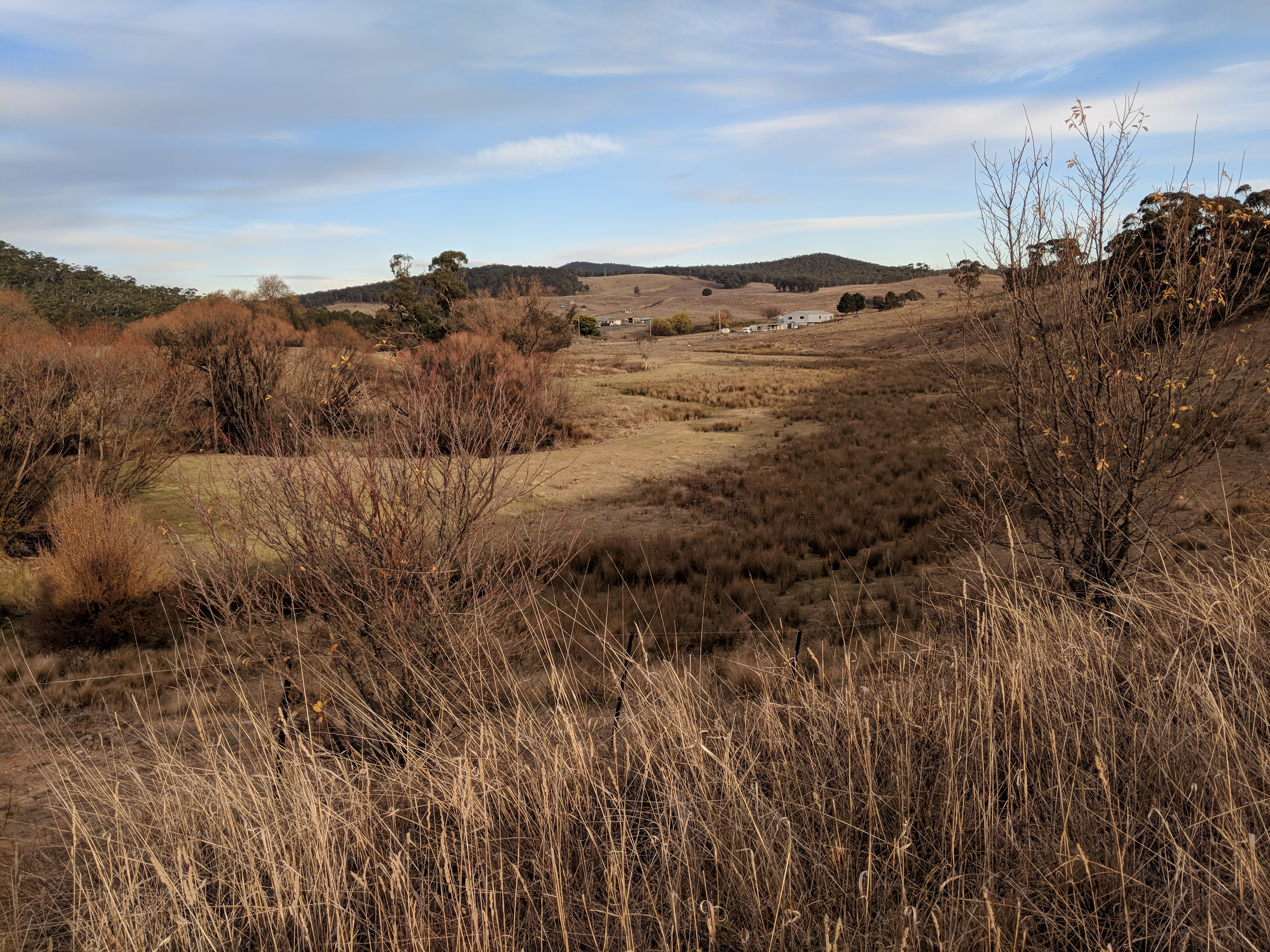

- Coordinates: 35°40′57″S 149°26′02″E
- Country: Australia
- State: New South Wales
- Region: Monaro
- LGA: Snowy Monaro Regional Council
- Location: 67 km (42 mi) SE of Canberra; 57 km (35 mi) SE of Queanbeyan; 86 km (53 mi) NNE of Cooma; 122 km (76 mi) W of Batemans Bay; 331 km (206 mi) SW of Sydney

Government
  - State electorate: Monaro
  - Federal division: Eden-Monaro
- Elevation: 908 m (2,979 ft)

Population
  - Total: 39 (SAL 2016)
- Postcode: 2621
- County: Beresford
- Parish: Sherlock
Localities around Jingera
| Captains Flat | Captains Flat | Kindervale |
| Tinderry | Jingera | Jerrabattgulla |
| Tinderry | Anembo | Hereford Hall |

Jingera (/dʒɪŋɡərə/) is a locality in the Snowy Monaro Region, New South Wales, Australia. It lies south of Captains Flat and northeast of Bredbo. At the 2021 census, it had a population of 39. It had a public school from 1889 to 1911 and from 1914 to 1941, often operating "half-time".

In 1867, the locality was the site of the ambush and murder of four police constables by the notorious gang led by the Clarke brothers.
