= Parish of Ballallaba =

Ballallaba Parish is a civil parish of Murray County, New South Wales.

Located at 35°33′54″S 149°28′04″E, the parish is on the Ballallaba Creek and Molongolo River in Queanbeyan-Palerang Regional Council and the only town in the parish is Captains Flat.
