= Urila =

- Town
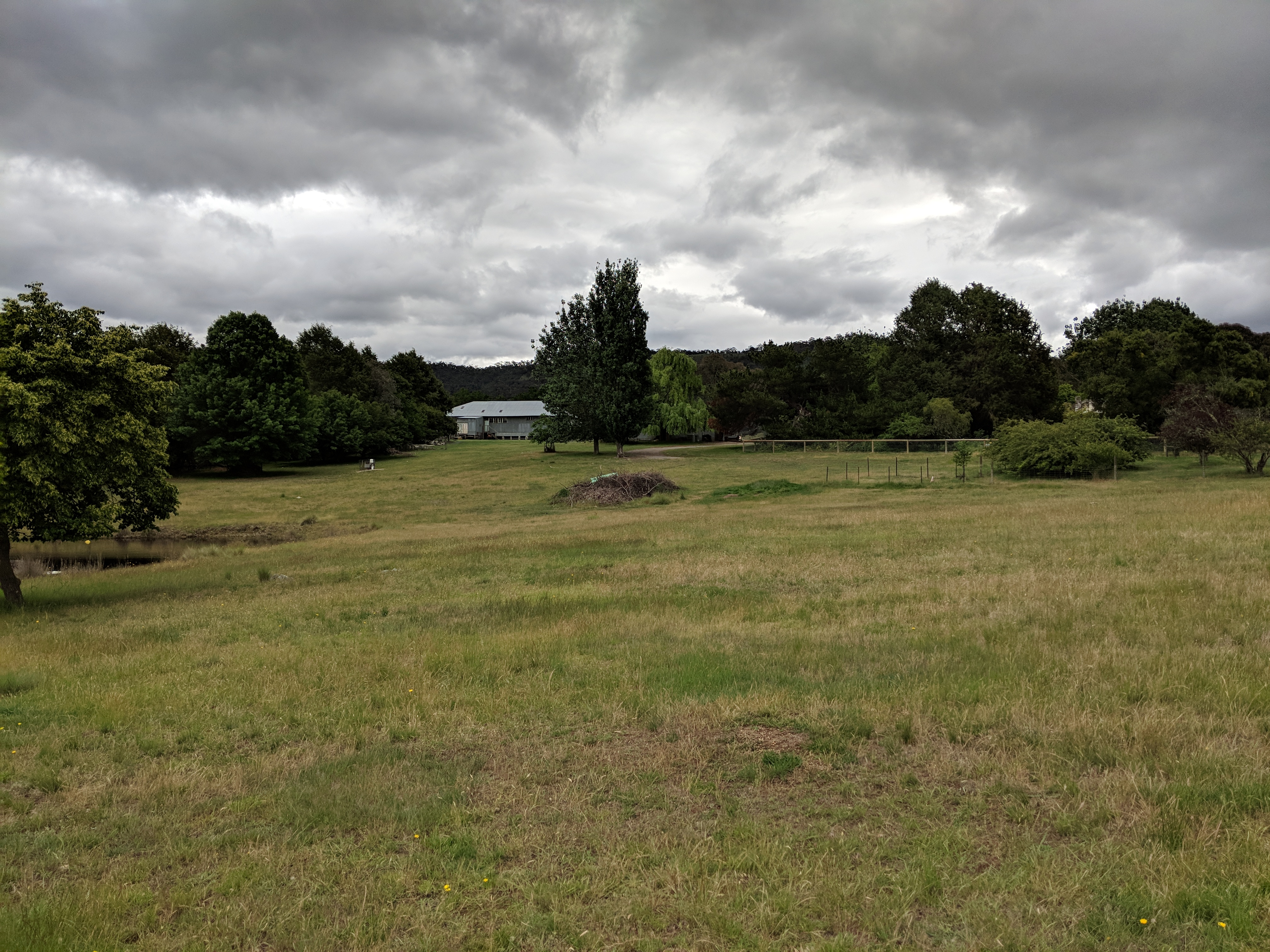
- Urila

- Coordinates: 35°33′47″S 149°17′10″E
- Country: Australia
- State: New South Wales
- Region: Southern Tablelands
- LGA: Queanbeyan-Palerang Regional Council
- Location: 53 km (33 mi) SW of Canberra; 34 km (21 mi) S of Queanbeyan

Government
  - State electorate: Monaro
  - Federal division: Eden-Monaro

Population
  - Total: 142 (2016 census)
- Postcode: 2620
- County: Murray
- Parish: Urialla
Localities around Urila
Googong	Yarrow	Primrose Valley
Burra	Urila	Captains Flat
Burra	Tinderry	Tinderry

Urila is a locality in the Queanbeyan-Palerang Region, New South Wales, Australia. It is a rural residential area located to the east of Burra. At the 2016 census, it had a population of 142.
