= Hoskinstown =

- Town
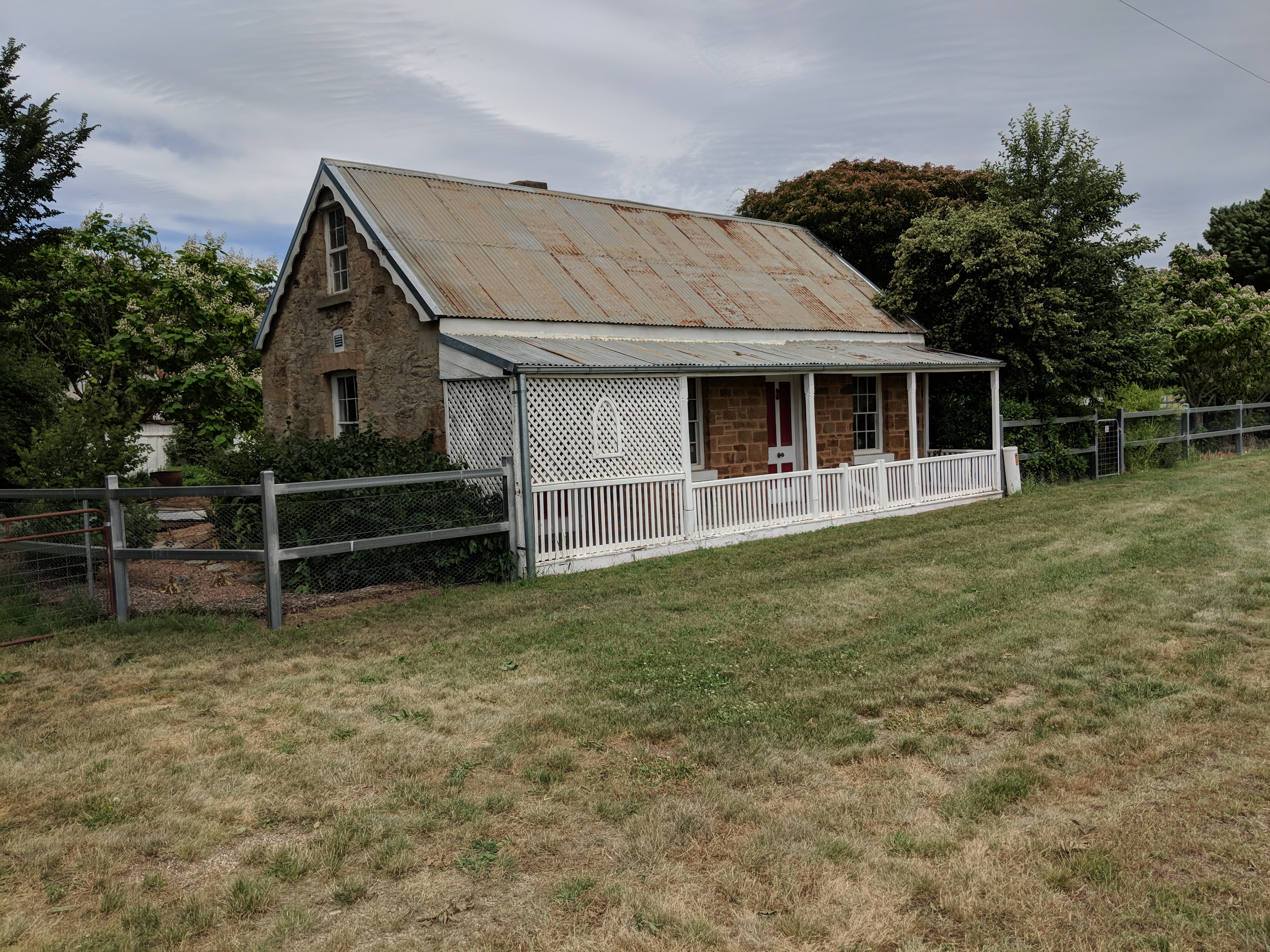
- House at Hoskinstown, which was once a part of the Victoria Hotel building.

- Coordinates: 35°24′57″S 149°27′02″E
- Country: Australia
- State: New South Wales
- Region: Southern Tablelands
- LGA: Queanbeyan-Palerang Regional Council
- Location: 38 km (24 mi) ESE of Canberra; 26 km (16 mi) ESE of Queanbeyan; 127 km (79 mi) WNW of Batemans Bay; 299 km (186 mi) SW of Sydney

Government
  - State electorate: Monaro
  - Federal division: Eden-Monaro
- Elevation: 761 m (2,497 ft)

Population
  - Total: 191 (2021 census)
- Postcode: 2621
- County: Murray
- Parish: Molonglo
Localities around Hoskinstown
Bungendore	Bungendore	Bungendore
Carwoola	Hoskinstown	Forbes Creek
Primrose Valley	Captains Flat	Rossi

Hoskinstown is a locality in Queanbeyan-Palerang Regional Council, New South Wales, Australia. The locality, and what remains of the cluster of settlement of the same name, is 38 km southeast of Canberra the Capital city of Australia, and 299 km southwest of Sydney. At the 2021 census, it had a population of 191.

The area now known as Hoskinstown lies on the traditional lands of Ngarigo people.

Hoskinstown, was known previously as Hoskingtown; it was named after John Hosking (1805-1882), a Sydney merchant, first elected mayor of Sydney, and the owner of the nearby Foxlow station—its name was derived from his wife Martha's middle name—which he took up around 1835. Part of what was once Hoskings' landholding extended to part of the area occupied by the settlement at Hoskinstown.

The area lay of a road route, between Queanbeyan and Braidwood. Prior to 1870, it was known as 'Blackheath', a name in use since at least as early as 1835. Possibly due to confusion with the newer Blue Mountains township of Blackheath, the name of the newly-opened post office at 'Blackheath' was, only months later in 1870, changed to 'Hoskin's Town'. From around the same time, the name for the small settlement and its surrounding area became 'Hoskingtown', until around 1896, when it became Hoskinstown. Its name has been variously spelt as 'Hoskingtown', 'Hoskingstown', 'Hoskins Town', 'Hoskington', and 'Hoskintown', before, Hoskinstown, became the variant that was used universally. The post office was only renamed from 'Hoskin's Town' to Hoskinstown in 1925.

Hoskinstown's urban portion seems never to have been proclaimed a village—possibly another reason for the confusion about the spelling of its name—and was best described as a cluster of settlement; it was centred on Hoskinstown Road, roughly between modern-day Plains Road and Rossi Road.

Hoskinstown is known for the Molonglo Observatory Synthesis Telescope operated by the University of Sydney.

It had a public school from 1869 to 1967, aside from a mysterious event, in 1934, when the building was partially dismantled, without notice or explanation, but then restored. The site of the school was excised from land that was once owned by John Hosking. The school building built, in 1929, has been converted to a private residence,

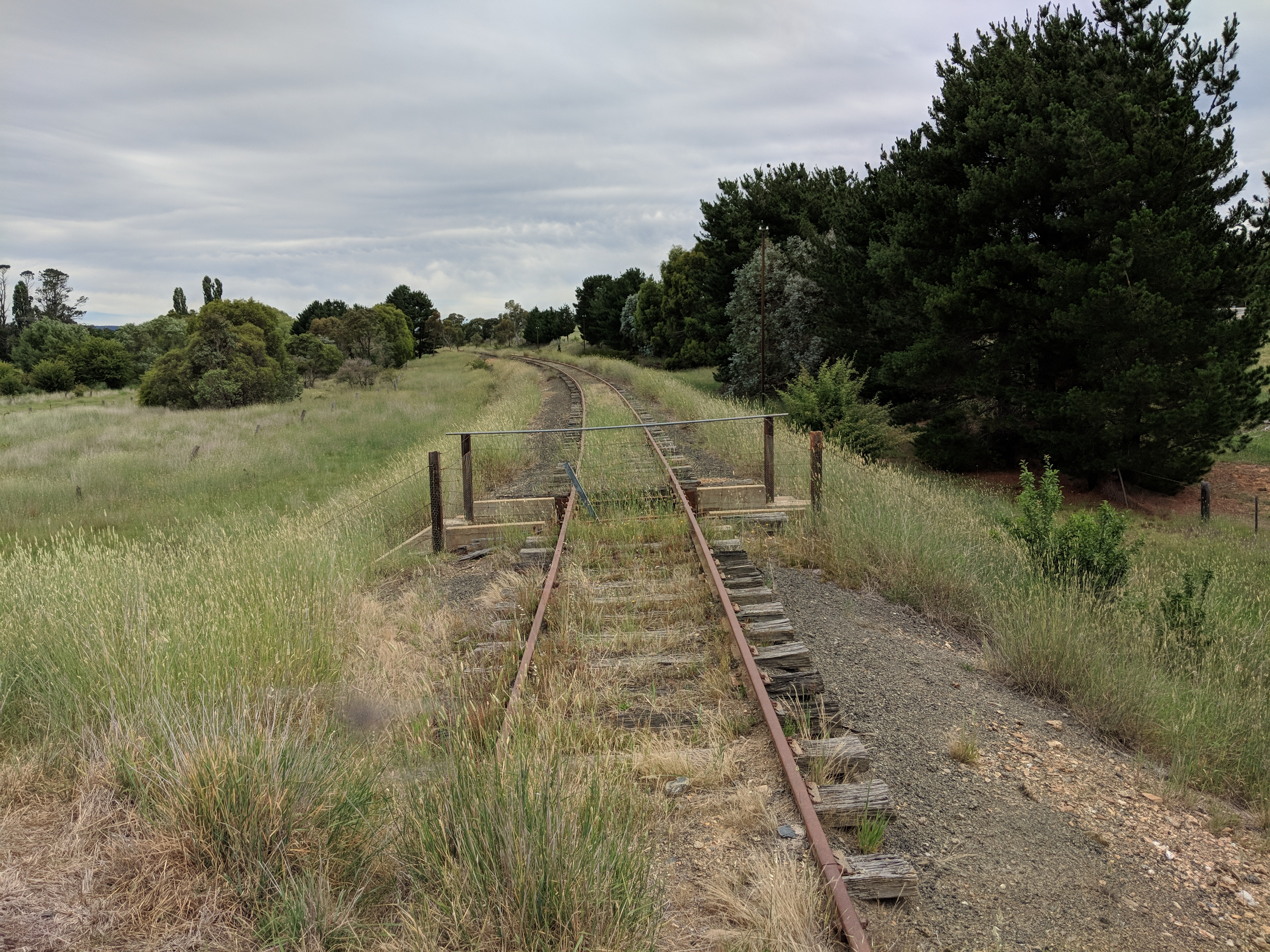
Captains Flat railway line at Hoskinstown

Hoskinstown platform was opened along with the Captains Flat railway line in 1940, and it closed, in August 1968, a year before the line. It was a small short-platform structure.

The settlement once had a hotel, the Victoria Hotel. During the 1930s, a house that contained the post office and store also seems to have operated, at times, as a 'sly grog' outlet. The post office closed at the end of November 1967.

The Catholic Church is dedicated to Saint Peter and Paul. There is also an Anglican Church, St Marks. Both churches have a cemetery. During the years when there was widespread sectarianism in Australia, Hoskinstown was a notable exception, with the two churches holding combined social and sporting events, with the funds raised being shared.

Hoskinstown has a public hall that opened in 1928. The public hall is used for public events of the Hoskinstown-Rossi Rural Fire Service brigade, although the brigade has its own building next to the Anglican Church.
