= Captains Flat railway line =

Former railway line in New South Wales, Australia

Captains Flat line

The Captains Flat railway line was a country branch line in the Southern Tablelands region of New South Wales. The line branched off the Bombala line at Bungendore Junction, 5 km south of Bungendore and terminated 34 km further south at Captain's Flat.

== Mining leads to a call for a railway ==
Mining activity at Captains Flat began in 1882 on copper ore bodies. A railway connection from Bungendore to Captains Flat to support mining operations was considered as early as 1897, but the poor performance of the mine meant that a railway would not be economically viable. As the depth of mining increased, the constitution of the lode changed and the ore proved too complex to treat. From 1899 to 1926, production continued on a restricted basis but, during that period, technological improvements were made which meant that the lode could be economically mined. A pilot plant was erected to demonstrate the practicability of renewed mining.

A trial survey of a railway to Captains Flat was completed in May 1928. The proposal was referred to the Parliamentary Standing Committee on Public Works on 27 March 1929. Legislation authorising the construction of the line was passed on 16 June 1930. Due to the prevailing worldwide financial depression, the New South Wales government petitioned the federal government in 1929 for the Commonwealth Railways to construct the line and make it available to the New South Wales Government Railways, under a similar arrangement to the Queanbeyan to Canberra railway. The proposal was rejected the following year and the railway was shelved.

== Construction ==
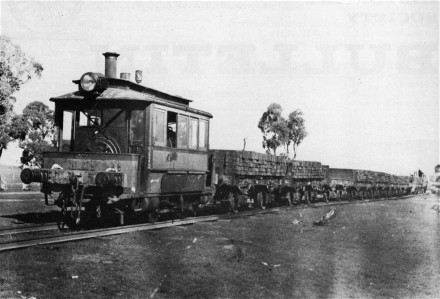
Sydney steam tram motor 101A used in the construction of the line

The line was re-surveyed, and another construction act was passed on 15 December 1937. Construction commenced in February, 1938, with 600 men employed. By June, work on the foundations for piers of bridges spanning Thurralilly Creek and Molonglo River was in hand. The strengthening girders came from the original viaducts over Wollondilly, Boxers and Barbers Creeks on the Main South line which had been replaced during duplication work in the 1912–14 period.

Some of the rails used in the construction of the line came from the Matakana – Mount Hope branch which closed on 6 July 1924.

On 7 February 1939, the line was made available for traffic to a point beyond Hoskinstown, where a temporary siding and unloading facilities were provided. Loads of concentrate were conveyed from Captains Flat by road to that transfer point. On 28 November 1939, the line was open to Captain's Flat under construction conditions, but Mines Department records indicate that conveyance of concentrates from the mine began in October 1939. The Captain's Flat line opened for general traffic on 17 June 1940 when a tri-weekly rail motor service began.

== Operations ==
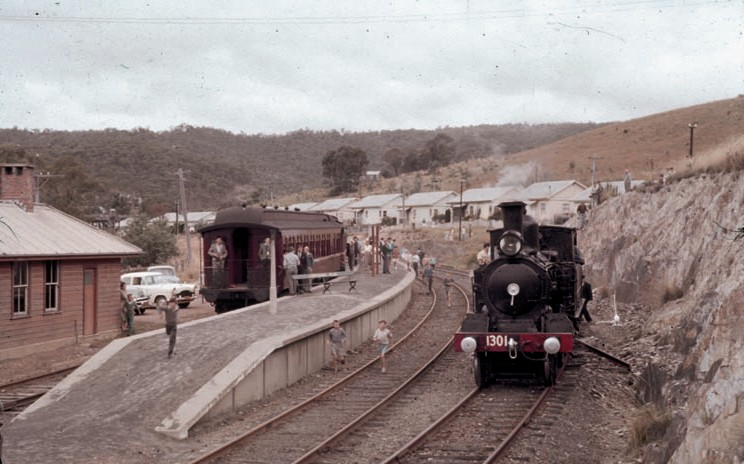
An enthusiast's special at Captain's Flat, January 1962

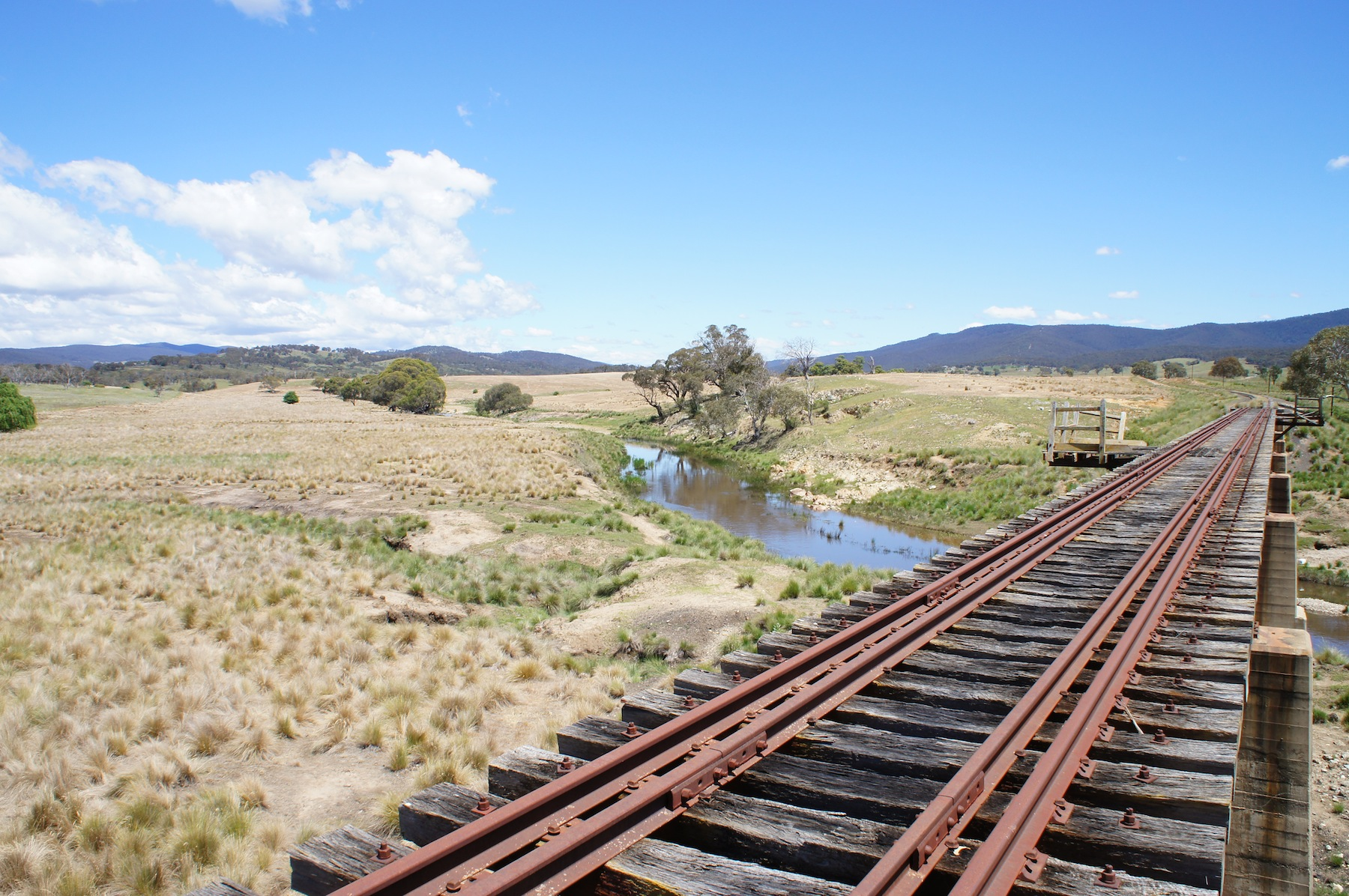
Molonglo River bridge

The new line was 21 miles 11.25 chains (34.0 km) long and was worked under Ordinary Train Staff and Ticket conditions.

During November, 1940, a halt with a small passenger platform was built at Hoskinstown, and a stopping place was also provided at Foxlow, where stops were made to pick and set down passengers and parcels. The station at Captain's Flat was an island platform, but the station building was at ground level, on the down side of the platform.

Local passenger traffic was never significant. On one occasion, a direct rail motor service was provided on Saturdays between Captain's Flat and Queanbeyan and return, without proceeding into Bungendore, for the convenience of passengers wishing to spend the afternoon in Queanbeyan. By November 1960, passenger traffic had dropped considerably, due to the improvement of the road to Queanbeyan, which was substantially shorter than travelling via Bungendore. The rail passenger service was discontinued in 1960. Subsequently, a small number of passengers were able to be transported in the brake van of the thrice-weekly freight train.

Mining ceased on 9 March 1962. During operations, nearly four million tons of ore were excavated. By April, 1964, services were reduced to just one goods train a week, and the line was closed to traffic on 28 August 1968.

On Sunday, 10 August 1969, the line was temporarily re-opened as the location for the railway scenes in the feature film, Ned Kelly, starring Mick Jagger. The special train scheduled for the film was hauled by Locomotive 1243, which was renumbered 176 for the film, and fitted with a kerosene headlamp.

== Subsequent developments ==
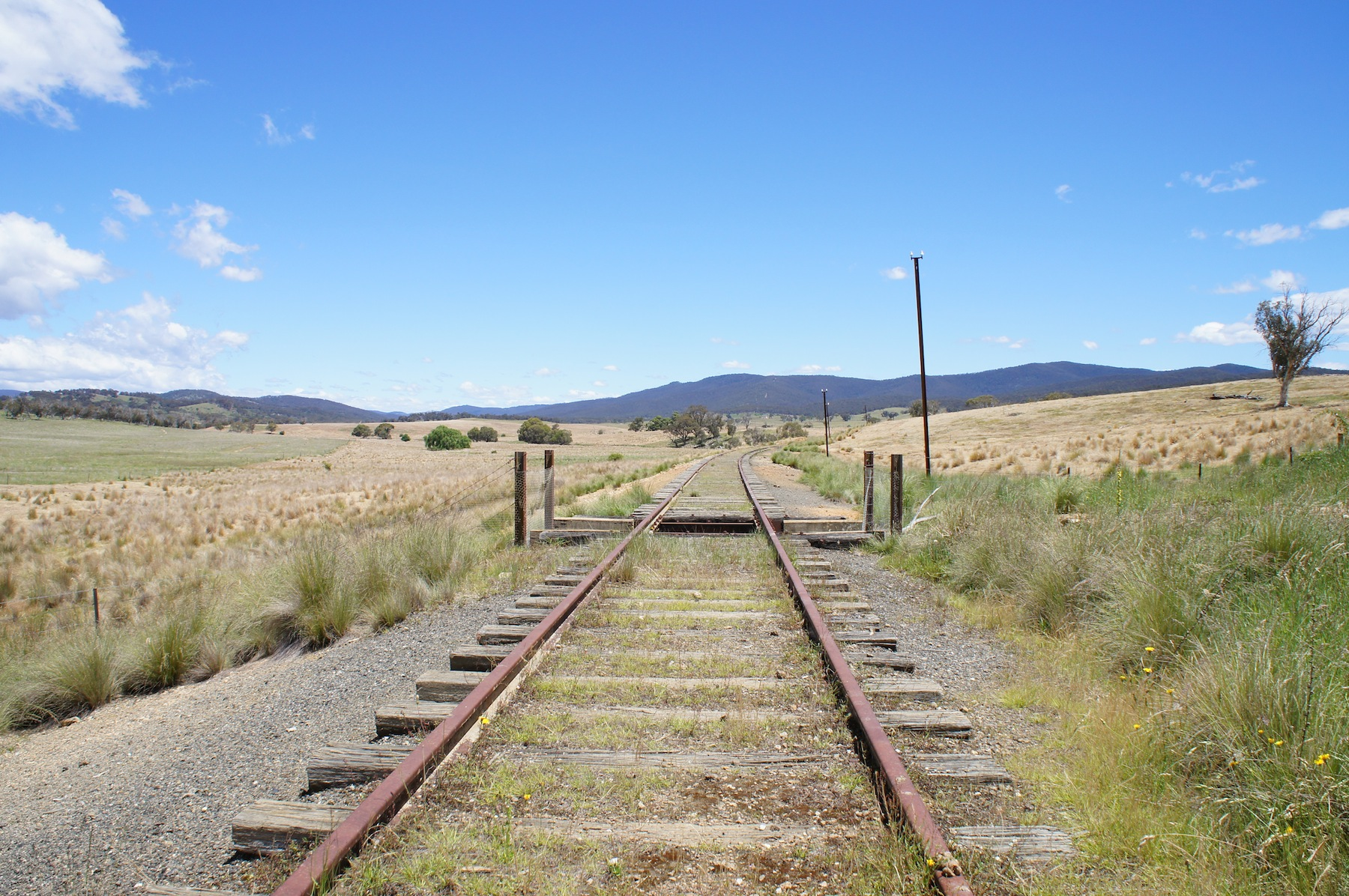
The track in 2011

In 1974, the derelict railway station at Captains Flat was converted into a private home.

In 1993, the NSW Department of Transport called for expressions of interest on the future use of the line. Registrations closed in August that year. It was understood that there was an interest in creating a walking track or a tourist railway over the last section of the line into Captain's Flat. By that date, the town was a fraction of its peak size.

A Canberra resident registered his interest in returning the line to an operational condition. He expected to complete his rehabilitation within two years, but there was no progress.

== See also ==
- Rail transport in New South Wales
