= Tinderry =

- Town
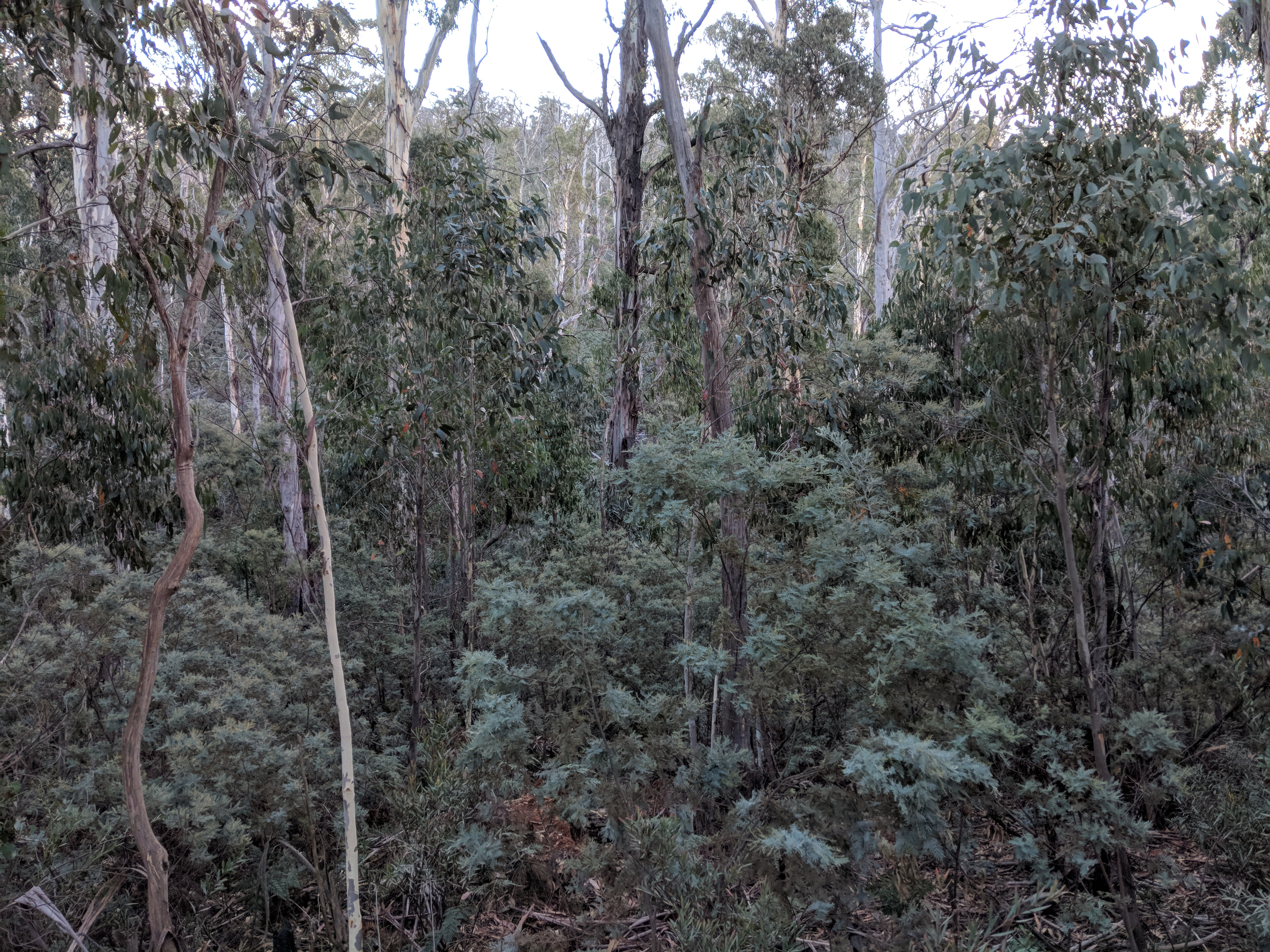
- Tinderry Nature Reserve

- Coordinates: 35°41′57″S 149°19′02″E
- Country: Australia
- State: New South Wales
- Region: Monaro
- LGA: Snowy Monaro Regional Council
- Location: 70 km (43 mi) S of Canberra; 66 km (41 mi) S of Queanbeyan; 86 km (53 mi) N of Cooma; 146 km (91 mi) W of Batemans Bay; 356 km (221 mi) SW of Sydney

Government
  - State electorate: Monaro
  - Federal division: Eden-Monaro
- Elevation: 1,095 m (3,593 ft)

Population
  - Total: 59 (SAL 2021)
- Postcode: 2620
- County: Beresford
- Parish: Wise; Tinderry
Localities around Tinderry
Burra	Urila	Jingera
Michelago	Tinderry	Anembo
Michelago	Jerangle	Anembo

Tinderry is a locality in the Snowy Monaro Region, New South Wales, Australia. It lies to the east of Michelago and South West of Captains Flat. At the 2016 census, it had a population of 66. The western part of the locality lies on the Tinderry Range, which includes Tinderry Peak (1,619 m (5,312 ft)) and Tinderry Twin Peak. A large part of the mountainous terrain forms Tinderry Nature Reserve. Further east the terrain is more open and includes grazing country and the small settlement of Little Tinderry. A public school was located at Little Tinderry from 1899 to 1913, generally described as "half-time", but "provisional" in 1900 and early 1901.
