= Hereford Hall, New South Wales =

Hereford Hall New South Wales
- Coordinates: 35°47′17″S 149°33′6″E
- Population: 24 (2016 census)
- Postcode(s): 2622
- Time zone: AEST (UTC+10)
  - Summer (DST): AEDT (UTC+11)
- LGA(s): Queanbeyan–Palerang Regional Council
- Region: Southern Tablelands
- State electorate(s): Monaro
- Federal division(s): Eden-Monaro

Hereford Hall is a small rural locality in the Queanbeyan–Palerang Regional Council, part of the Southern Tablelands region of New South Wales, Australia.

At the 2016 census, the town recorded a population of 24.
