= Captains Flat =

- Town
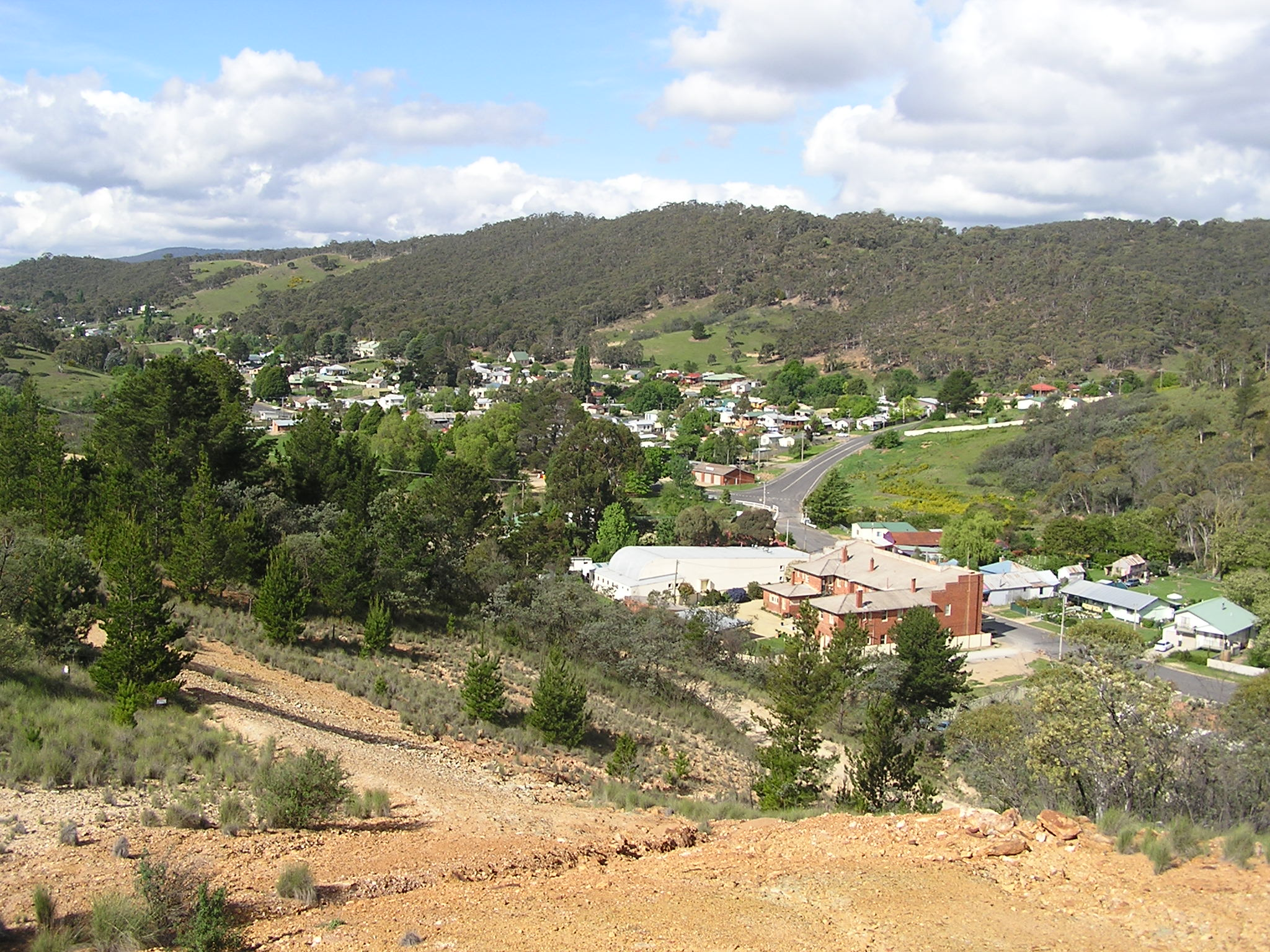
- Captains Flat from Mine Hill

- Coordinates: 35°35′19″S 149°26′51″E
- Country: Australia
- State: New South Wales
- LGA: Queanbeyan-Palerang Regional Council
- Location: 61 km (38 mi) SE of Canberra; 45 km (28 mi) SE of Queanbeyan; 99 km (62 mi) NNE of Cooma; 110 km (68 mi) W of Batemans Bay; 322 km (200 mi) SW of Sydney
- Established: 1883

Government
  - State electorate: Monaro
  - Federal division: Eden-Monaro
- Elevation: 852 m (2,795 ft)

Population
  - Total: 473 (UCL 2021)
- Postcode: 2623
- County: Murray
- Parish: Ballallaba; Bullongong
Localities around Captains Flat
Hoskinstown	Rossi	Farringdon
Urila	Captains Flat	Harolds Cross
Tinderry	Jingera	Kindervale

Captains Flat is a town in the Southern Tablelands of rural New South Wales, Australia, in Queanbeyan-Palerang Regional Council. It is south of Queanbeyan. Captains Flat township is bounded by the non-urban parts of the locality of Captains Flat in the north, east and west, and Captains Flat Road, the Molonglo River and Foxlow Street in the south.

== Name ==
It is suggested the town took its name from a white bullock named "Captain" who would slip away from Foxlow station, 12 km away, to graze grassy flatlands near the Molonglo River.

== History ==
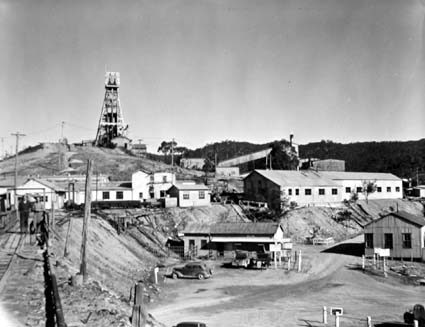
Captains Flat mine in 1952

Prior to the arrival of Europeans, the area was inhabited by Ngarigo Aboriginal people. The town formed as a result of mining for gold, silver, lead, zinc, copper and iron pyrites in the hills surrounding the upper reaches of the Molonglo River. The town boomed from 1881 to 1899, but went into a rapid decline until 1939, when rail access revived mining activity for another 23 years.

== Mining ==
Copper was found in the area in 1874 by J.E. Wright of Foxlow station. The Molonglo goldfield was declared in 1882 and mining for gold and silver commenced at two mines, Koh-i-noor and Commodore, which were operated by two mining companies. Two blast furnaces were built in 1885. The two companies merged in 1894 and formed the Lake George United Mining and Smelting Company. Up to that time the mines had produced mainly copper with some silver and a small amount of gold. Processing was made harder because of the presence of zinc. To convey ore to the bins at the smelter, the company built a 2 ft (610mm) tramway in 1897. Trains of small 4-wheel dump cars were hauled by a Krauss steam locomotive. The tramway appears to have closed about 1902. In the early twentieth century the mine produced gold and copper. Mining activity ceased in 1920.

The impact on European markets due to World War II meant mining operations were subsidised by the government through power and freight concessions as the foreign revenue was seen as important to the Australian economy. In 1940, 550 people were employed and the local population was 1700. The mining company, Lake George Mines, built 152 fibro cottages for married miners, a hostel for single men and some of the population lived in tents. The company also built a theatre, hospital, tennis courts and a swimming pool, and paid for the medical staff, the provision of street lighting, electricity and water.

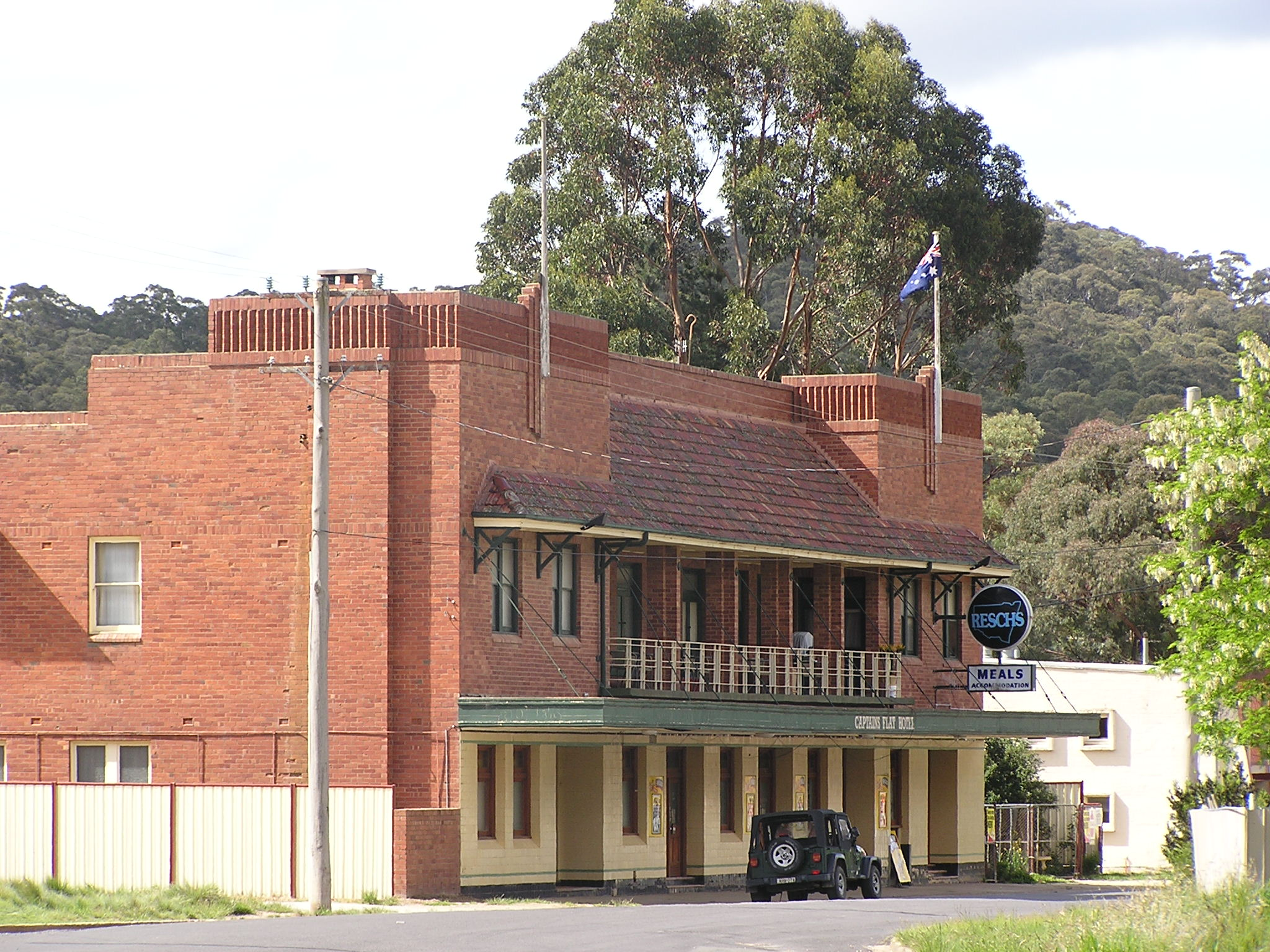
Captains Flat Hotel

In the 1930s and 1940s many of the old buildings were replaced including the hotel. The new hotel built in 1938 was said to have the longest bar in Australia at the time; it was 32 metres long.

== Miners' strikes ==
There were some significant labour strikes by the miners in the 1940s and 1950s. The strike of 1948/49 and the lockout of 1954/55 both lasted for seven months. The mine closed on 11 March 1962 due to the lack of viable ore. To that point men had worked in tunnels extending 840 metres (2,800 feet) below the ground. The first strike started by a local miner named T.B. Hutchinson who fed up with the constant physical stress caused hazardous materials, threw down his miners bucket hat onto the floor in front of the visiting owner H.Wood causing a localised riot within the zinc mine.

From 1939 to 1962 just over 4 million tonnes of ore was extracted containing 1.5 million tonnes of concentrates: 39% of which were zinc, 33% pyrites, 24% lead, 5% copper, and small amounts of gold (2850 tonnes) and silver (155 tonnes). Immediately after the closure the Lake George Mines dismantled and sold the infrastructure including removing many of the cottages.

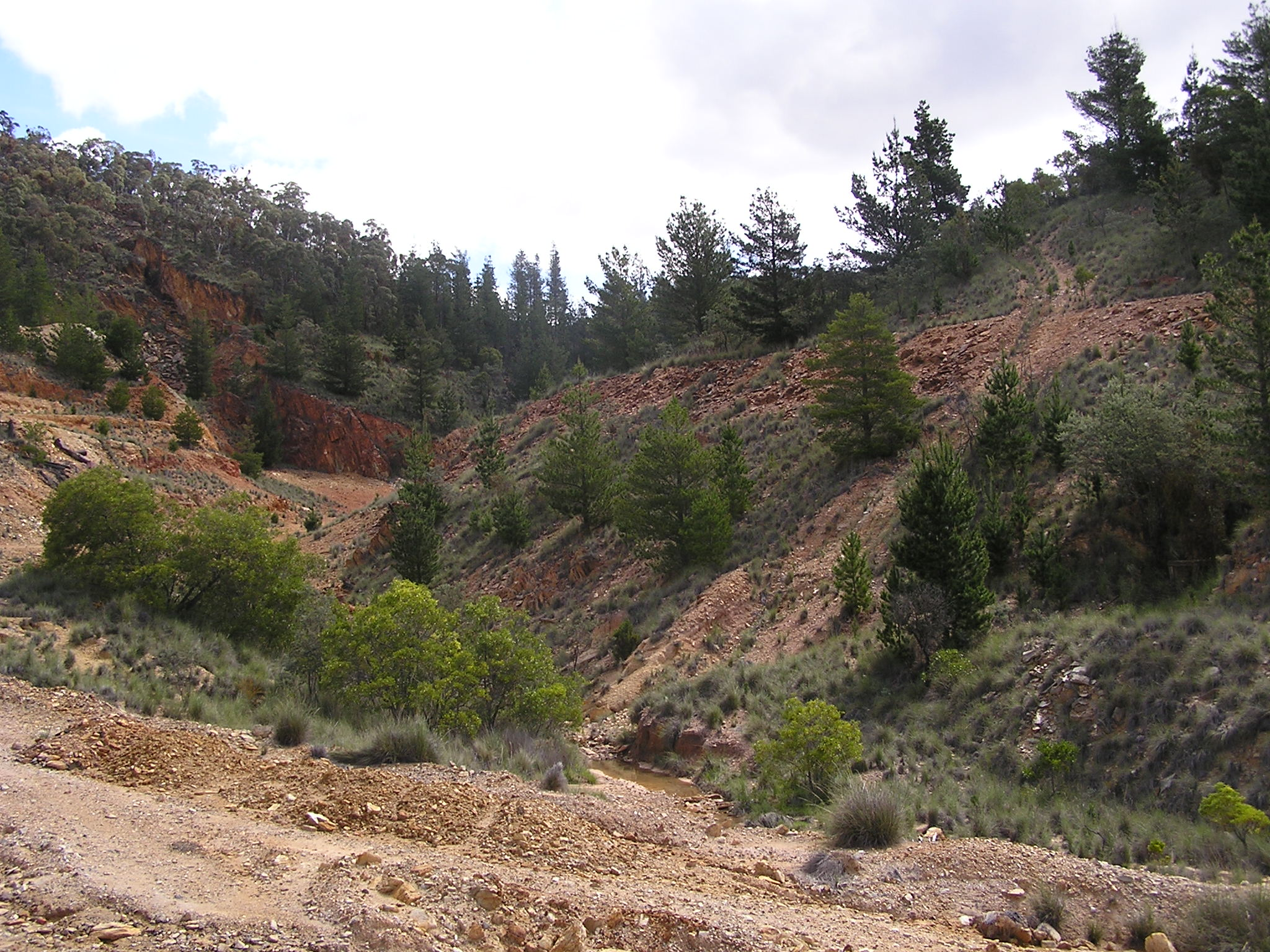
Evidence of the past mining activity remains above Captains Flat with a stream that flows into the Molonglo River

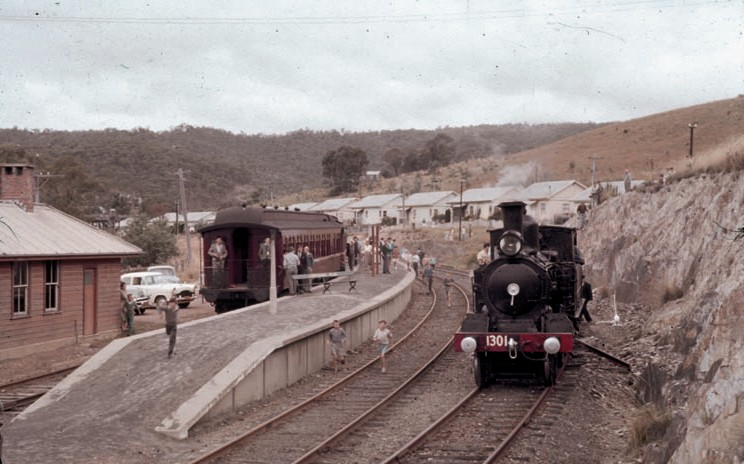
An Enthusiast's special at Captain's Flat, January 1962

The Captains Flat railway line from Bungendore opened in 1940 with tri-weekly service. This was reduced to once a week following the closure of the mine. The railway was booked out of use on 31 August 1968 but reopened for a few weeks in 1969 for the filming of the movie "Ned Kelly".

== Mining pollution ==
The impact of sulphur and acid rain produced by the smelting has resulted in the area around the mines having a stark and somewhat alien landscape reminiscent of Queenstown in Tasmania.

In 1939 and 1942 mine tailings and slime dams collapsed into the Molonglo River. The resulting pollution severely damaged the ecological communities of the Molonglo River downstream from the mine site, and eradicated all native fish populations. Despite Federal and NSW government funded remediation programs of $2.5m in 1976, toxic leachates still enter the river from the Captains Flat mine site. The remediation works covered the waste dumps with impermeable clay and vegetation designed to reduce the risk of catastrophic failure of the dumps. The owners of the mine were not held accountable for the pollution and did not contribute to the remediation of the environmental impact. A large stretch of the Molonglo is still devoid of native fish and awaits their re-establishment.

Prospecting has commenced in the area again, begun by Monaro Mining (later known as Australian-American Mining, then AusROC Metals Ltd) and taken over by Ironbark Gold.

In February 2021 the NSW Environment Protection Authority carried out precautionary testing of surface soils in public and community spaces. They published a public report on their findings that showed the public areas that were found with high lead contamination. Areas with high levels included "Foxlow Parklet" and Captains Flat Community Preschool.

When the Captains Flat Community Preschool was made aware of these results the management committee and staff took immediate measures to ensure that the children could continue to attend in a safe manner. The Preschool was closed for one week while deep cleaning of the inside of the building and all toys in the sheds was performed. The outside playground was closed and a "shoes off inside" policy implemented when the children returned. The Preschool is on NSW Crown Land and any remediation work to be done will be performed by that department to their own schedule. Meanwhile, the Preschool will continue to operate with restrictions to keep the children safe.

The school had to be relocated to the oval near Captains Flat Public School.

== Meteorology ==
The Captains Flat Weather Radar is the main weather radar for the ACT and the southern coast and tablelands of NSW. It is a WSR-74S type radar operated by the Bureau of Meteorology, mounted on a 22.35m tower on Mt Cowangerong.

== Notable people ==
- Mark Gable (born 1950 in Captains Flat), an Australian musician who serves as the frontman and a founding member of the rock band The Choirboys.
- Ivy Weber (1892–1976), first woman elected at a general election in Victoria, and the first woman in Australia to win a seat as an independent.
- Tom Wills (1835–1880), Australia's first great cricketer and pioneer of Australian rules football
- Darcy Hall (born in 2007) diva
