= Taemas Bridge =

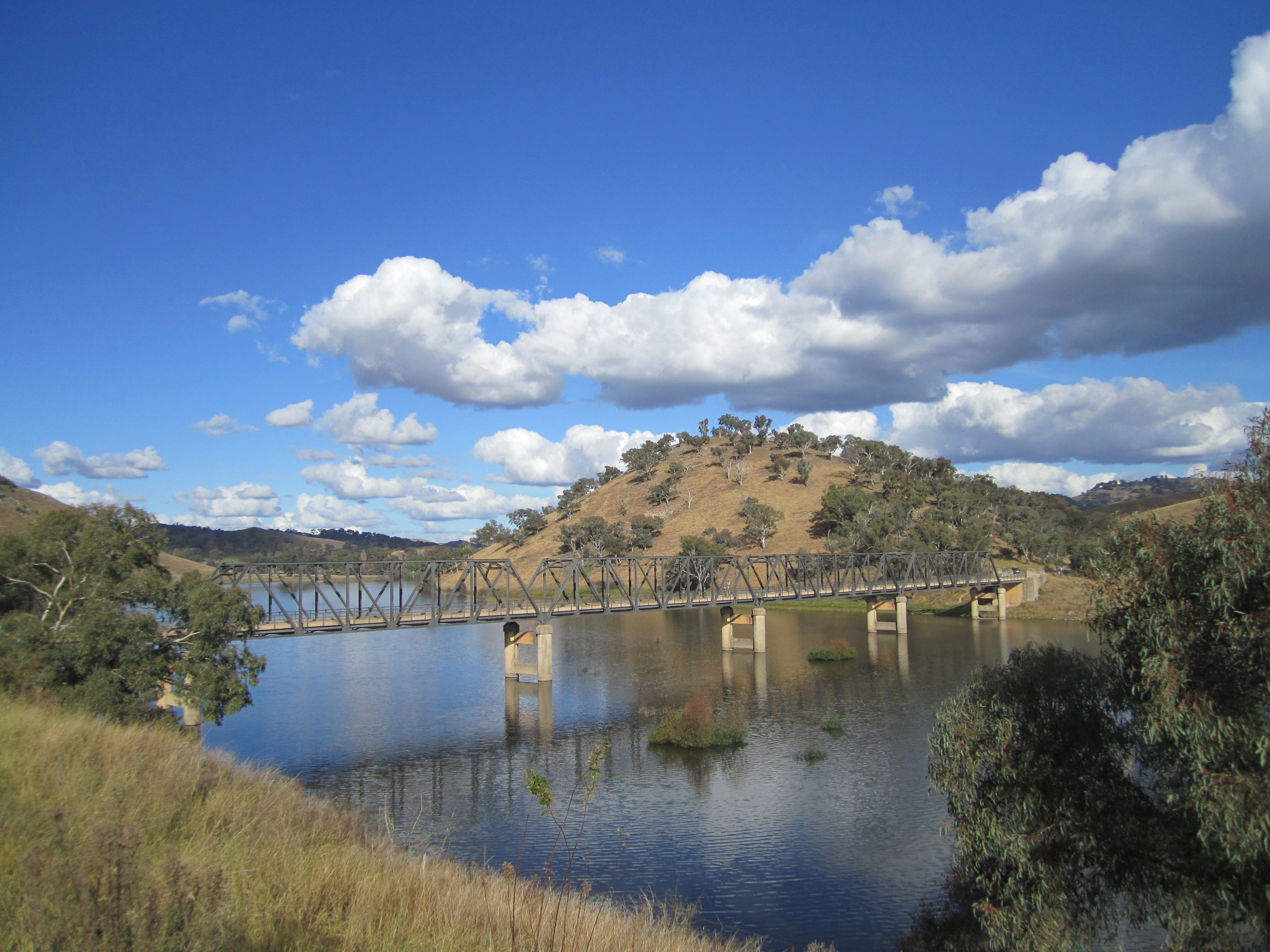
- Coordinates: 35°00′12″S 148°50′53″E
- Carries: Wee Jasper Road: Motor vehicles only
- Crosses: Murrumbidgee River
- Locale: near Wee Jasper, Yass Valley Council, New South Wales, Australia
- Begins: Taemas
- Ends: Cavan, New South Wales
- Official name: Taemas Bridge over Murrumbidgee River
- Other name: RTA Bridge No. 6629
- Owner: Transport for NSW

Characteristics
- Design: Truss
- Material: Steel
- Trough construction: Reinforced concrete
- Pier construction: Concrete
- Total length: 200 metres (660 ft)
- Width: 5.5 metres (18 ft)
- Longest span: 45.7 metres (150 ft)
- No. of spans: 4 main, 2 approaches
- No. of lanes: Two

History
- Constructed by: Tulloch Ironworks; Monier Pipe and Reinforced Concrete Works
- Fabrication by: Dorman Long & Co
- Construction cost: A£60,895
- Opened: 1931
- Closed: Taemas Bridge (1888-1925) (MacDonald truss); Temporary punt (1925-1929); Low-level bridge (1929); Temporary punt (1929-1931)

New South Wales Heritage Register
- Official name: Taemas Bridge over Murrumbidgee River; RTA Bridge No. 6629
- Type: State agency heritage (built)
- Criteria: a., c., d., g.
- Designated: 18 August 2005
- Reference no.: Heritage Act, 1977 (NSW) s 170
- Type: Road Bridge
- Category: Transport - Land
- Builders: Tulloch Ironworks; Monier Pipe and Reinforced Concrete Works

Location
- Interactive map of Taemas Bridge

The Taemas Bridge is a two-lane road bridge that carries the Wee Jasper Road across the Murrumbidgee River, at the settlement of Taemas, near Wee Jasper in the Yass Valley Council local government area of New South Wales, Australia. The bridge crosses on the river just before it enters Lake Burrinjuck, which has been created by the Burrinjuck Dam. The bridge is a key part of the road between Yass and Wee Jasper, and from there, to Tumut. The bridge is located approximately 26 kilometres (16 mi) from Yass and 22 kilometres (14 mi) from Wee Jasper. The property is owned by Transport for NSW. Under the Heritage Act, 1977 (NSW) s 170, the bridge was added to the New South Wales State agency heritage register on 18 August 2005.

== History ==
A metal MacDonald truss bridge, also known as the Taemas Bridge, was built c. 1888, located 3 kilometres (2 mi) downriver from the existing Taemas Bridge. In c. 1924 this bridge was raised 5 metres (15 ft) and extended to 270 metres (885 ft) with the addition of numerous timber approach spans by the Water Conservation and Irrigation Commission in association with the construction of Burrinjuck Dam. This bridge was destroyed by a flood in May 1925. The local member of the NSW Parliament, Jack Tully, promised to have the destroyed Taemas Bridge replaced as soon as possible.

In the interim, the NSW Public Works Department (PWD) established a punt service adjacent to the destroyed bridge until such time as a new bridge could be constructed. The punt remained in operation for almost four years later, until it was swept away in April 1929. A low-level bridge was constructed in 1929, but the water rose and destroyed it that same year. In July 1929, another punt was then established to provide alternative access, and was worked hard carrying wool and other produce.

== Description ==
The site of the current Taemas Bridge was selected by the Public Works Department and is located approximately 3 kilometres (2 mi) upriver from the former bridge site. This led to a longer road route, yet enabled a shorter bridge to be constructed in a location were flood levels were expected to be lower. The current bridge was completed in 1931 and is over 200 metres (660 ft) long.

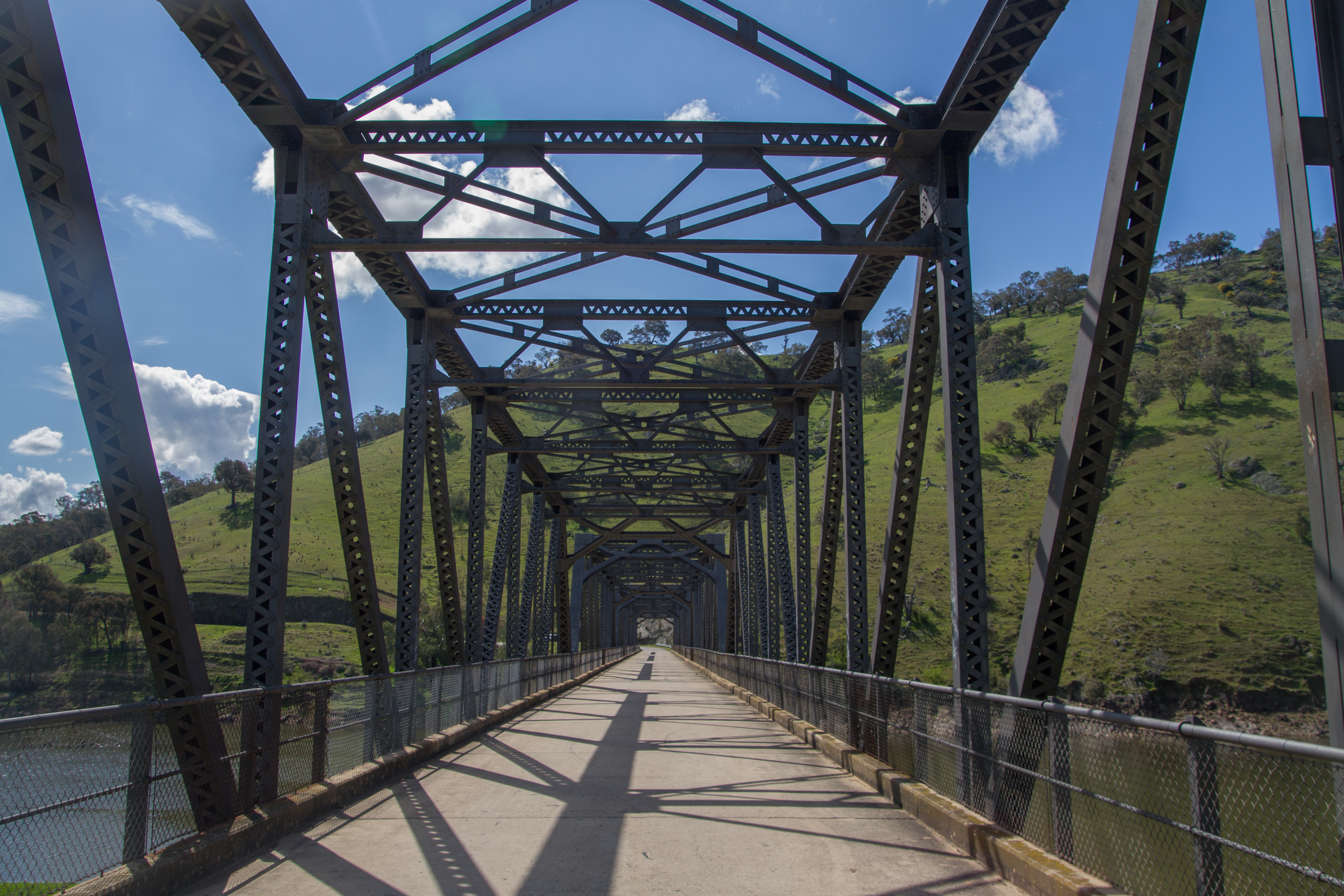
The centre of the bridge

After several years of inaction, the Goodradigbee and Yass councils organised a protest meeting, and the NSW Government asked Tulloch's Phoenix Ironworks in Sydney to order steel for the bridge. Steel members show rolling marks of Dorman Long & Co, so were presumably imported from Middlesbrough, England. Monier Pipe and Reinforced Concrete Works constructed piers and installed the bridge. Once constructed, Gilroy and Robson Ltd gravelled the bridge approaches ready for opening.

This two-lane steel through truss bridge spans the Murrumbidgee River in the upper reaches of the Burrinjuck Dam storage. Its height has been set to clear the large floods to which the valley is subjected (and which destroyed its predecessor).

The bridge has four main spans and two approach spans. Approach spans are supported by six 13.7-metre (45 ft) longitudinal steel beams (or stringers) which in turn support a reinforced concrete deck. There are cross girders at midspan to stabilise the beams. The main spans are 45.7 metres (150 ft), having eight bays in a Pratt truss configuration. Connections are by riveting, and the trusses make extensive use of lattice bracing to produce compound members. Tension members are stabilised by riveted Vierendeel plates.

The comparatively narrow 5.5-metre (18 ft) deck of the bridge is unsurfaced concrete, edged by kerbs with pipe handrails with infill wire netting.

The substantial piers have two cylindrical legs founded on rock with up to three lateral tie beams. The lower sections bell out to larger diameter below the bottom cross beam. Above the upper cross beam the columns are capped with octagonal capitals which support the bridge bearings which are of rocker type.

Monumental style is used in the abutments which are of U shape, but with bold corners capped with imposing endposts. The side faces of the abutment and endposts are inclined.

The bridge was opened in 1931 and cost A£60,895. Even after the new bridge was opened some locals still forded the river near the former bridge if they could, to save petrol from the extra distance required by road to reach the new bridge. There is a carpark at the southern end of the bridge, from which the Murrumbidgee River can be accessed.

== Heritage listing ==
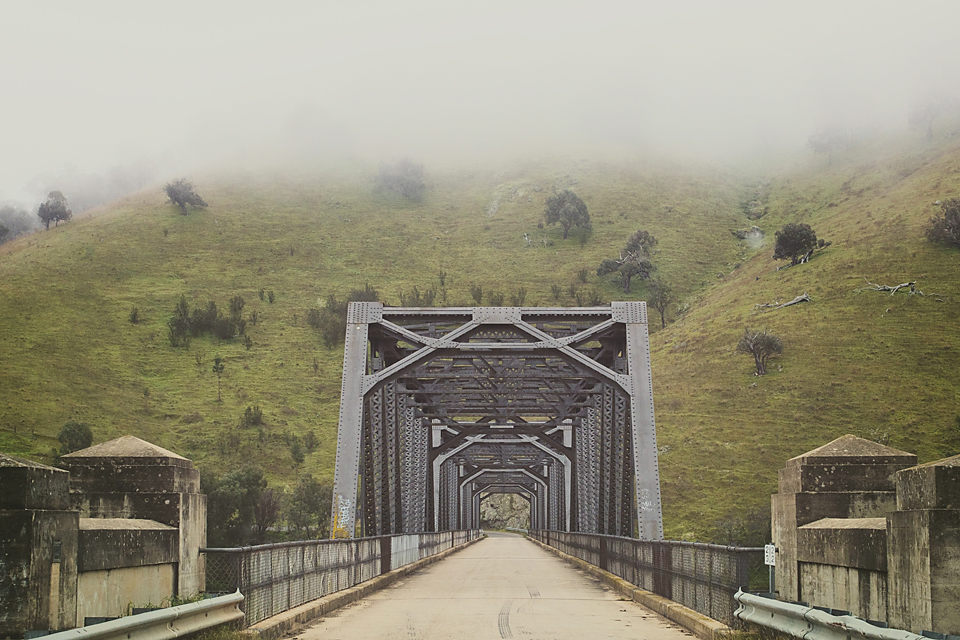
The southern end of the bridge

The Taemas Bridge has historical, social, technical, aesthetic and representative significance within the Yass-Tumut-Yarrowlumla-Gundagai area. It has provided a crossing of a major waterway, the Murrumbidgee River, for over seventy years and its long term reliability has facilitated the agricultural activities and economies of the surrounding areas. The history of transport in the region has been shaped by the Murrumbidgee and the difficulty of providing crossings of this large and flood prone waterway. The bridge represents a significant technical achievement, its robust design and its positioning, with the site of the former crossing downstream and documentary sources, demonstrate the intelligence, effort and investment required to construct a lasting and reliable crossing of this major and dynamic waterway. The bridge is of aesthetic significance, being an impressive structure of considerable length crossing a major waterway and having landmark qualities on the Yass-Tumut road. The monumental style of the abutments reflects the importance ascribed to the crossing by the Public Works Department and the community. The bridge has local social significance. The loss of the previous bridge in record flood was a major blow to the local community using this important transport and communication route. The community was involved in the debate surrounding the siting of the existing bridge, and continued to express dismay at the lengthy delay in its construction. The bridge is a landmark to which local travellers are likely to attach a sense of place and self. The bridge is a good, intact example of large scale truss design in the early to mid twentieth century.

Taemas Bridge over Murrumbidgee River was listed on the New South Wales State agency heritage register on 18 August 2005 having satisfied the following criteria.

The place is important in demonstrating the course, or pattern, of cultural or natural history in New South Wales.

Taemas Bridge is historically significant as an important transport link in the State's south west. It has provided a reliable crossing of a major waterway, the Murrumbidgee River, between the districts of Yass and Tumut for over seventy years. The history of transport in the region has been shaped by the Murrumbidgee and the difficulty of providing crossings of this large and flood prone waterway. The story of the Taemas Bridge, a long-awaited replacement of an equally ambitious bridge washed away in flood, is articulate about the interaction between the communities of the Yass-Tumut area and their environment and also about the efforts and strategies of the government in providing reliable access on important rural transport routes in NSW. The long term reliability of the Taemas bridge has facilitated the agricultural activities and economies of the surrounding areas.

The place is important in demonstrating aesthetic characteristics and/or a high degree of creative or technical achievement in New South Wales.

The Taemas Bridge represents a significant technical achievement. The design of this robust metal bridge and its positioning, with the site of the former crossing downstream and documentary sources, demonstrate the intelligence, effort and investment required to construct a lasting and reliable crossing of this major and dynamic waterway. The bridge is of aesthetic significance, being an impressive structure of considerable length crossing a major waterway and having landmark qualities on the Yass-Tumut road. The monumental style of the abutments reflects the importance ascribed to the crossing by the Public Works Department and the community.

The place has a strong or special association with a particular community or cultural group in New South Wales for social, cultural or spiritual reasons.

The bridge has local social significance. The loss of the previous bridge in record flood was a major blow to the local community using this important transport and communication route. The community was involved in the debate surrounding the siting of the existing bridge, and continued to express dismay at the lengthy delay in its construction. The monumental style of the abutments would seem to reflect the importance ascribed to the crossing by the Public Works Department and the community. The bridge is a landmark to which local travellers are likely to attach a sense of place and self.

The place possesses uncommon, rare or endangered aspects of the cultural or natural history of New South Wales.

The bridge is a good, intact example of large scale truss design in the heyday of the rivet.

== See also ==
- Goodradigbee River Bridge
- List of bridges in Australia
