= Burrinjuck =

Burrinjuck may refer to:

- Electoral district of Burrinjuck, New South Wales, Australia;
- Burrinjuck Dam which holds Burrinjuck Lake;
- Burrinjuck village
