= Greater Burrinjuck Dam Site =

Greater Burrinjuck Dam
- Location within New South Wales Location within Australia
- 34.9879°S 148.6323°E
- Location: Burrinjuck, Yass Valley Shire, New South Wales, Australia

Site notes
- Owner: Department of Planning and Infrastructure

New South Wales Heritage Register
- Official name: Burrinjuck Dam Site (Greater); Burrinjuck Dam Site; Barren Jack Barrenjack
- Type: state heritage (complex / group)
- Designated: 2 April 1999
- Reference no.: 959
- Type: Water Supply Reservoir/ Dam
- Category: Utilities - Water

Greater Burrinjuck Dam Site is a heritage-listed dam surrounds at Burrinjuck, Yass Valley Shire, New South Wales, Australia. It is also known as Burrinjuck Dam Site and Barren Jack or Barrenjack. The property is owned by Department of Planning and Infrastructure (State Government). It was added to the New South Wales State Heritage Register on 2 April 1999.

== History ==
The word "Burrinjuck" is a corruption of the Aboriginal word "Booren Yiack" which is the name of the precipitous mountain overlooking the dam site. Initially translated to "Barren Jack", the name was changed c.1910 to "Burrinjuck" as the Government considered the new name to be more in keeping for the promotion of the new Murrumbidgee Irrigation Area development and to encourage new immigrants to take up settlement there. Burrinjuck City, a temporary township, was established to house workers during the construction of Burrinjuck Dam. Later, the buildings on river flats, the original access road to the town and works, old sand haulage railway, etc. were inundated by the rising storage of the dam. Presently, many of the early structures and artefacts still remain on the Burrinjuck Dam site, both above and under water. Some of the structures that remain above water include some staff cottages, a church owned by Church of England, the children's graveyard site (early burial ground of some workers' children), Lake de Burgh dam (owned by State Rail?), the Barren Jack Creek Water Supply Dam, etc. The site also contains many rare species of native flora and fauna.

== Description ==
The greater Burrinjuck Dam site is about 60 km by road from Yass in southern NSW, and covers an area of some 500sq. Miles. The site contains many rare species of flora and fauna. Apart from the Burrinjuck Dam and related structures, the site also contains many structures and artefacts, both above a nd under water, which are associated with the early construction phases of Burrinjuck Dam. These include railway remnants, Lake de Burgh locomotive water supply dam, Barren Jack Water Supply Dam, the children's graveyard, the quarry site, the Office and Conference Centre, a number of staff cottages, a church, etc.

The children's graveyard site is accessible through dense shrubs. The site is identified by wire fencing although the cutrilage is unclear. The ground within the fence is generally clear of shrubs and have clumps of daffodils planted at various spots. The daffodils are said to mark the spots of burial. Outside the fencing, the grounds contain evidence of stone terraces.

The curtilage for the Greater Burrinjuck Dam Site includes Burrinjuck Village, the visual catchment of the Burrinjuck village precinct and the visual catchment of the dam wall and its environs.

=== Further information ===
Preparation of a Conservation Management Plan and a detailed archaeological study incorporating the whole site are highly recommended.

== Heritage listing ==
The Burrinjuck Dam site is significant for its natural and cultural resources. It is the site of the first irrigation water storage in New South wales. It contains many rare species of native flora and fauna, as well as many structures an artifacts (both above and under water) associated with the construction of the Burrinjuck Dam. The site contains European archaeological sites, and probably Aboriginal sites.

Greater Burrinjuck Dam was listed on the New South Wales State Heritage Register on 2 April 1999.

== See also ==
- Burrinjuck Dam
