= Good Hope, New South Wales =

Good Hope
- Suburb
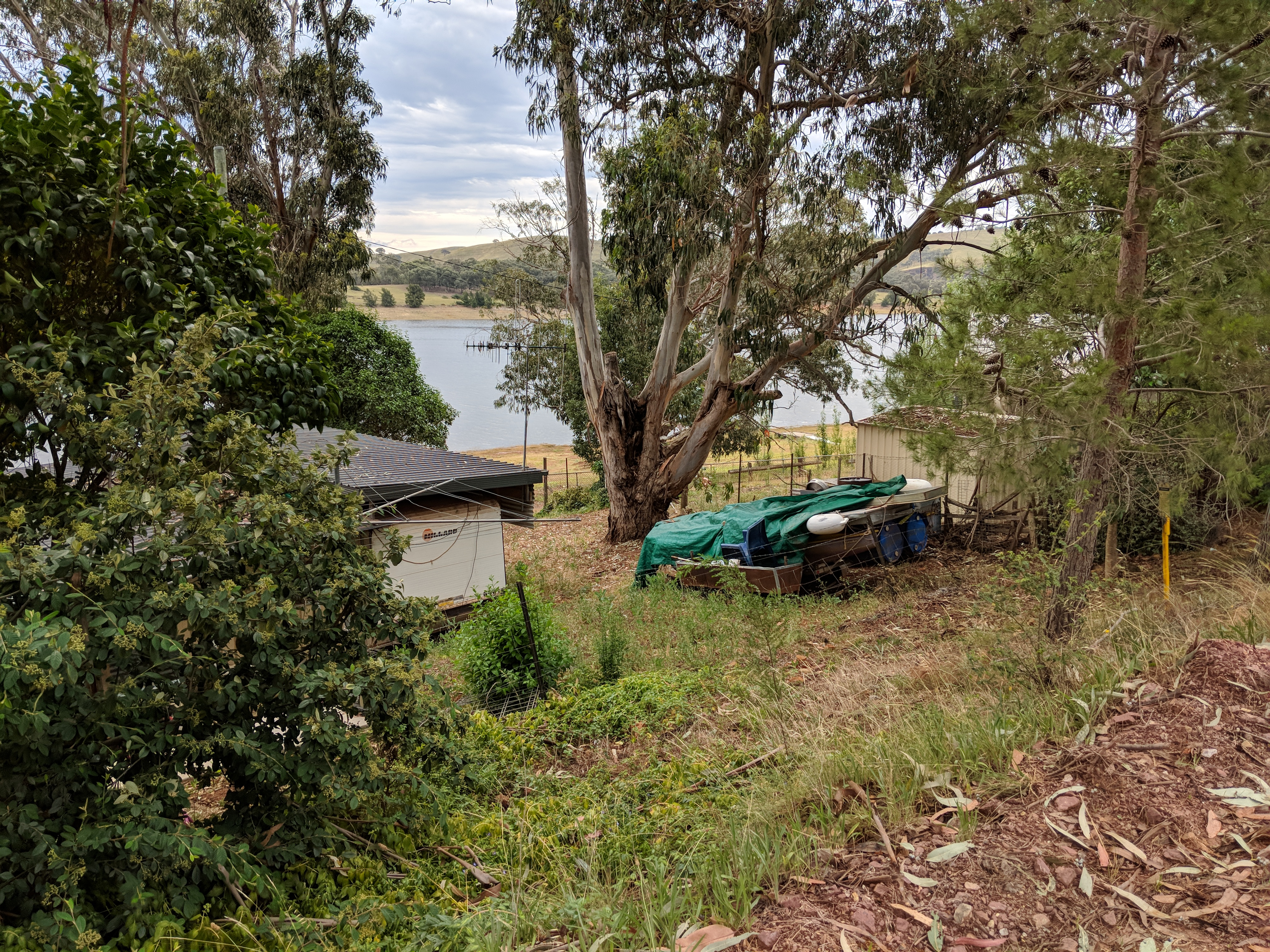

- Coordinates: 34°53′14″S 148°49′50″E
- Country: Australia
- State: New South Wales
- LGA: Yass Valley Council
- Location: 66 km (41 mi) NW of Canberra; 13 km (8.1 mi) SW of Yass; 284 km (176 mi) SW of Sydney

Government
  - State electorate: Goulburn
  - Federal division: Riverina
- Elevation: 577 m (1,893 ft)

Population
  - Total: 165 (2016 census)
- Postcode: 2582
- County: Murray
Suburbs around Good Hope
Bowning	Yass	Yass
Woolgarlo	Good Hope	Marchmont
Narrangullen	Cavan	Boambolo

Good Hope is a locality in the Southern Tablelands of New South Wales, Australia in the Yass Valley Shire. It lies south-west of Yass on the northern side of Lake Burrinjuck on the Murrumbidgee River and south of the Yass River. At the 2016 census, it had a population of 165.
