= Boambolo =

- Town
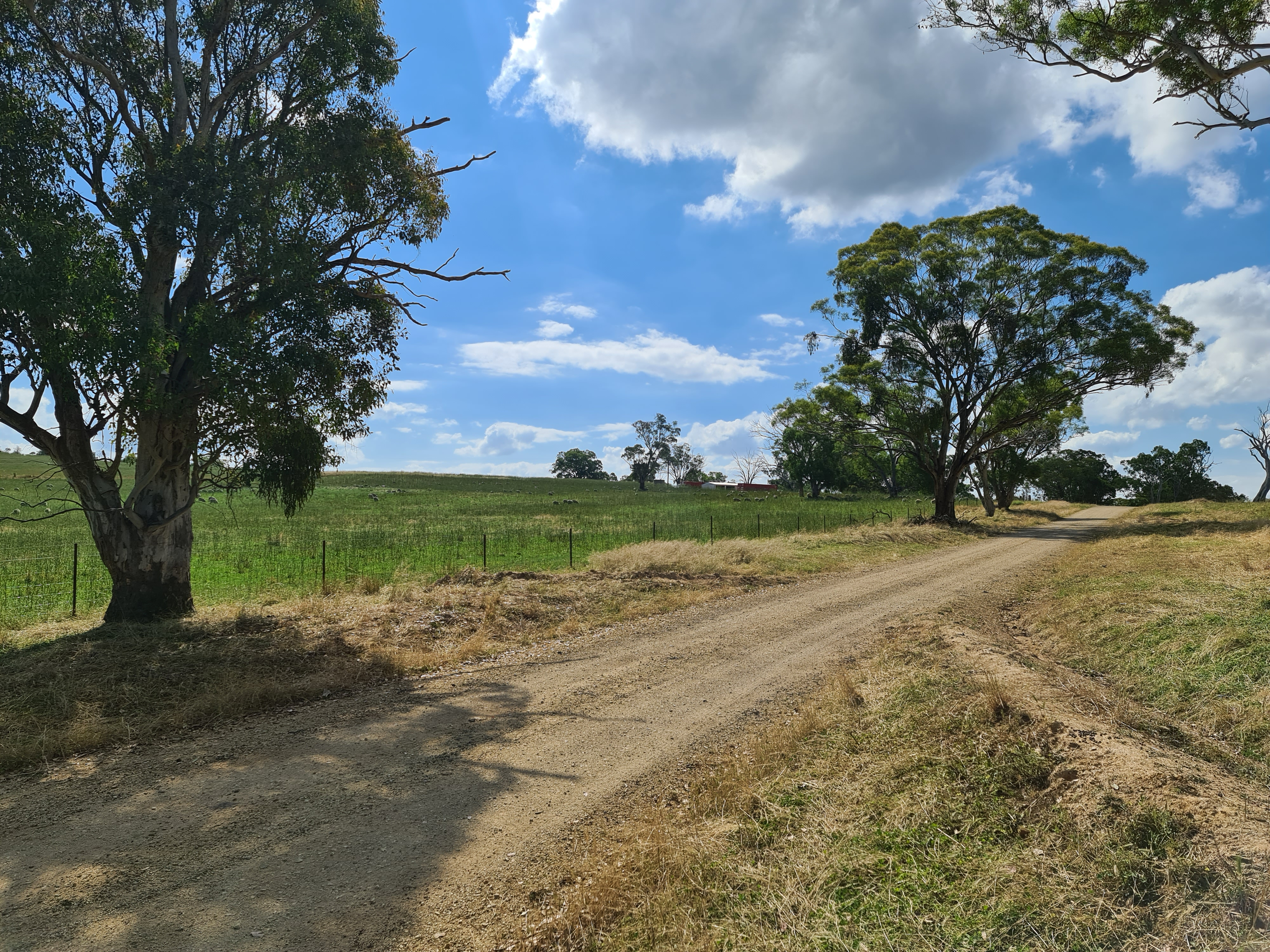

- Coordinates: 34°58′12″S 148°54′7″E
- Country: Australia
- State: New South Wales
- Region: Southern Tablelands
- LGA: Yass Valley Council
- Location: 15 km (9.3 mi) S of Yass, New South Wales; 55 km (34 mi) NW of Canberra

Government
  - State electorate: Goulburn
  - Federal division: Riverina

Population
  - Total: 79 (SAL 2021)
- Postcode: 2582
- County: Murray
- Parish: Boambolo
Localities around Boambolo
	Yass	Marchmont
Good Hope	Boambolo	Murrumbateman
	Cavan	Jeir

Boambolo is a locality in the Yass Valley Council, New South Wales, Australia. It is on the Yass–Wee Jasper road about 15 km south of Yass. At the 2016 census, it had a population of 53.
