= Narrangullen =

- Town
- Coordinates: 35°00′49″S 148°44′15″E
- Country: Australia
- State: New South Wales
- Region: Southern Tablelands
- LGA: Yass Valley Council
- Location: 44 km (27 mi) SW of Yass, New South Wales; 58 km (36 mi) NW of Canberra

Government
  - State electorate: Goulburn
  - Federal division: Riverina

Population
  - Total: 9 (SAL 2021)
- Postcode: 2582
- County: Cowley
- Parish: Narrangullen
Localities around Narrangullen
Burrinjuck	Woolgarlo	Good Hope
Wee Jasper	Narrangullen	Cavan
Wee Jasper	Wee Jasper	Mullion

Narrangullen, New South Wales is a rural locality of Yass Valley Council on the south side of Lake Burrinjuck on the road between Yass and Wee Jasper, about 60 km northwest of Canberra. At the 2016 census, it had a population of 27. Narrangullen had a "provisional" school in 1943.
