= Woolgarlo =

Woolgarlo New South Wales
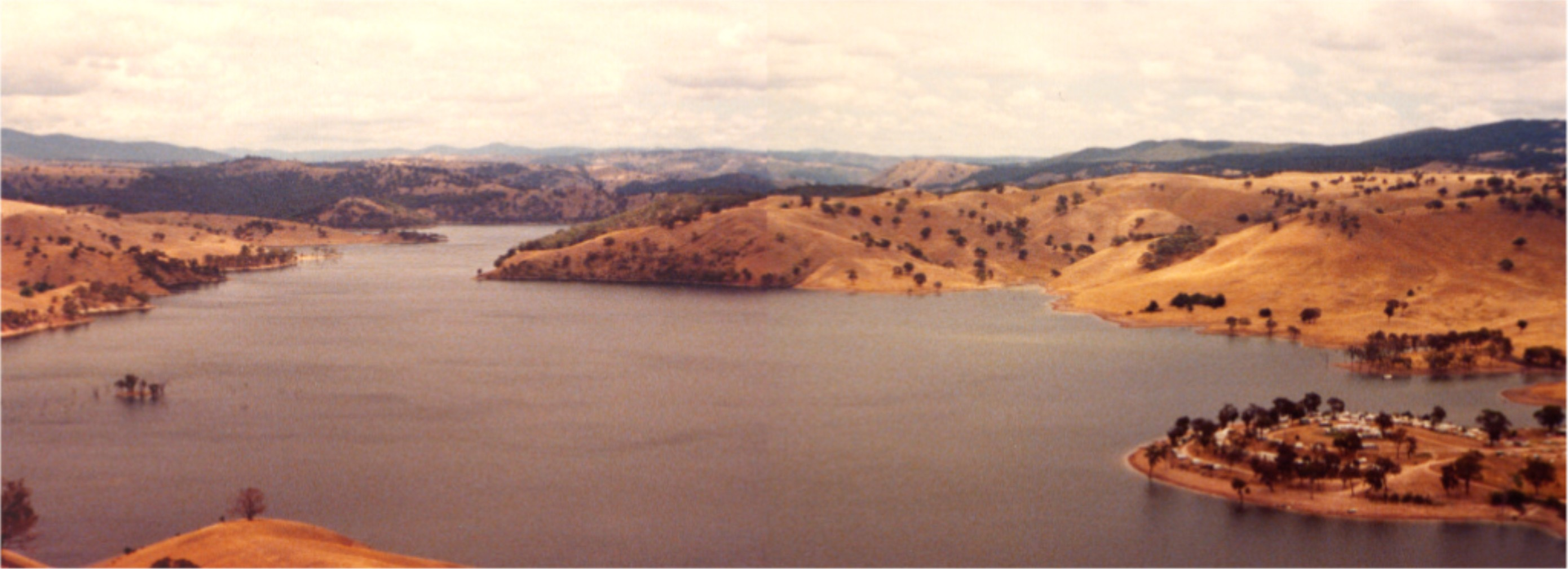
- Woolgarlo

- Coordinates: 34°53′24″S 148°44′24″E
- Population: 42 (SAL 2021)
- Postcode(s): 2582
- Location: 15 km (9 mi) from Burrinjuck; 17 km (11 mi) from Bookham
- LGA(s): Yass Valley Council
- County: Harden
- Parish: Woolgarlo
- State electorate(s): Goulburn
- Federal division(s): Riverina
Localities around Woolgarlo:
Bookham	Bookham	Bowning
Bookham	Woolgarlo	Good Hope
Burrinjuck	Narrangullen	Good Hope

Woolgarlo is a locality on the foreshores of the Yass River arm of Lake Burrinjuck, in the far eastern part of the Riverina in the Yass Valley Shire of New South Wales, Australia. At the 2016 census, it had a population of 26.

== Location and features ==
It is situated by road, about 15 kilometres (9.3 mi) north east from Burrinjuck and 17 kilometres (11 mi) south east from Bookham.

The property was converted into a caravan and camping park during the 1960s, catering mainly to freshwater anglers and waterskiers. The caravan park was renamed Lake Burrinjuck Leisure Resort during the 1980s, but continues to be known as Woolgarlo among locals.

A Woolgarlo Post Office opened on 1 May 1870 but was closed in 1872.
