= Cavan, New South Wales =

Cavan
- Town
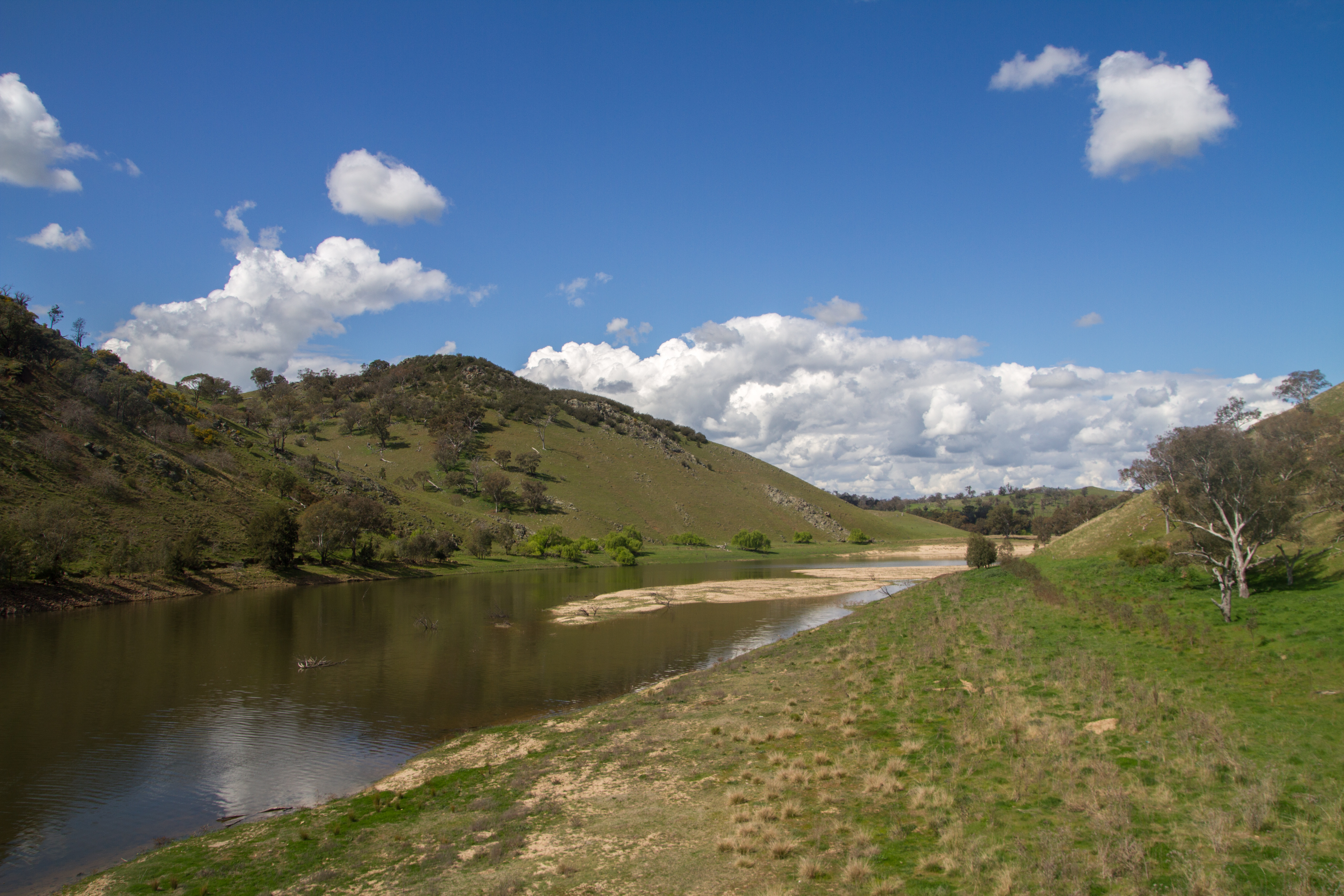
- Wee Jasper Road in Cavan

- Coordinates: 35°01′S 148°50′E
- Country: Australia
- State: New South Wales
- LGA: Yass Valley Shire
- Location: 304 km (189 mi) SW of Sydney; 43 km (27 mi) NW of Canberra; 30 km (19 mi) S of Yass; 40 km (25 mi) NE of Wee Jasper

Government
  - State electorate: Goulburn
  - Federal division: Riverina
- Elevation: 381 m (1,250 ft)

Population
  - Total: 47 (2016 census)
- Postcode: 2582
- County: Cowley
Localities around Cavan
Good Hope	Good Hope	Boambolo
Narrangullen	Cavan	Jeir
Narrangullen	Mullion	Mullion

Cavan (/keɪvən/ KAY-vən) is a rural community situated on the south bank of the Murrumbidgee River in the Yass Valley Shire. At the 2016 census, it had a population of 47. It is situated by road, about 40 kilometres southwest of Yass and 43 northwest of Canberra. It was named after the town of Cavan in Ireland. It is reportedly owned by Rupert Murdoch.

Cavan Post Office opened on 1 March 1887, closed in 1902, reopened in 1913 and closed in 1951.
