= Childowla, New South Wales =

Civil parish of Buccleuch County, New South Wales

Coordinates: 34°59′57″S 148°30′02″E

Childowla, New South Wales is a civil parish of Buccleuch County, New South Wales.

The only town of the parish is Burrinjuck village on the Murrumbidgee River.
