= Burrinjuck Power Station =

Hydroelectric power station in New South Wales, Australia

Coordinates: 35°00′04″S 148°34′58″E

Burrinjuck Power Station is a hydroelectric power station at Burrinjuck Dam, New South Wales, Australia. Burrinjuck has three turbines with a total generating capacity of 28 megawatts (38,000 hp) of electricity.

The power station was commenced in 1927, running two 5 megawatts (6,700 hp) turbines. In 1938, an additional two 5 MW turbines were added at the dam wall. In 1972, floods damaged the original two turbines, which were decommissioned. In 2017, the remaining two turbines were each upgraded to 6 megawatts (8,000 hp), and an additional turbine of 16 megawatts (21,000 hp) was added.
