= Mullion, New South Wales =

Mullion
- Suburb
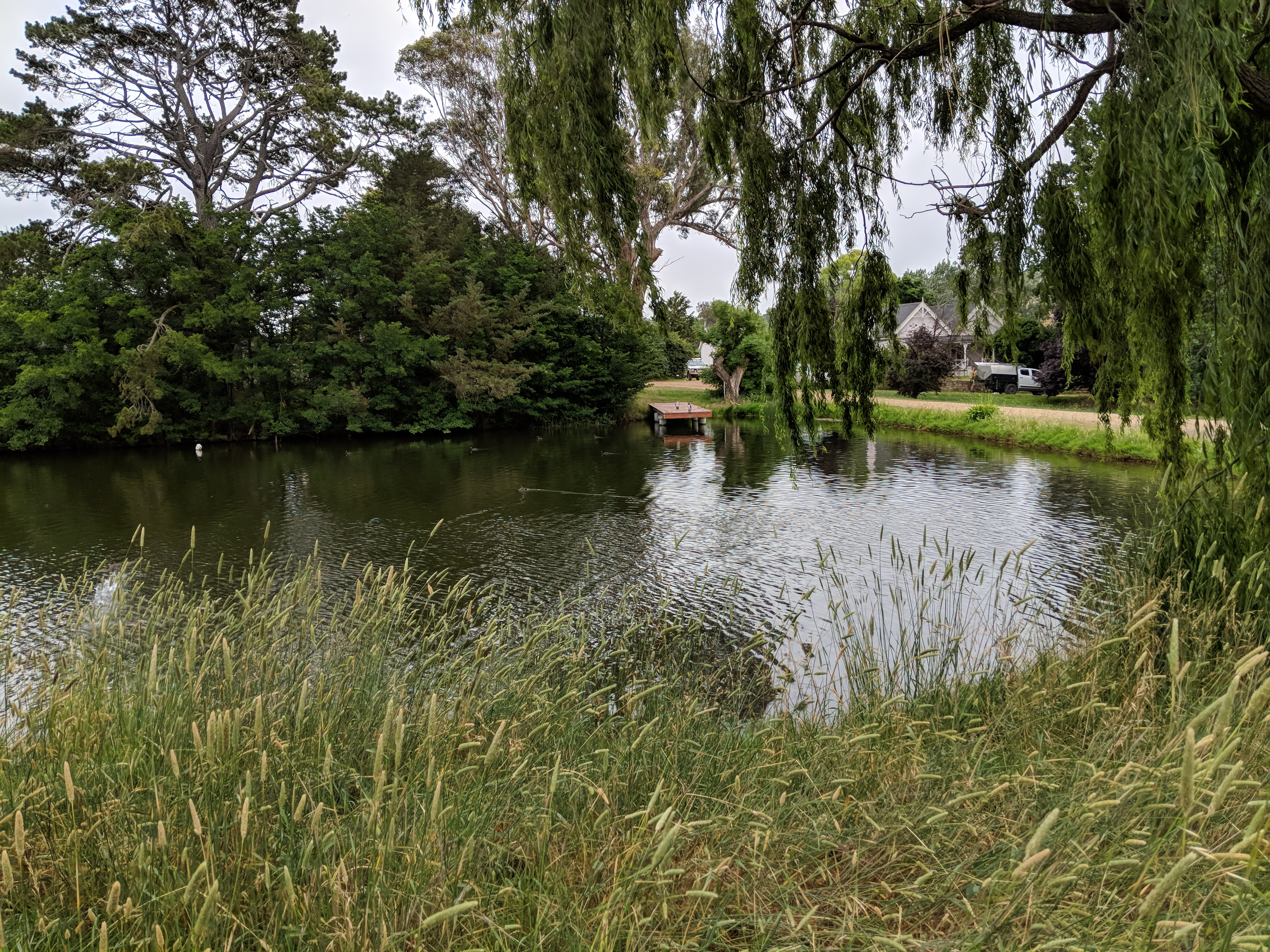

- Coordinates: 35°08′10″S 148°53′07″E
- Country: Australia
- State: New South Wales
- LGA: Yass Valley Council
- Location: 40 km (25 mi) NW of Canberra; 45 km (28 mi) S of Yass

Government
  - State electorate: Goulburn
  - Federal division: Eden-Monaro

Population
  - Total: 89 (SAL 2021)
- Postcode: 2582
- County: Cowley
- Parish: Umburra; Mullion
Suburbs around Mullion
Narrangullen	Cavan	Jeir
Wee Jasper	Mullion	Wallaroo
Uriarra	Uriarra	Parkwood

Mullion is a locality in the Southern Tablelands of New South Wales, Australia in Yass Valley Shire. It lies north-west of Canberra on the western side of the Murrumbidgee River. At the 2016 census, it had a population of 84. It had a public school from 1959 to 1972. The locality is located in the Umburra parish of Cowley County, with a small part of it in Mullion parish, which lies further west.
