= Barren Jack Creek Water Supply Dam =

- Location within New South Wales
- 35.0017°S 148.5842°E
- Location: Burrinjuck, Yass Valley Shire, New South Wales, Australia

History
- Built: 1908–1908

Site notes
- Owner: Department of Planning and Infrastructure

New South Wales Heritage Register
- Official name: Burrinjuck Dam Site - Barren Jack Creek Water Supply Dam
- Type: state heritage (complex / group)
- Designated: 2 April 1999
- Reference no.: 960
- Type: Water Supply Reservoir/ Dam
- Category: Utilities - Water
- Builders: Department of Public Works

Barren Jack Creek Water Supply Dam is a heritage-listed dam at Burrinjuck, in the Southern Tablelands region of New South Wales, Australia. It was built in 1908 by the New South Wales Department of Public Works. The property is owned by Department of Planning and Infrastructure (State Government). It was added to the New South Wales State Heritage Register on 2 April 1999.

== History ==
The Barren Jack Creek Water Supply Dam is a minor dam built to provide water supply by gravitation to the temporary settlement of Barren Jack City on a flat adjacent to the river. The settlement of Barren Jack City (later renamed Burrinjuck City) was established by New South Wales Department of Public Works to house the employees and workers engaged during the construction of Burrinjuck Dam, and was estimated to have a population of up to 2,000. Barren Jack Creek Water Supply Dam was completed on 24 December 1908, at a cost of £918/4/6. After the completion of Burrinjuck Dam, the settlement was inundated and the water supply dam ceased to be used. It is now not in use, and as there is no scheduled maintenance program for the structure, it is gradually being silted up.

== Description ==
The Barren Jack Creek Water Supply Dam was built on Barren Jack Creek close to the temporary settlement of Barren Jack City to facilitate supply of water by gravity from the dam to the settlement. The dam comprises a thin-walled cylindrical arch reinforced concrete structure built across the creek, with a capacity of impounding 4.5 million gallons of water for use. The dam has been constructed to a radius of 24.384 m (80.00 ft), 12.801 m (42.00 ft) high. The dam wall is 1.752 m (5 ft 9.0 in)s) thick at the base and is 0.609 m (2.00 ft) thick at the crest. On the right bank, a waste weir 4.572 m (15.00 ft) wide provides for the escape of surplus water. A pair of steel beam supports, being remnants of a standing platform remain at midpoint of the arch wall crest downstream side. Second-hand steel rails were used for reinforcement during the construction of the dam wall (providing about 12.4 kg/m, or 25 lb to the yard) and they appear to have provided adequate supports for the still structurally integral wall.

=== Condition ===
As at 6 December 2000, although the dam has not been used for a long time and appears to have silted up, the dam structure appears to be in good condition.

== Heritage listing ==
The dam is associated with the construction phase of Burrinjuck Dam. It is a significant link to the community and the temporary township (now submerged under water) established by the NSW Department of Public Works during the construction phase of Burrinjuck Dam.

Barren Jack Creek Water Supply Dam was listed on the New South Wales State Heritage Register on 2 April 1999.
