= Goondah railway station =

Former railway station in New South Wales, Australia

Goondah

General information
- Location: Goondah Rd, Goondah, New South Wales; Australia
- Coordinates: 34°44′03″S 148°43′59″E
- Operator: Public Transport Commission
- Lines: Main South line Burrinjuck line
- Distance: 339.900 km from Central
- Platforms: 2 (2 side)
- Tracks: 2

Construction
- Structure type: Ground

History
- Opened: 1 August 1891
- Closed: 9 March 1975
- Rebuilt: 7 May 1916

Services
Preceding station	Former services	Following station
Emu Flat towards Albury	Main Southern Line (1891–1916)	Bowning towards Sydney
Illalong Creek towards Albury	Main Southern Line (1916–1975)	Bowning towards Sydney
Location

Goondah railway station was a railway station in Goondah, New South Wales, Australia on the Main South Line 340 kilometres (210 mi) from Sydney.

== Tramway: Goondah-Burrinjuck line ==
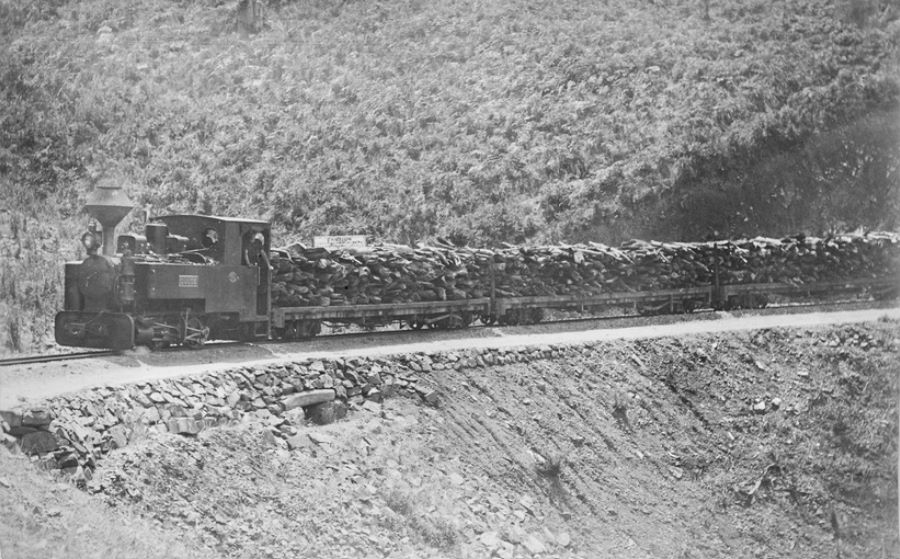
Narrow gauge train with German-built Krauss steam locomotive

During 1907 work commenced on the Barren Jack Reservoir. A 2 ft (610 mm) tram line was constructed adjacent to the station to carry supplies to the construction site 28 miles (45 km) away.

== Deviation ==
When the railway was duplicated, the first station was replaced by one on a new alignment.
