= Burrinjuck, New South Wales =

Burrinjuck
- Town
- Coordinates: 34°58′35″S 148°37′23″E
- Country: Australia
- State: New South Wales
- LGA: Yass Valley
- Location: 324 km (201 mi) from Sydney; 177 km (110 mi) from Wagga Wagga; 28 km (17 mi) from Bookham; 15 km (9.3 mi) from Woolgarlo

Government
  - State electorate: Goulburn
  - Federal division: Riverina
- Elevation: 574 m (1,883 ft)

Population
  - Total: 19 (2016 census)
- Postcode: 2582
- County: Harden
- Parish: Childowla
- Mean max temp: 20.7 °C (69.3 °F)
- Mean min temp: 9.2 °C (48.6 °F)
- Annual rainfall: 926.6 mm (36.48 in)
Localities around Burrinjuck
| Bookham | Bookham | Woolgarlo |
| Adjungbilly | Burrinjuck | Narrangullen |
| Adjungbilly | Wee Jasper | Narrangullen |

Burrinjuck is a village community in the far eastern part of the Riverina, in the South West Slopes of New South Wales. By road it is about 15 kilometres (9.3 mi) southwest of Woolgarlo and 28 kilometres (17 mi) south from Bookham. The name of the town is derived from an Aboriginal word meaning 'mountain with a rugged top'. At the 2016 census, the Burrinjuck area had a population of 19.

The village is on the western side of Burrinjuck Dam which holds water from the Murrumbidgee River and which was constructed between 1907 and 1928 (with World War I interfering with the timing of the construction).

During the construction of the dam and in the time during which it filled, there was a settlement known as 'Barren Jack City' facing the river at the base of the Burrinjuck mountain. Much of its site was later submerged as the dam water rose.

Burrinjuck includes part of one of the proposed sites for Australia's national capital, which was known as Mahkoolma. The capital was to be located in the upper reaches of nearby Carrolls Creek,

Barren Jack Post Office opened on 23 May 1907, was renamed Burrinjuck in 1911, and closed in 1979.

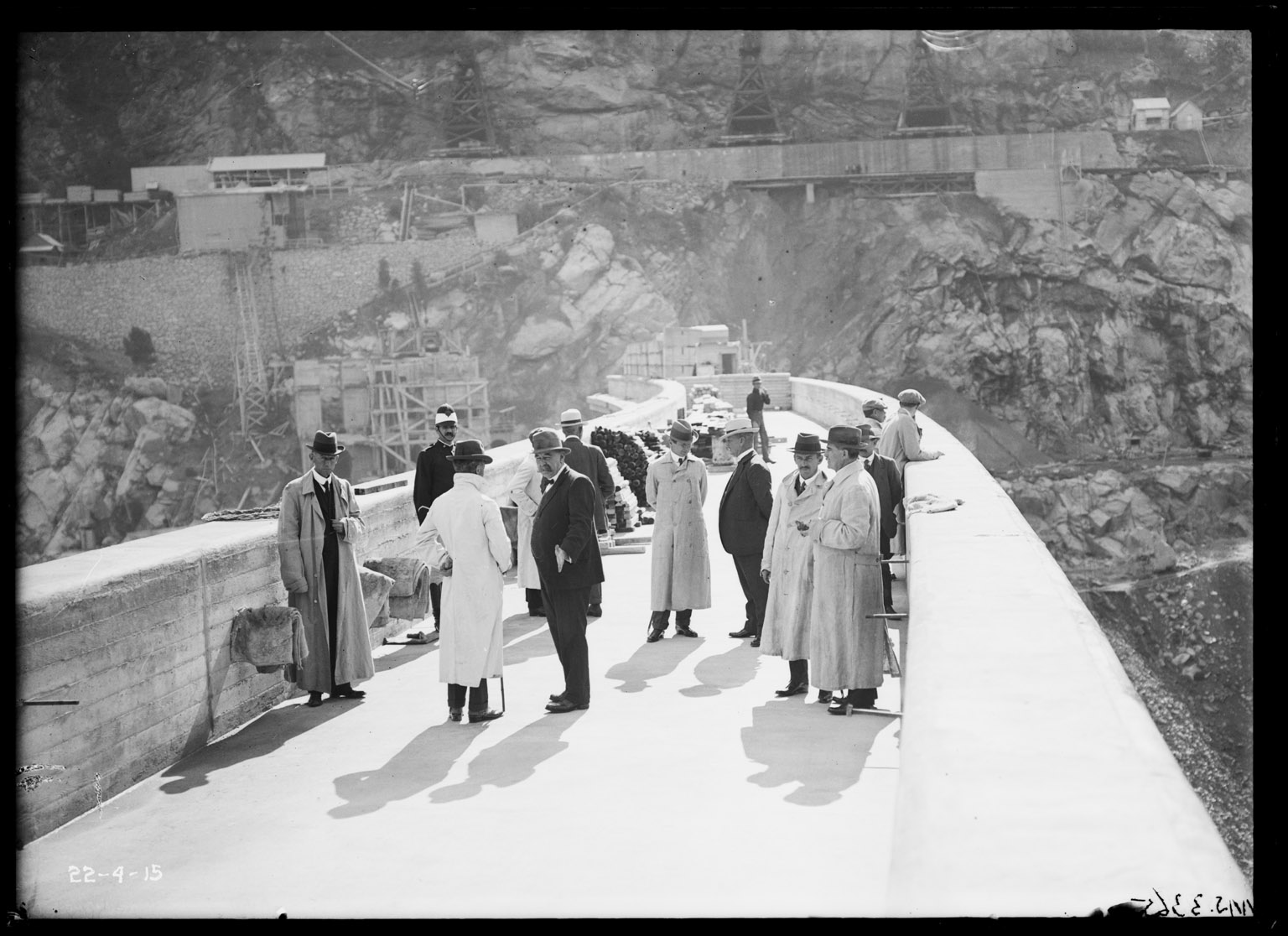
Visit of State Governors to Burrinjuck Dam in 1915

== Heritage listings ==
Burrinjuck has a number of heritage-listed sites, including:

- Barren Jack Creek Water Supply Dam
- Burrinjuck Dam
- Greater Burrinjuck Dam Site

== Climate ==
Located on the exposed western slopes of the Brindabella Range, rainfall peaks distinctly in winter. While snow is a rare occurrence at the bottom of the valley, it does occur annually on the surrounding ranges and hilly country above 700 metres (such as at Wee Jasper); nearby Black Andrew Mountain (935 metres) and Mount Barren Jack (972 metres) overlooking the lake, can be periodically snow-capped during the winter months.

Climate data for Burrinjuck Dam (1908–2023, extremes 1965–2023); 390 m AMSL; 35.00° S, 148.60° E
| Month | Jan | Feb | Mar | Apr | May | Jun | Jul | Aug | Sep | Oct | Nov | Dec | Year |
|---|---|---|---|---|---|---|---|---|---|---|---|---|---|
| Record high °C (°F) | 45.6 (114.1) | 44.3 (111.7) | 39.0 (102.2) | 34.0 (93.2) | 29.0 (84.2) | 21.5 (70.7) | 20.6 (69.1) | 24.5 (76.1) | 30.0 (86.0) | 34.0 (93.2) | 39.4 (102.9) | 42.1 (107.8) | 45.6 (114.1) |
| Mean daily maximum °C (°F) | 29.8 (85.6) | 29.0 (84.2) | 26.1 (79.0) | 21.1 (70.0) | 16.2 (61.2) | 12.5 (54.5) | 11.7 (53.1) | 13.5 (56.3) | 16.9 (62.4) | 20.5 (68.9) | 24.0 (75.2) | 27.7 (81.9) | 20.7 (69.4) |
| Mean daily minimum °C (°F) | 15.6 (60.1) | 15.7 (60.3) | 13.4 (56.1) | 9.6 (49.3) | 6.4 (43.5) | 4.2 (39.6) | 3.0 (37.4) | 3.7 (38.7) | 5.6 (42.1) | 8.4 (47.1) | 11.1 (52.0) | 13.7 (56.7) | 9.2 (48.6) |
| Record low °C (°F) | 5.9 (42.6) | 7.0 (44.6) | 3.1 (37.6) | 0.9 (33.6) | −0.7 (30.7) | −3.8 (25.2) | −7.0 (19.4) | −4.0 (24.8) | −6.1 (21.0) | 0.5 (32.9) | 2.6 (36.7) | 4.7 (40.5) | −7.0 (19.4) |
| Average precipitation mm (inches) | 63.1 (2.48) | 56.1 (2.21) | 62.5 (2.46) | 64.7 (2.55) | 79.8 (3.14) | 96.0 (3.78) | 100.1 (3.94) | 97.7 (3.85) | 83.4 (3.28) | 85.5 (3.37) | 74.3 (2.93) | 63.1 (2.48) | 926.6 (36.48) |
| Average precipitation days (≥ 0.2 mm) | 6.5 | 5.7 | 6.3 | 6.9 | 9.3 | 12.0 | 13.2 | 13.4 | 10.9 | 10.3 | 8.6 | 7.4 | 110.5 |
Source: Australian Bureau of Meteorology; Burrinjuck Dam

Climate data for Billapaloola State Forest (1938–1969); 808 m AMSL; 35.27° S, 148.38° E
| Month | Jan | Feb | Mar | Apr | May | Jun | Jul | Aug | Sep | Oct | Nov | Dec | Year |
|---|---|---|---|---|---|---|---|---|---|---|---|---|---|
| Mean daily maximum °C (°F) | 26.6 (79.9) | 25.6 (78.1) | 23.1 (73.6) | 17.1 (62.8) | 12.6 (54.7) | 9.3 (48.7) | 8.4 (47.1) | 9.8 (49.6) | 13.8 (56.8) | 16.6 (61.9) | 20.0 (68.0) | 24.3 (75.7) | 17.3 (63.1) |
| Mean daily minimum °C (°F) | 12.1 (53.8) | 11.8 (53.2) | 9.8 (49.6) | 5.8 (42.4) | 3.2 (37.8) | 1.2 (34.2) | 0.1 (32.2) | 0.5 (32.9) | 2.4 (36.3) | 4.8 (40.6) | 7.2 (45.0) | 10.0 (50.0) | 5.7 (42.3) |
| Average precipitation mm (inches) | 86.9 (3.42) | 71.4 (2.81) | 98.8 (3.89) | 113.7 (4.48) | 163.4 (6.43) | 156.1 (6.15) | 172.6 (6.80) | 162.9 (6.41) | 132.6 (5.22) | 145.0 (5.71) | 120.1 (4.73) | 86.5 (3.41) | 1,516.8 (59.72) |
| Average precipitation days (≥ 0.2 mm) | 5.8 | 5.6 | 6.1 | 7.9 | 10.9 | 12.3 | 13.4 | 13.6 | 10.3 | 11.1 | 8.7 | 7.0 | 112.7 |
Source: Australian Bureau of Meteorology; Billapaloola State Forest
