= Wee Jasper, New South Wales =

Wee Jasper
- Town
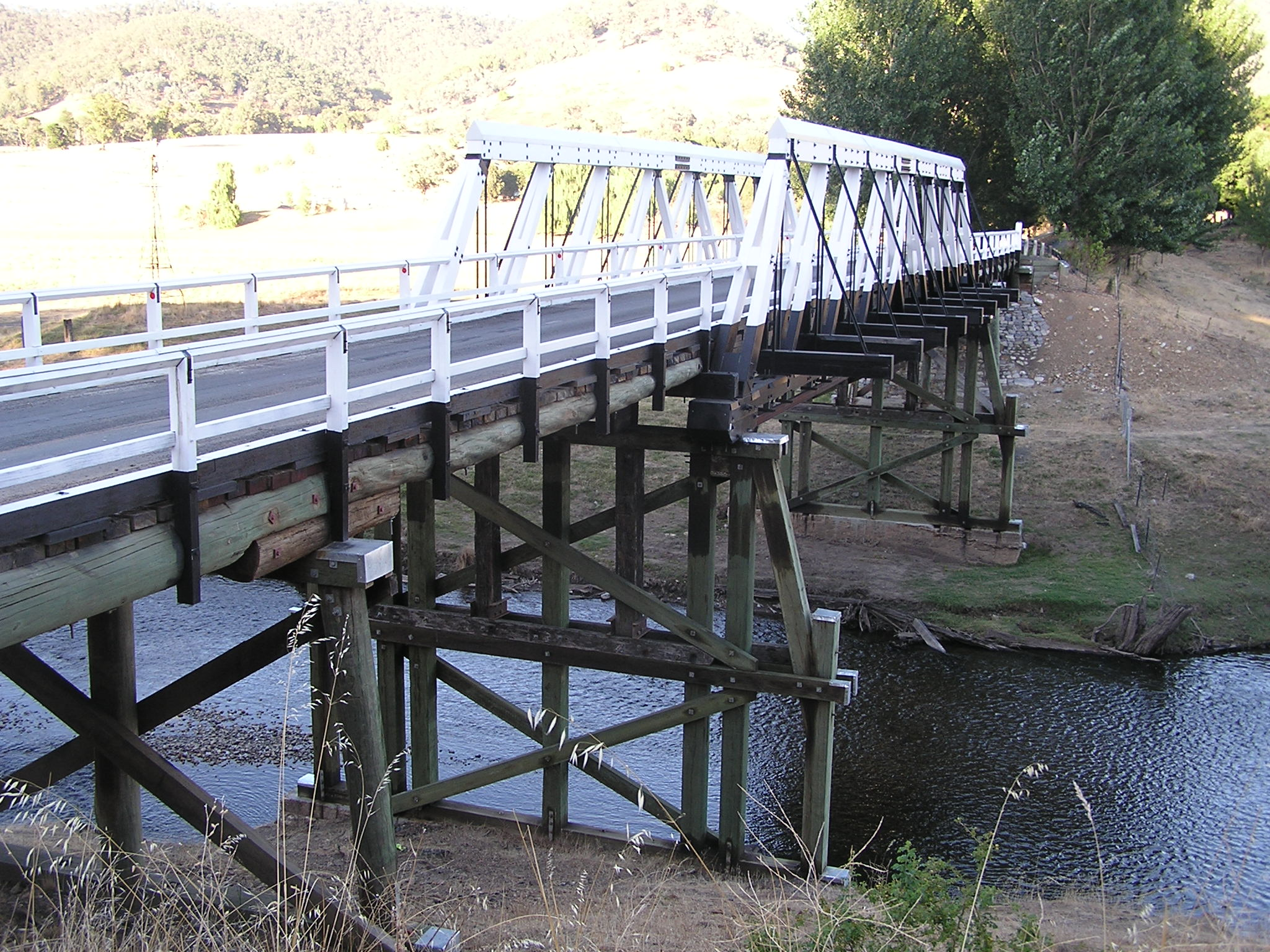
- Bridge across Goodradigbee River at Wee Jasper

- Interactive map of Wee Jasper
- Coordinates: 35°06′0″S 148°40′0″E
- Country: Australia
- State: New South Wales
- LGA: Yass Valley Council
- Location: 92 km (57 mi) from Canberra; 62 km (39 mi) from Yass

Government
  - State electorate: Goulburn
  - Federal division: Riverina
- Elevation: 376–1,121 m (1,234–3,678 ft)

Population
  - Total: 127 (2021 census)
- Postcode: 2582
- County: Buccleuch
- Mean max temp: 17.3 °C (63.1 °F)
- Mean min temp: 5.7 °C (42.3 °F)
- Annual rainfall: 1,516.8 mm (59.72 in)
Localities around Wee Jasper
Adjungbilly	Burrinjuck	Narrangullen
Adjungbilly	Wee Jasper	Mullion
Tumorrama	Brindabella	Uriarra

Wee Jasper is a locality and former village in the Yass Valley Shire in New South Wales, Australia, about 90 km north-west of Canberra and 60 km south-west of Yass. It is in the Goodradigbee valley at the western foot of the Brindabella Ranges, near Burrinjuck Dam. At the 2021 census, Wee Jasper and the surrounding area had a population of 127.

== Name Wee Jasper ==
The origin of the name Wee Jasper is unknown but it is possibly of Aboriginal origin. It has been in use since at latest 1848 when it appeared as "Weejasper". In 1970, the place name was changed, officially, from Weejasper to Wee Jasper.

== History ==
The Ngunnawal people once lived over the site of Wee Jasper and the surrounding Goodradigbee River valley. Diseases decimated aboriginal populations ahead of colonial settlement. The New South Wales colonial government ineffectually prohibited settlement in the area and others outside the Nineteen Counties but livestock herders reached the valley early. The Hume and Hovell expedition passed through the area in October 1824.

In 1831, the land of "Cooradigbee", south of Wee Jasper, was granted to William Hampden Dutton. It was one of the last free land grants in the colony of New South Wales and was made only because it had been promised by Governor Darling, in October 1830. In December 1848, the County of Buccleuch and neighbouring County of Cowley were proclaimed. In 1866, a site for a Goodradigbee village was proclaimed but never eventuated and was cancelled in 1900. A cluster of settlement, which would become Wee Jasper, developed further up the river, nearer the eventual bridge site.

"Coodra Vale", a property of 40,000 acres (16,188 ha) close to Wee Jasper, was the home of pastoralist Stewart Ryrie Jr from 1871 until his death in 1882. From 1908 to 1912, "Coodra Vale" was the home of renowned Australian poet, A.B. "Banjo" Paterson, and his poem, A Mountain Station, was informed by the time he spent there as an agriculturalist.

In the 1890s, gold was mined in 'The Wee Jasper' goldfield, south of Wee Jasper, along the Goodradigbee creek of which Wee Jasper Creek is a tributary. The Goodradigbee Goldfield, which included the area, was proclaimed in 1882 but revoked in 1897 and the area was never a significant goldfield.

In 1896, the bridge across the Goodradigbee River at Wee Jasper was opened, providing better connection to Yass and Tumut. By 1887, Wee Jasper had a police station. Wee Jasper Post Office first opened in January 1886, closed in March 1892, reopened in 1895 and remained in service until 1994. in 1899, a school was opened as a provisional school and achieved public school status in 1918. Wee Jasper had a Catholic church, now re-purposed.

== Activities ==
The area is known for its caves and fossils, camping, canoeing and fishing. Near the village are several camping and recreation reserves close to numerous caves. The best known cave is Carey's Cave, a system of seven caverns lying just north of the town. Others lie to the north and south, including Dip, Dogleg, Punch-bowl and Signature Caves. Wee Jasper is also home to the Wee Jasper Distillery.

Fossils, including members of the Acanthothoracid placoderm fish family Weejasperaspididae, the primitive placoderm Brindabellaspis stensioi and the prehistoric lungfish, Dipnorhynchus cathlesae, have been found in the area.

== Climate ==
Wee Jasper has a temperate oceanic climate (Cfb) in a cold rainforest zone, with mild to warm summers and chilly, very wet winters. Due to its exposed north-western location on the Brindabella Ranges, cold fronts and Northwest cloudbands often bring extreme rainfall totals and moderate to heavy snowfalls above 800 metres (2,600 ft) in elevation. Annual rainfall is in the order of 1,520 millimetres (60 in) − nearly thrice as wet as Canberra on the eastern side of the Brindabellas. Seasonal range is considerable, with mean maxima from 26.6 °C (79.9 °F) in January to 8.4 °C (47.1 °F) in July.

Climate data for Billapaloola State Forest (1938–1969); 808 m AMSL; 35.27° S, 148.38° E
Month	Jan	Feb	Mar	Apr	May	Jun	Jul	Aug	Sep	Oct	Nov	Dec	Year
Mean daily maximum °C (°F)	26.6 (79.9)	25.6 (78.1)	23.1 (73.6)	17.1 (62.8)	12.6 (54.7)	9.3 (48.7)	8.4 (47.1)	9.8 (49.6)	13.8 (56.8)	16.6 (61.9)	20.0 (68.0)	24.3 (75.7)	17.3 (63.1)
Mean daily minimum °C (°F)	12.1 (53.8)	11.8 (53.2)	9.8 (49.6)	5.8 (42.4)	3.2 (37.8)	1.2 (34.2)	0.1 (32.2)	0.5 (32.9)	2.4 (36.3)	4.8 (40.6)	7.2 (45.0)	10.0 (50.0)	5.7 (42.3)
Average precipitation mm (inches)	86.9 (3.42)	71.4 (2.81)	98.8 (3.89)	113.7 (4.48)	163.4 (6.43)	156.1 (6.15)	172.6 (6.80)	162.9 (6.41)	132.6 (5.22)	145.0 (5.71)	120.1 (4.73)	86.5 (3.41)	1,516.8 (59.72)
Average precipitation days (≥ 0.2 mm)	5.8	5.6	6.1	7.9	10.9	12.3	13.4	13.6	10.3	11.1	8.7	7.0	112.7
Source: Australian Bureau of Meteorology; Billapaloola State Forest

== Heritage listings ==
Wee Jasper has a number of heritage-listed sites, including:

- 278 Main Road: Wee Jasper Bridge over Goodradigbee River

== Gallery ==
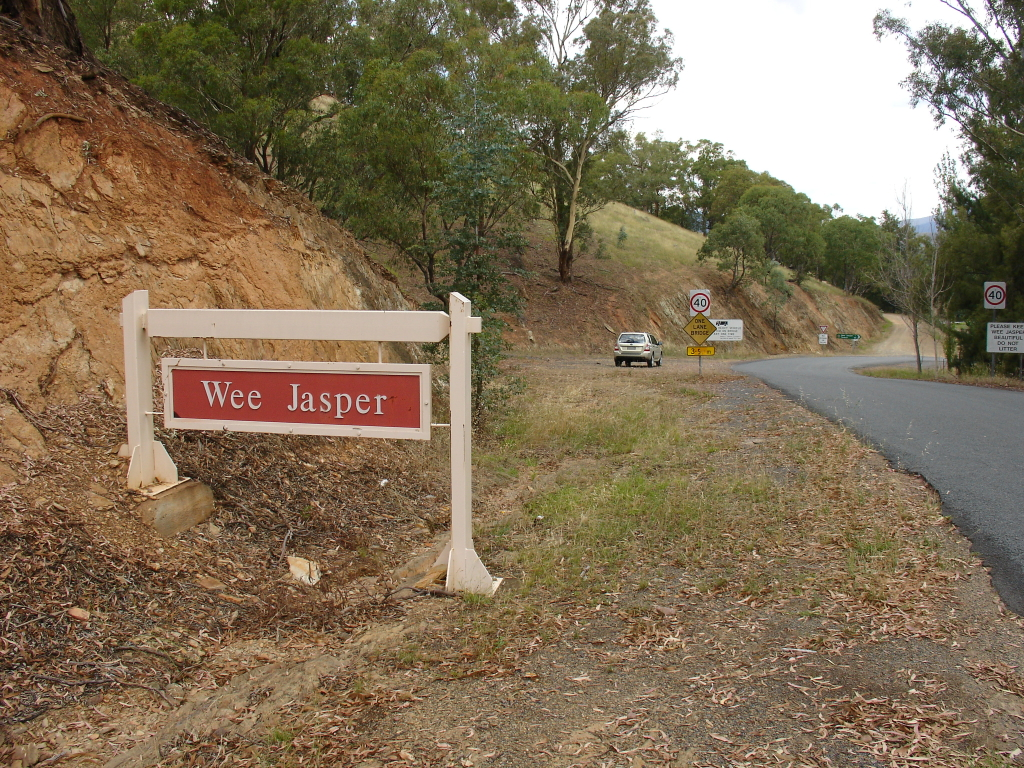
Wee Jasper town sign

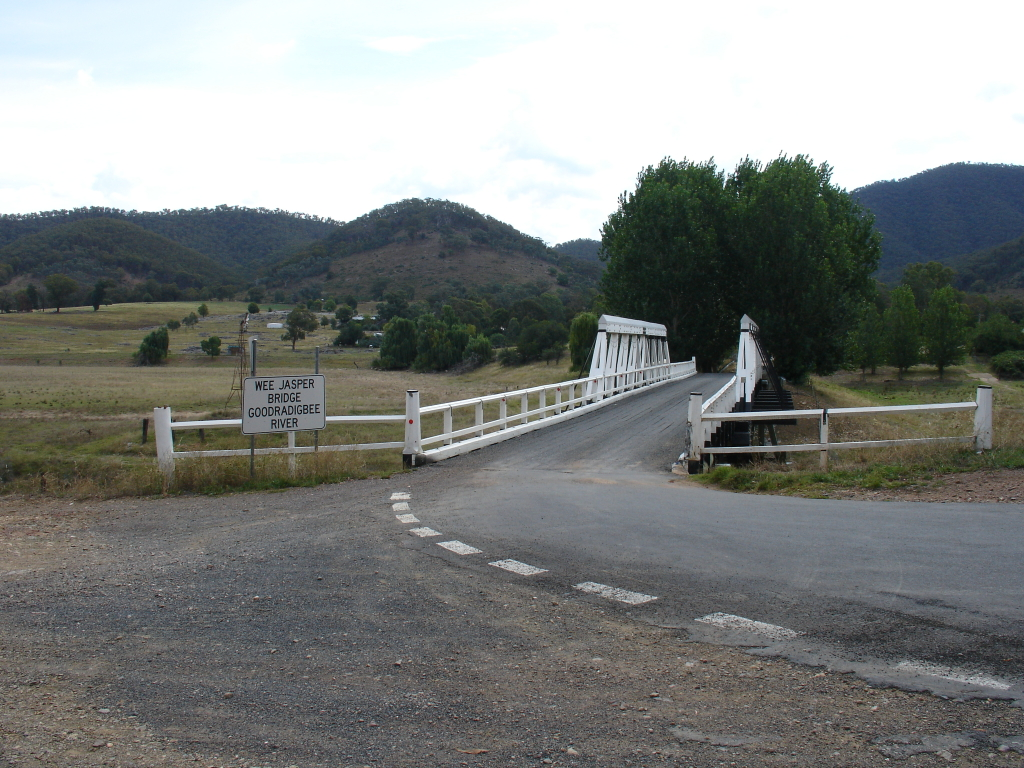
The main bridge spanning the Goodradigbee River going into Wee Jasper
