= Yass Valley Council =

Yass Valley
- Local government area
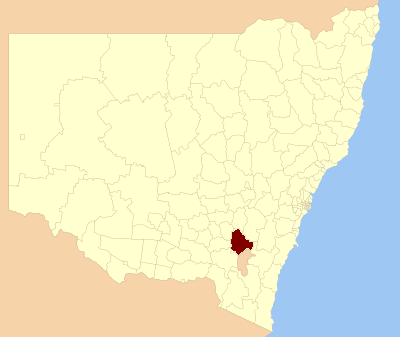
- Location in New South Wales

- Interactive map of Yass Valley
- Coordinates: 34°51′S 148°55′E
- Country: Australia
- State: New South Wales
- Region: Southern Tablelands
- Established: 11 February 2004
- Council seat: Yass

Government
  - Mayor: Jasmin Jones
  - State electorate: Goulburn
  - Federal division: Riverina

Area
  - Total: 3,999 km^{2} (1,544 sq mi)

Population
  - Totals: 16,142 (2016 census); 16,953 (2018 est.)
  - Density: 4.0365/km^{2} (10.4545/sq mi)
- Website: Yass Valley
LGAs around Yass Valley
Hilltops	Hilltops	Upper Lachlan
Cootamundra-Gundagai	Yass Valley	Goulburn
Snowy Valleys	ACT	Queanbeyan-Palerang

Yass Valley Council is a local government area in the Southern Tablelands region of New South Wales, Australia. The area is located adjacent to the Hume and Barton Highways and the Main Southern railway line.

The Shire includes the towns, and extensive rural and residential areas of:

- Yass
- Binalong
- Bowning
- Bywong (part)
- Gundaroo
- Murrumbateman
- Parkwood
- Sutton (part)
- Wallaroo

It also includes the localities of:

- Bango
- Bellmount Forest (part)
- Boambolo
- Bookham
- Brindabella (part)
- Burrinjuck
- Cavan
- Good Hope
- Jeir
- Kangiara
- Laverstock
- Manton
- Marchmont
- Mullion
- Nanima
- Narrangullen
- Springrange
- Uriarra (part)
- Wee Jasper
- Woolgarlo
- Yass River

The Yass Shire was proclaimed on 1 January 1980 following the amalgamation of Goodradigbee Shire and the Municipality of Yass. Yass Shire in turn was dissolved and merged into the Yass Valley Council on 11 February 2004, following a further amalgamation of Yass Shire and parts of Gunning and Yarrowlumla Shires.

The mayor of Yass Valley Council is Allan McGrath.

== Demographics ==
At the 2016 census, Yass Valley had a population of 16,142, 7,931 males and 8,209 females. It had grown from 15,020 at the 2011 census, an increase of 7.5%. In the previous five years it grew by 14.4% from 13,135 at the 2006 census. There were 400 people (2.5%) who identified as being of Indigenous origin in the 2016 census. The median age was 42 years.

82.8% of the population was born in Australia. 3.6% were born in England, 1.2% in New Zealand and 0.4% in each of Germany, the United States and Netherlands. English was stated as the only language spoken at home by 14,550 people (90.2%). The three most common languages spoken at home other than English were Croatian (0.4%), German (0.4%) and Dutch (0.2%). 84.3% of households had at least one resident who accessed the internet by any type of electronic device.

The median weekly individual income for people aged 15 years and over at the 2016 census was $869 (Australian average: $662). The median weekly family was $2,214 (Australian average: $1,734) and the median household family was $1,879 (Australian average: $1,438).

In the 2016 census, there were 5,185 separate houses (94.0%), 216 semi detached, row or terrace houses and townhouses (3.9%), 27 flats, units or apartments (0.5%) and 37 other dwellings (0.7%). Of all occupied private dwellings, 4,343 were either fully owned or being purchased, which represents (78.6%) of all occupied private dwellings, while 1,011 (18.3%) were being rented.

Selected historical census data for Yass Valley local government area
Census year		2006	2011	2016
Population	Estimated residents on census night	13,135	▲15,020	▲16,142
Population	LGA rank in terms of size within New South Wales		73rd	▼74th
Population	% of New South Wales population			
Population	% of Australian population			
Cultural and language diversity				
Ancestry, top responses	English			
Ancestry, top responses	Australian			82.8%
Ancestry, top responses	Italian			
Ancestry, top responses	Chinese			
Ancestry, top responses	Irish			
Language, top responses (other than English)	Italian			
Language, top responses (other than English)	Mandarin			
Language, top responses (other than English)	Cantonese			
Language, top responses (other than English)	Korean			
Language, top responses (other than English)	Greek			
Religious affiliation				
Religious affiliation, top responses	Catholic			
Religious affiliation, top responses	No religion			
Religious affiliation, top responses	Anglican			
Religious affiliation, top responses	Eastern Orthodox			
Religious affiliation, top responses	Buddhism			
Median weekly incomes				
Personal income	Median weekly personal income	A$		A$869
Personal income	% of Australian median income			131.3%
Family income	Median weekly family income			A$2,214
Family income	% of Australian median income			127.7%
Household income	Median weekly household income			A$1,879
Household income	% of Australian median income			130.7%

== Council ==
=== Current composition and election method ===
Yass Valley Council is composed of nine councillors elected proportionally as one entire ward. All councillors are elected for a fixed four-year term of office. The mayor is elected by the councillors at the first meeting of the council. The most recent election was held on 4 December 2021.

== Election results ==
=== 2024 ===
2024 New South Wales local elections: Yass Valley
Party	Candidate	Votes	%	±%
Greens	1. Adrian Cameron (elected); 2. Tanya Cullen	1,421	14.71	
Independent	Kristin Butler (elected)	1,131	11.71	
Independent	David Rothwell (elected)	953	9.87	
Independent	Fleur Flanery (elected)	935	9.68	
Independent	Allan McGrath (elected)	883	9.14	
Independent	Cecil Burgess (elected)	869	9.00	
Independent	David Carter (elected)	814	8.43	
Independent	Jasmin Jones (elected)	756	7.83	
Independent	Alvaro Charry (elected)	758	7.85	
Independent	Cayla Pothan	701	7.26	
Independent	Matthew Stadtmiller	437	4.52	
Total formal votes		9,658	91.88	
Informal votes		853	8.12	
Turnout		10,511	80.87	

== Transport facilities ==
Yass Valley is serviced by the following transport facilities:

- Hume Highway (National Highway 31)
- Barton Highway (National Highway 25)
- Lachlan Valley Way (State Route 81)
- Main Southern Railway (NSW TrainLink)
- Transborder Express (A local bus & coach firm)
