= Burrinjuck Dam =

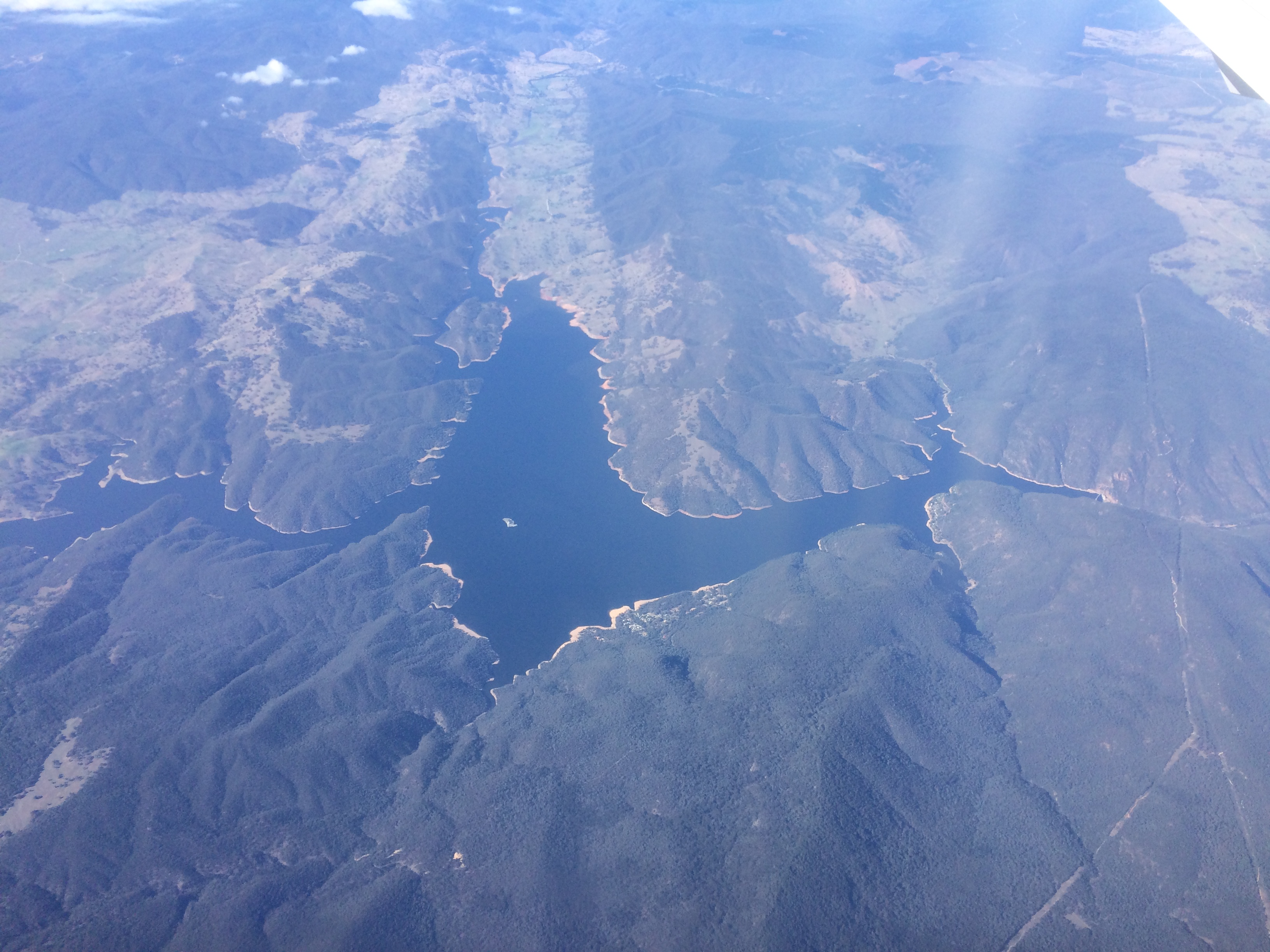
- Aerial view of Burrinjuck Dam, 2017

- Location of the Burrinjuck Dam in New South Wales
- Country: Australia
- Location: Burrinjuck, South West Slopes, New South Wales
- Coordinates: 34°59′54″S 148°35′04″E
- Status: Operational
- Construction began: 1907
- Opening date: 1928
- Owner: WaterNSW

Dam and spillways
- Type of dam: Gravity dam
- Impounds: Murrumbidgee River
- Height: 93 m (305 ft)
- Length: 233 m (764 ft)
- Dam volume: 394,000 m^{3} (13,900,000 cu ft)
- Spillways: 3
- Spillway type: Three sector gates with two side channel spillways
- Spillway capacity: 29,100 m^{3}/s (1,030,000 cu ft/s)

Reservoir
- Creates: Lake Burrinjuck
- Total capacity: 1,026 gigalitres (3.62×10^{10} cu ft)
- Catchment area: 12,953 km^{2} (5,001 sq mi)
- Surface area: 5,500 ha (14,000 acres)
- Maximum water depth: 72 m (236 ft)

Power Station
- Operator: Foresight Group
- Commission date: 1928
- Turbines: 3 (2x6, 1x16)
- Installed capacity: 28 MW
- Annual generation: 24.5 gigawatt-hours (88 TJ)
- Website; Burrinjuck Dam at WaterNSW

Burrinjuck Dam is a gated, concrete-walled hydro-electric gravity dam at Burrinjuck, in the South West Slopes region of New South Wales, Australia. It has three spillways across the Murrumbidgee River and forms an impounded reservoir called Lake Burrinjuck. In addition to electricity generation, Burrinjuck Dam is used for purposes including flood mitigation, irrigation, water supply and conservation. Also known as Barren Jack Dam and Barrenjack, it was added to the New South Wales State Heritage Register on 2 April 1999.

== Overview ==
Commenced in 1907, completed in 1928, and upgraded in 1957 and 1994, Burrinjuck Dam is a major gated dam, located approximately 60 kilometres (37 mi) south-west of Yass. It was designed by Lawrence Augustus Burton Wade and built between 1907 and 1927 by Lane & Peters of Sydney on behalf of the New South Wales Water, Conservation & Irrigation Commission and the NSW Department of Public Works. The dam's original purpose was to provide town water supplies, river flows and meet domestic requirements for irrigated agriculture, industry, flood mitigation and environmental flows.

Burrinjuck Dam divides the upper and lower catchment of the Murrumbidgee River, while both the Yass and Goodradigbee rivers flow into the reservoir. Together with releases from Blowering Dam, on the Tumut River, this infrastructure provides a regulated flow of water for the Coleambally and Murrumbidgee Irrigation Areas Lake Burrinjuck is the headwater storage for the Murrumbidgee Irrigation Area.

== History ==
=== Concept ===
The pastoralist Samuel McCaughey accumulated hundreds of thousands of hectares in the Riverina after owning his first property in 1864. He had an interest in water conservation that led him to construct a series of irrigation channels and steam pumps that were critical to the rice-growing activities in the area at the turn of the century. The New South Wales government liked his ideas so much they agreed to build a larger dam.

=== Initial construction ===
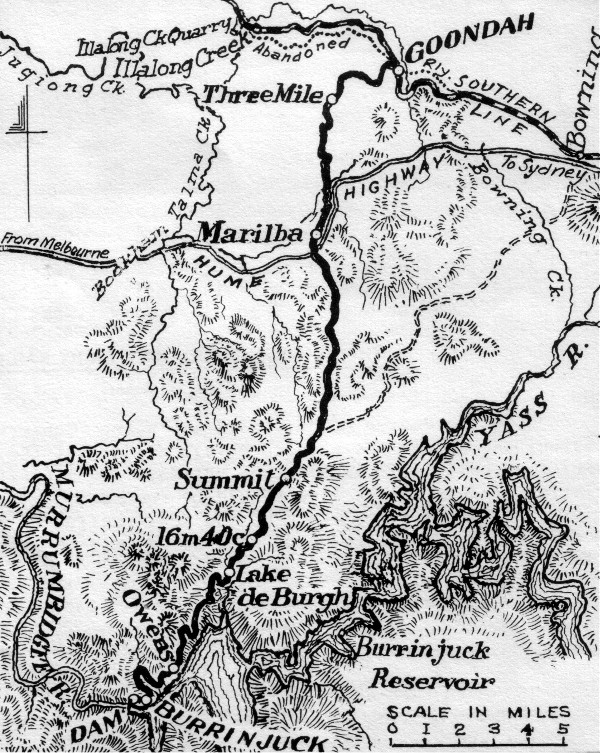
The Goondah-Burrinjuck Light Railway

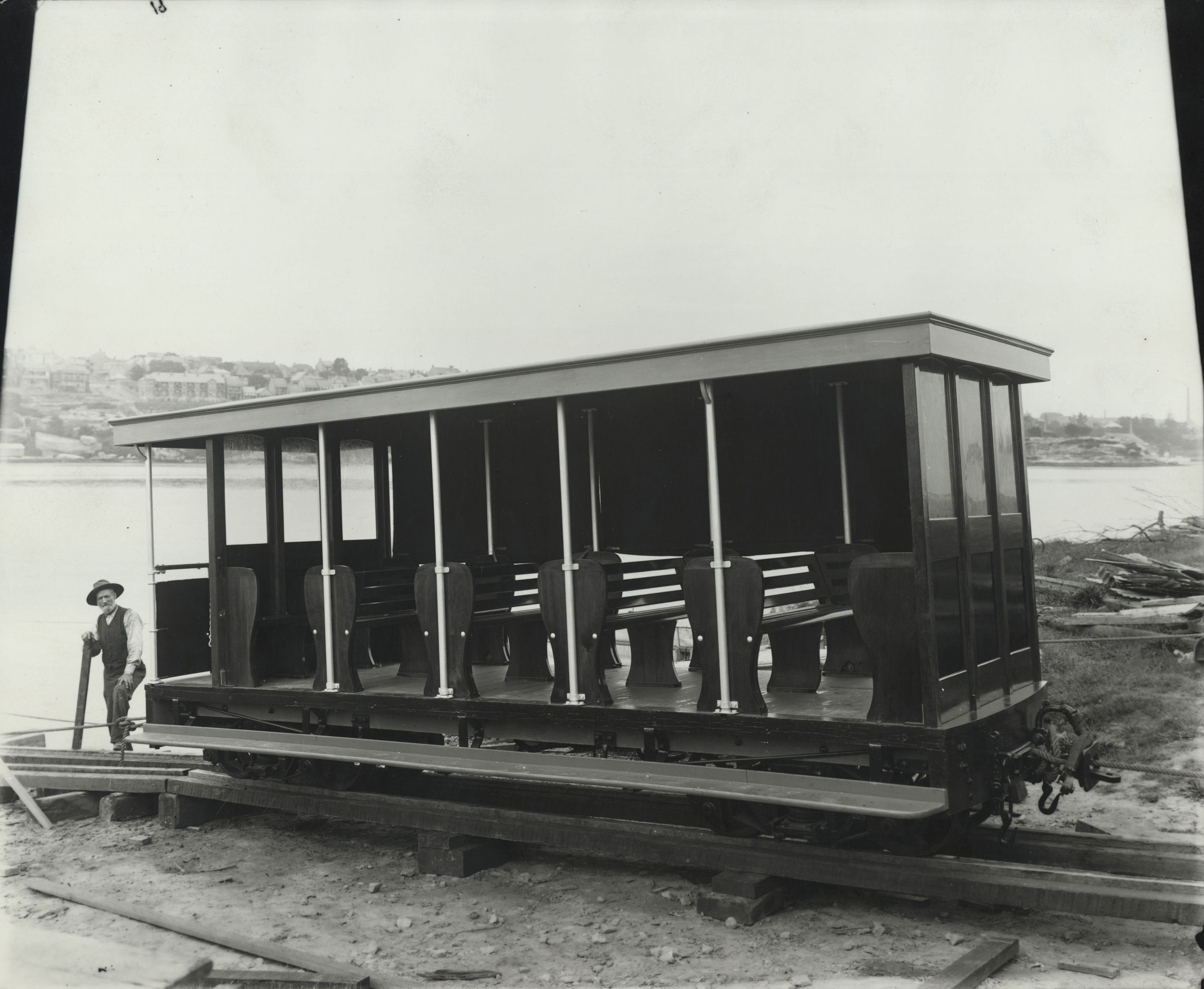
Car built for the railway

The announcement for the construction of the dam was made on 26 November 1906 via a resolution made by the New South Wales Legislative Assembly in regards to, "the Barren Jack Storage Reservoir and Northern Murrumbidgee Irrigation Scheme".

Construction commenced in 1907. Prior to about February 1911, the dam was known as Barren Jack, a corruption of the Aboriginal name of the locality. A 2 ft (610 mm) narrow gauge railway was constructed from the New South Wales Government Railways' Main Southern Line at Goondah to bring materials to the site. The railway was about 45 kilometres (28 mi) long, had a grade of 1 in 30 and some 90 foot-radius curves and took about 2 hours and 20 minutes to traverse.

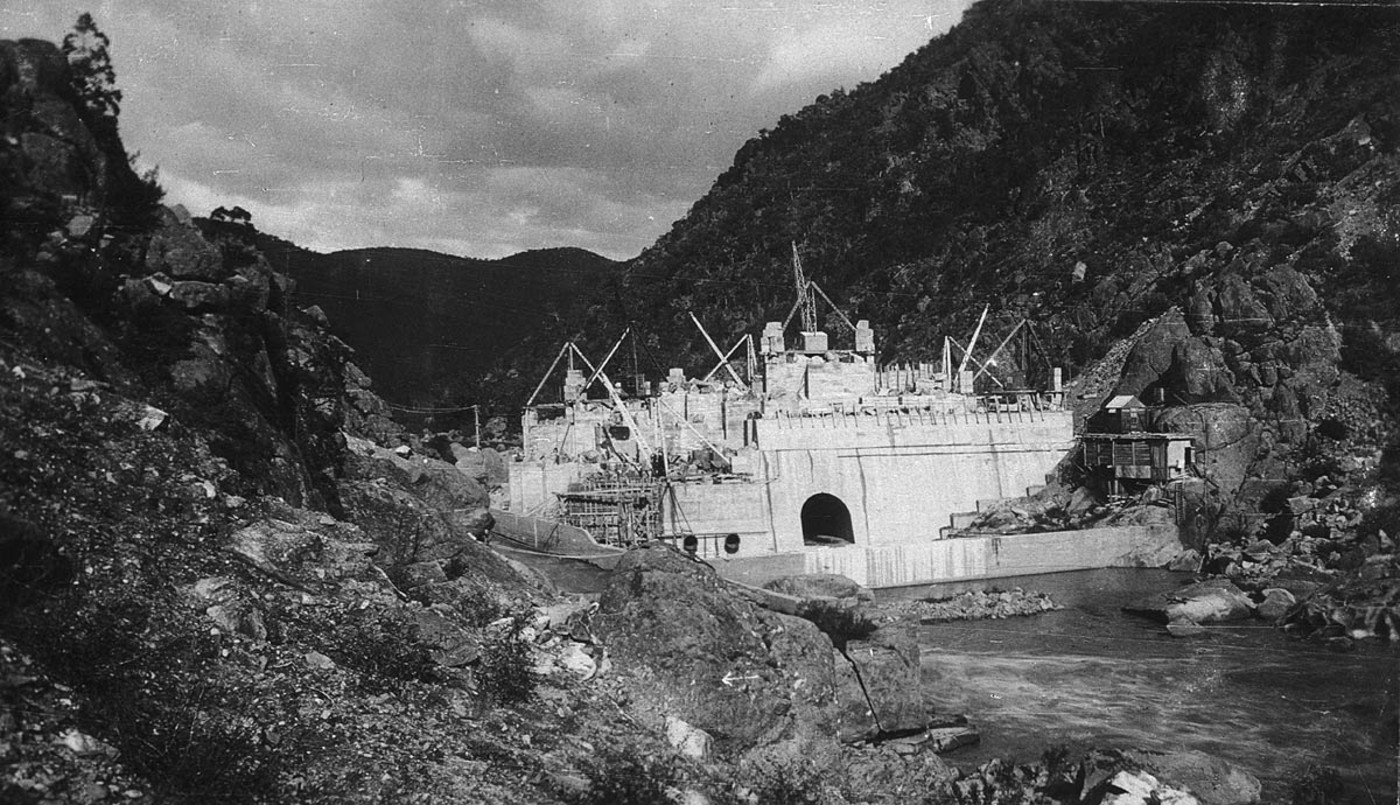
Burrinjuck Dam under construction, 1911

Delays were experienced throughout the construction period. Problems were found in part of the foundations of the dam wall in 1911, which led to a 12-month delay in completion of the first stage of the construction works. Delays were caused by World War I, construction of extensions to the spillways, and the fact that deep foundations were necessary.

Burrinjuck Dam construction

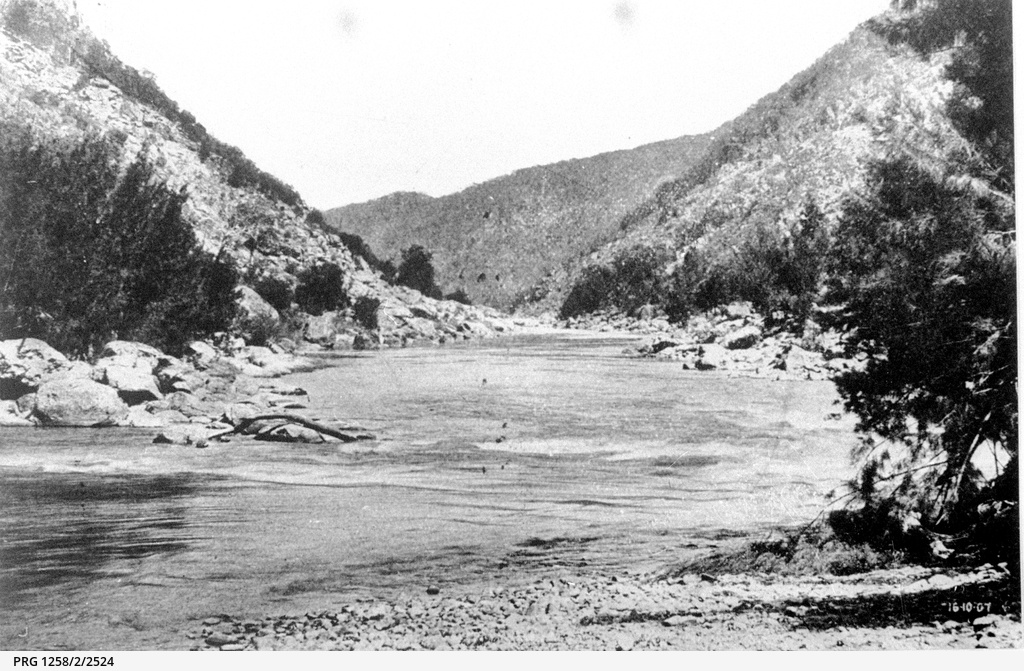
Site of the Burrinjuck dam on the Murrumbidgee River, prior to construction

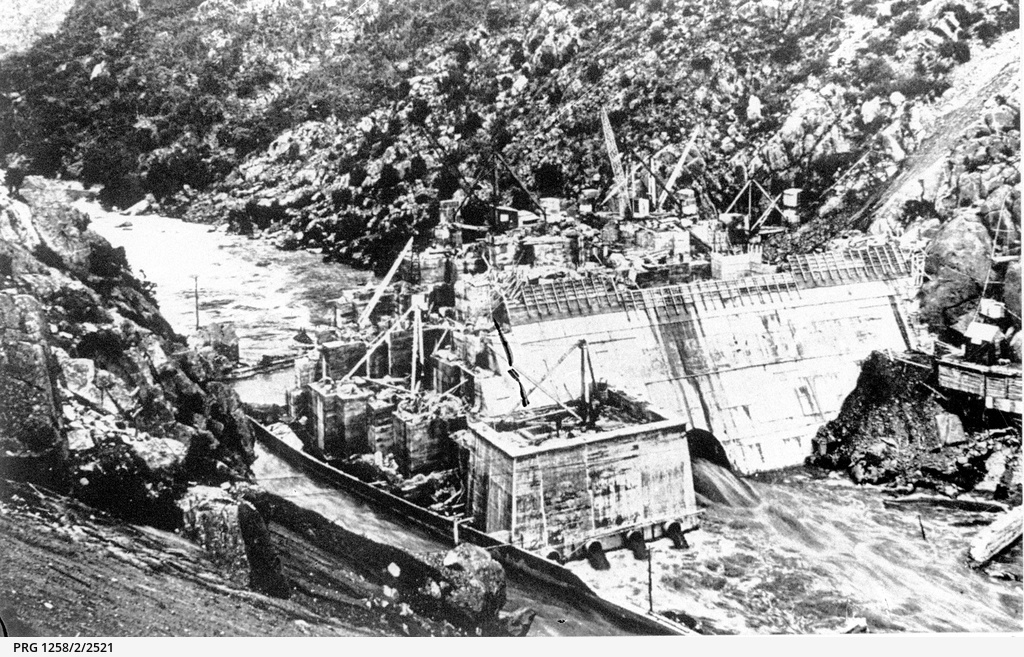
Burrinjuck dam being constructed looking upstream

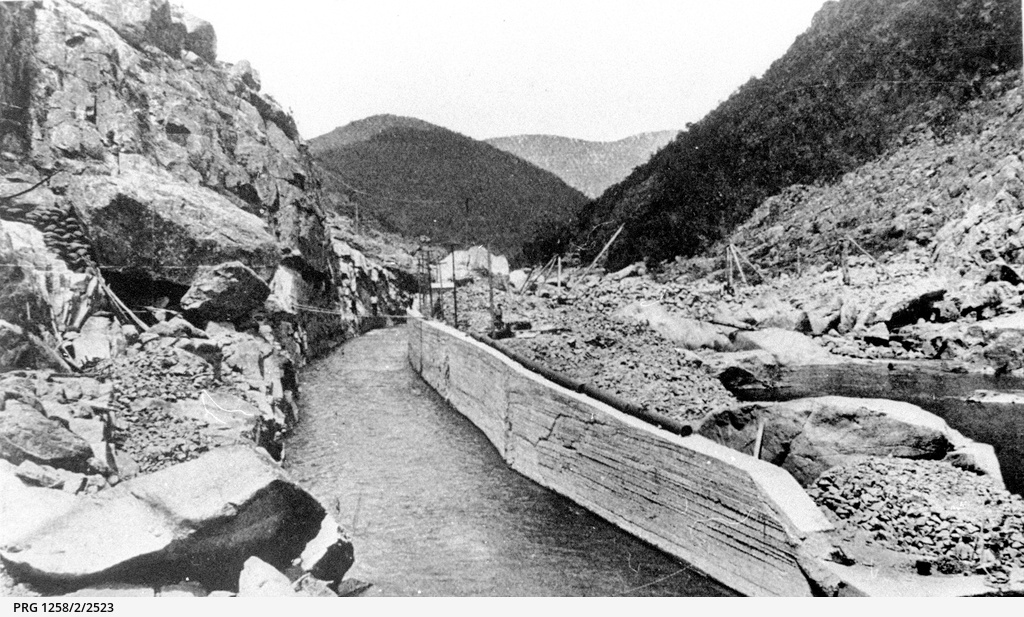
Burrinjuck dam showing Cotter Dam by-pass foundations

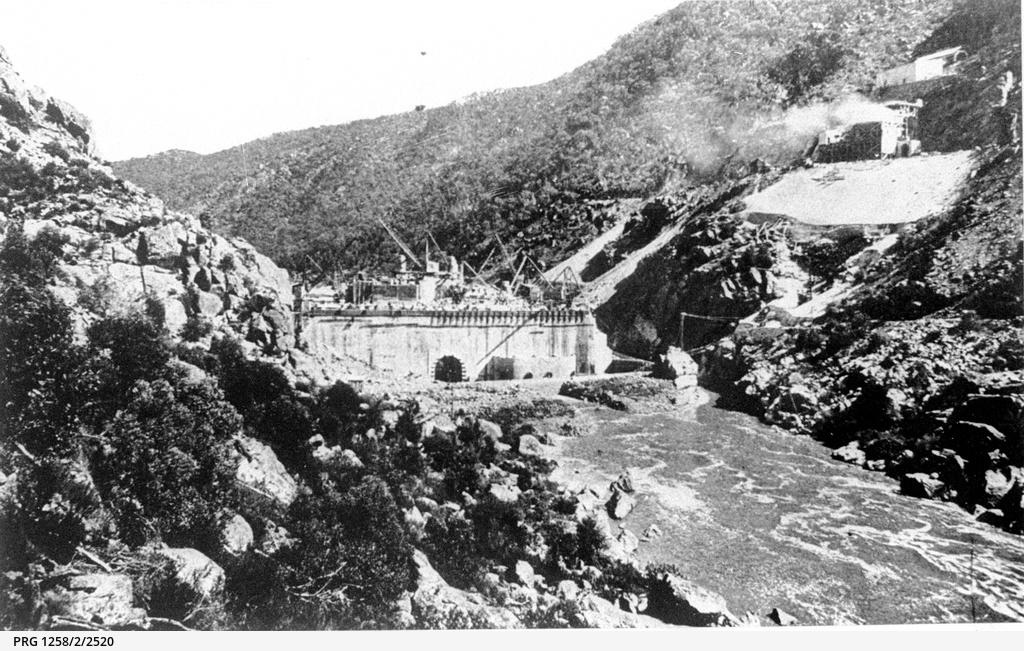
Building the Burrinjuck dam wall

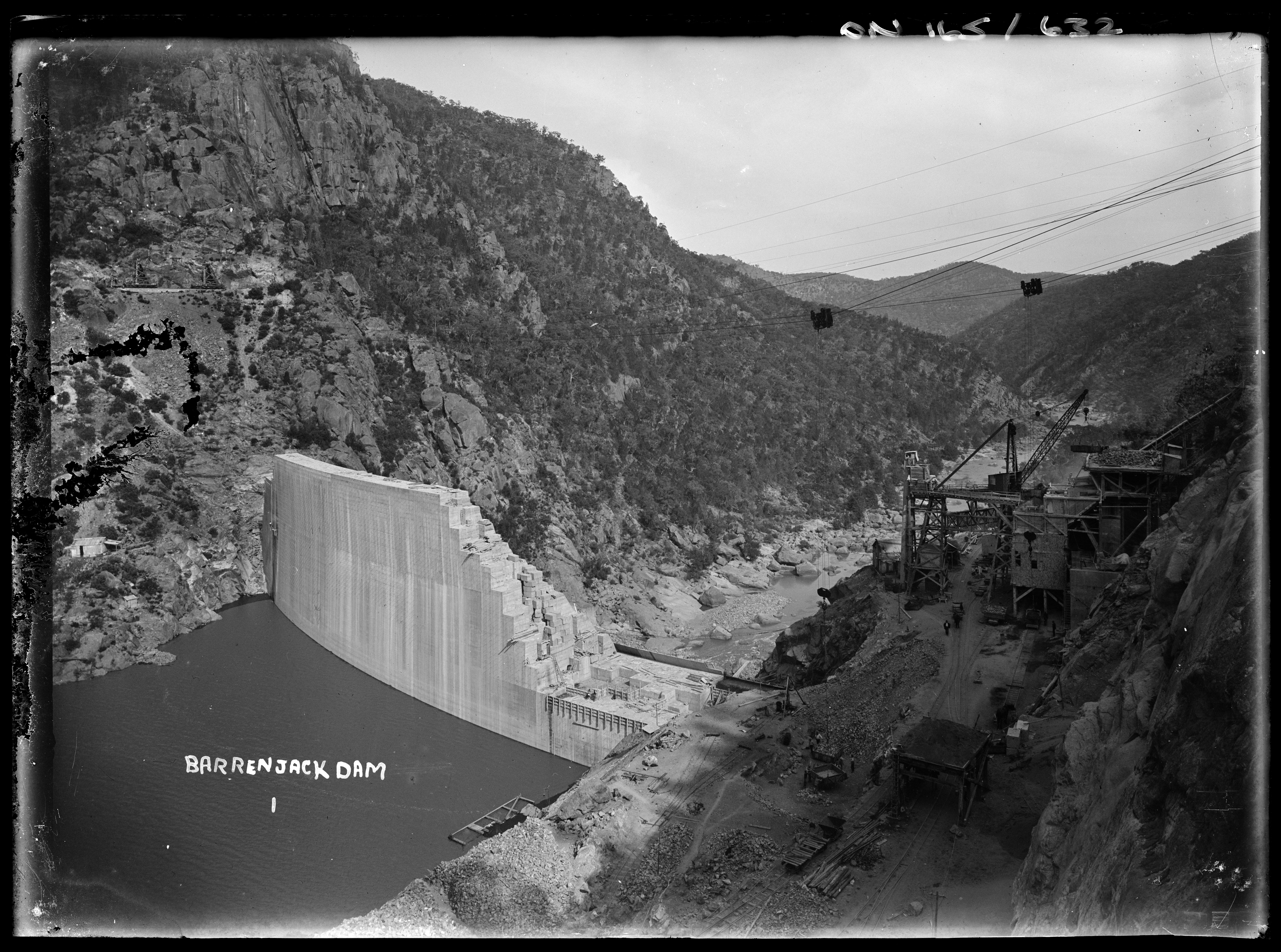
Barrenjack Dam already holding water

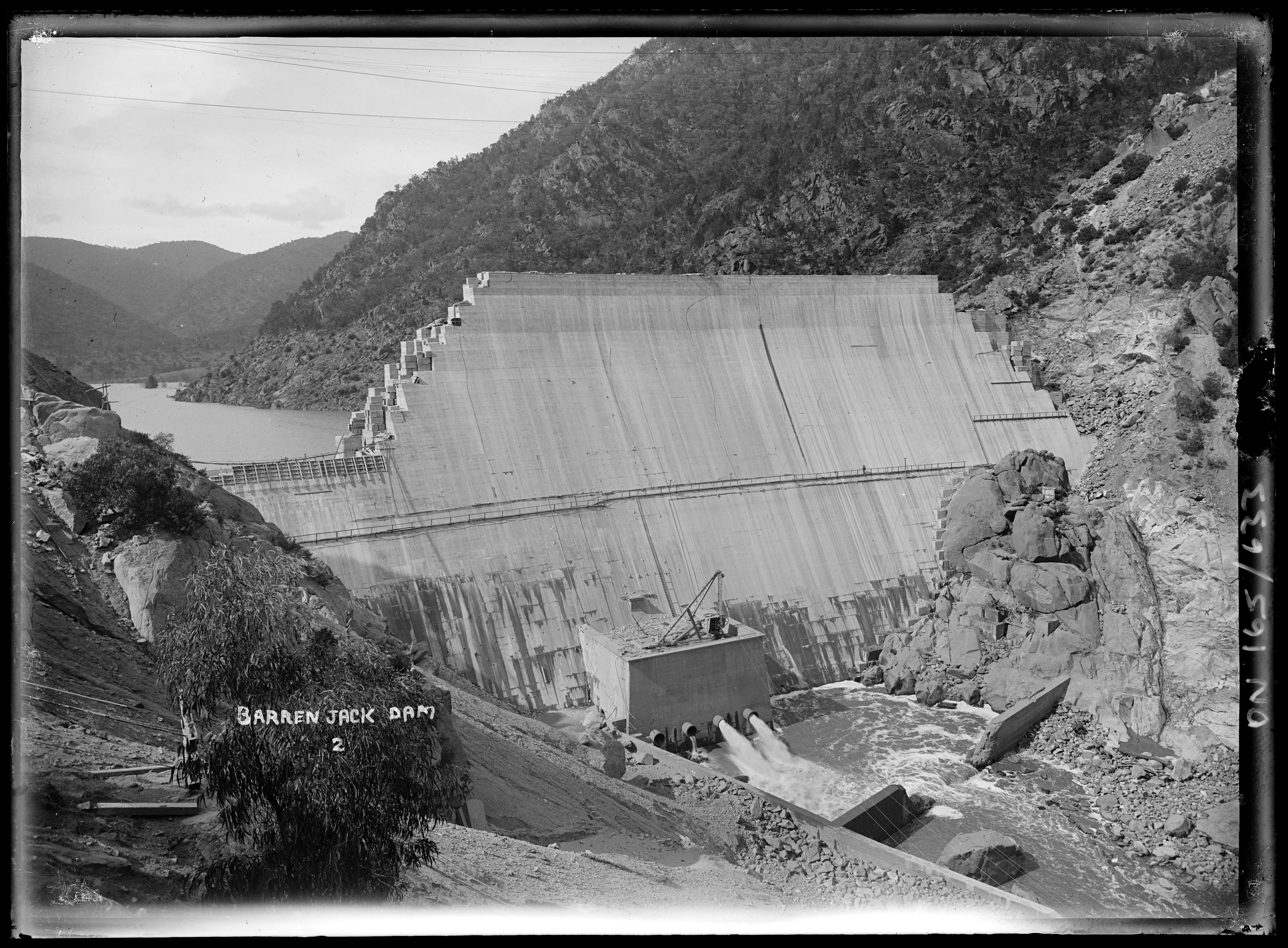
View from lower down and just downstream

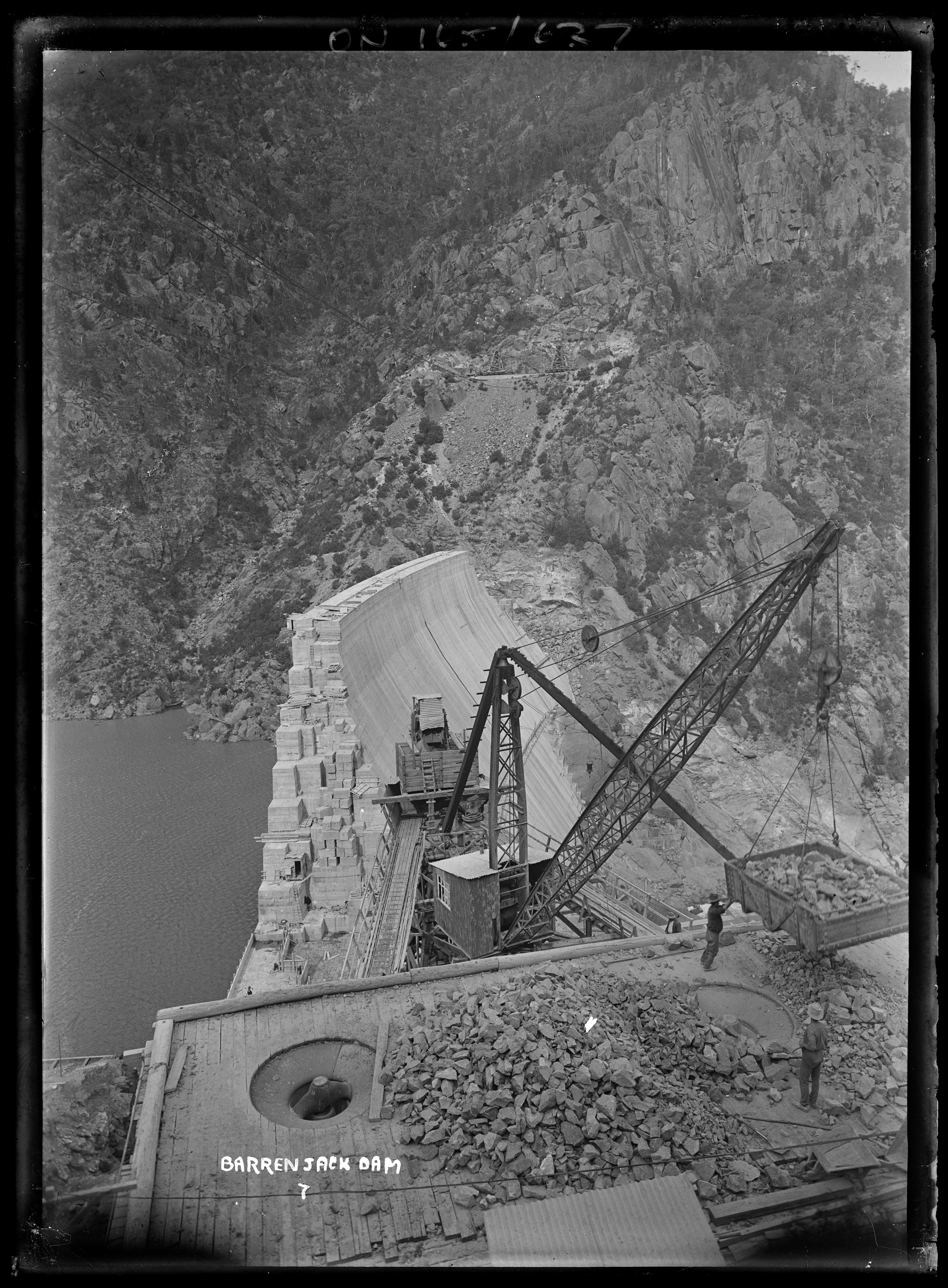
From above wall on (unfinished) north side

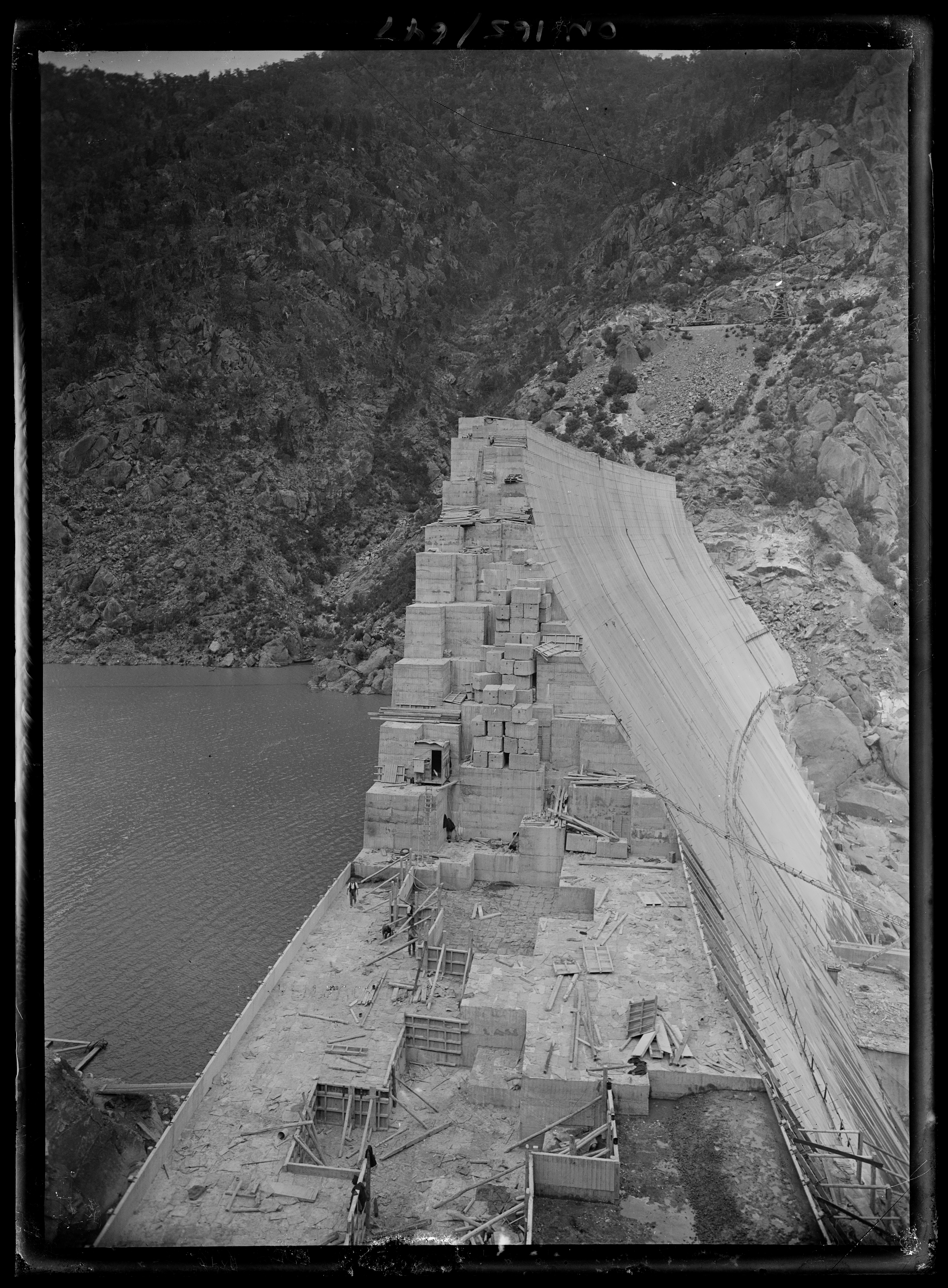
View of Dam from North side, end on to wall (then unfinished at ends)

Flooding in July 1922 filled the reservoir to the record height of 1,178 feet (359 m) above sea level, or 198 feet (60 m) above the bed of the Murrumbidgee River at the dam wall. The flood waters tore through the unfinished southern spillway and fell 200 feet (61 m) to the river below, resulting in a massive fog which one journalist compared to that of Niagara Falls. The flood water came within 2 feet (0.61 m) of spilling into the finished northern spillway, which was being used as a storage site for sand and granite used in the dam's construction. Had the water entered the northern spillway, the construction materials, worth £25,000, would have been swept away.

Another major flood in May 1925 far exceeded all previously recorded floods and resulted in the dam wall being overtopped to a depth of 1 metre (3 ft 3 in).

Due to World War I, the dam was not completed until 1928. At the end of 1927, £1,712,730 had been spent on construction work, excluding the cost of the hydroelectric facilities.

=== Enlargement and remedial works ===
In 1937, it was discovered that the dam had developed a structural weakness that required remedial action. The weakness was not due to a design flaw per se; rather it was due to strains and stresses that were not scientifically understood at the time the dam was designed. The New South Wales Government brought in dam engineering expert Professor P.G. Hornell from Sweden to report on the defects that had developed in the dam.

Apparently there were real fears of the dam wall bursting, so detailed plans were prepared for the evacuation of 20,000 people in the Murrumbidgee basin downstream of the dam in the event that the dam wall failed. The State Government played down these fears and felt that the evacuation plans would never have to be used. In the event of a catastrophic failure of the dam wall, it was anticipated that flood waters would reach Jugiong within an hour, Gundagai within 90 minutes, Wagga Wagga in six hours and Narrandera in 22 hours. Arrangements were made with police, the New South Wales Government Railways, the postal service, military and air force officials, radio stations, boat operators and local committees to be put into effect at a moments' notice.

Remediation work was carried out between 1937 and 1957. The remediation work was authorised by the NSW Cabinet around January 1939, and at the time was anticipated to cost more than £1,000,000. The first stage of remediation works involved lowering the dam wall by 10–15 feet (3.0–4.6 m) and was estimated in 1937 to cost approximately £100,000.

In 1941, the State Government appointed a committee to estimate the probability of the dam flooding. This flood probability was used by consulting engineers to estimate the cost of the remediation work. The engineers estimated the remedial work would cost £1,800,000 but according to Government experts this figure was likely to be substantially exceeded.

In February 1951 a fire destroyed some of the workshops at the construction site. The compressing room, machine shop and first-aid surgery were the worst affected, and much of their contents were destroyed. The damage was estimated to cost between £50,000 and £100,000.

Eventually, the remediation work strengthened and enlarged the dam wall, increased the discharge capacity of the spillways (to about twice the peak discharge of the 1925 flood), and increased the storage capacity of the dam from about 652,000 acre-feet (804,000,000 m^{3}) to 837,000 acre-feet (1.032×10^{9} m^{3}).

A major flood in 1974 eroded unweathered granite from an unlined spillway discharge channel which then resulted in the destruction of a penstock to the Burrinjuck Power Station. The outlet valves of the dam were also destroyed during the same flood. These events prompted a review of the safety of the dam which recommended a new remedial works program.

=== Deaths ===
On Friday 12 September 1924, three men were working on a cutting when some earth fell from higher up the slope. 61-year-old ganger John E. Miller was hit in the legs and thrown to his death down the face of the cutting. An inquest held the following day found that Mr Miller had died of a fractured skull and made a finding of accidental death.

At 8 a.m. on Thursday morning of 19 October 1950, nine men fell to their deaths after a platform collapsed unexpectedly. The men were pulled into the spillway. They were pulling wires to open the southern spillway in order to alleviate floodwaters when the platform they were working from collapsed. Eight of the men's bodies were found. Frank Lloyd Barton's body was found a mile down the river from the dam. The other eight men were Frederick Rule, Frederick Basham, James Chant, James Fillery, Robert Elliott, Reginald Lippiatt, Peter Steinmanis, and Eugene Podusteanu. There was a tenth man, Bruce Grieves, working as well but he survived the accident because he had one leg off the platform and managed to pull back when the platform gave way.

=== Upgrade ===
In response to the 1974 floods, the Burrinjuck Dam Flood Security Upgrading project was undertaken to raise the existing dam wall by 12 metres (39 ft) to its present height of 92 metres (302 ft) and to install post-tensioned ground anchor cables to improve the security of the dam during major floods. At the time, the project was unprecedented in two respects:

1. the post-tensioning force required per metre length of dam crest and,
2. the intensity of the flood discharge over the unlined sections of the side channel spillways during the Probable Maximum Flood.

The upgrading works were completed in 1999 at a cost of A$79.5 million.

=== Privatisation ===
Prior to August 2013, The dam was owned by the State Government through the Department of Planning and Infrastructure and its predecessors. When the government began privatisation of electricity generation, Burrinjuck Dam was one of several renewable energy assets that were not immediately sold, but instead transferred to a State-owned corporation, Green State Power.

In March 2018 Meridian Energy Australia purchased Green State Power's hydro-electric assets which included the Hume, Burrinjuck and Keepit Power Stations. In October 2019 Meridian announced a proposal to increase station capacity by 50 megawatts.

== Climate ==
Located on the exposed western slopes of the Brindabella Range, rainfall peaks distinctly in winter. While snow is a rare occurrence at the bottom of the valley, it does occur annually on the surrounding ranges and hilly country above 700 metres (such as at Wee Jasper); nearby Black Andrew Mountain (935 metres) and Mount Barren Jack (972 metres) overlooking the lake, can be periodically snow-capped during the winter months.

Climate data for Burrinjuck Dam (1908–2023, extremes 1965–2023); 390 m AMSL; 35.00° S, 148.60° E
Month	Jan	Feb	Mar	Apr	May	Jun	Jul	Aug	Sep	Oct	Nov	Dec	Year
Record high °C (°F)	45.6 (114.1)	44.3 (111.7)	39.0 (102.2)	34.0 (93.2)	29.0 (84.2)	21.5 (70.7)	20.6 (69.1)	24.5 (76.1)	30.0 (86.0)	34.0 (93.2)	39.5 (103.1)	42.1 (107.8)	45.6 (114.1)
Mean daily maximum °C (°F)	29.8 (85.6)	29.0 (84.2)	26.1 (79.0)	21.1 (70.0)	16.2 (61.2)	12.5 (54.5)	11.7 (53.1)	13.5 (56.3)	16.9 (62.4)	20.5 (68.9)	24.0 (75.2)	27.7 (81.9)	20.7 (69.4)
Mean daily minimum °C (°F)	15.6 (60.1)	15.7 (60.3)	13.4 (56.1)	9.6 (49.3)	6.4 (43.5)	4.2 (39.6)	3.0 (37.4)	3.7 (38.7)	5.6 (42.1)	8.4 (47.1)	11.1 (52.0)	13.7 (56.7)	9.2 (48.6)
Record low °C (°F)	5.9 (42.6)	7.0 (44.6)	3.1 (37.6)	0.9 (33.6)	−0.7 (30.7)	−3.8 (25.2)	−7.0 (19.4)	−4.0 (24.8)	−6.1 (21.0)	0.5 (32.9)	2.6 (36.7)	4.7 (40.5)	−7.0 (19.4)
Average precipitation mm (inches)	63.1 (2.48)	56.1 (2.21)	62.5 (2.46)	64.7 (2.55)	79.8 (3.14)	96.0 (3.78)	100.1 (3.94)	97.7 (3.85)	83.4 (3.28)	85.5 (3.37)	74.3 (2.93)	63.1 (2.48)	926.6 (36.48)
Average precipitation days (≥ 0.2 mm)	6.5	5.7	6.3	6.9	9.3	12.0	13.2	13.4	10.9	10.3	8.6	7.4	110.5
Source: Australian Bureau of Meteorology; Burrinjuck Dam

Climate data for Billapaloola State Forest (1938–1969); 808 m AMSL; 35.27° S, 148.38° E
Month	Jan	Feb	Mar	Apr	May	Jun	Jul	Aug	Sep	Oct	Nov	Dec	Year
Mean daily maximum °C (°F)	26.6 (79.9)	25.6 (78.1)	23.1 (73.6)	17.1 (62.8)	12.6 (54.7)	9.3 (48.7)	8.4 (47.1)	9.8 (49.6)	13.8 (56.8)	16.6 (61.9)	20.0 (68.0)	24.3 (75.7)	17.3 (63.1)
Mean daily minimum °C (°F)	12.1 (53.8)	11.8 (53.2)	9.8 (49.6)	5.8 (42.4)	3.2 (37.8)	1.2 (34.2)	0.1 (32.2)	0.5 (32.9)	2.4 (36.3)	4.8 (40.6)	7.2 (45.0)	10.0 (50.0)	5.7 (42.3)
Average precipitation mm (inches)	86.9 (3.42)	71.4 (2.81)	98.8 (3.89)	113.7 (4.48)	163.4 (6.43)	156.1 (6.15)	172.6 (6.80)	162.9 (6.41)	132.6 (5.22)	145.0 (5.71)	120.1 (4.73)	86.5 (3.41)	1,516.8 (59.72)
Average precipitation days (≥ 0.2 mm)	5.8	5.6	6.1	7.9	10.9	12.3	13.4	13.6	10.3	11.1	8.7	7.0	112.7
Source: Australian Bureau of Meteorology; Billapaloola State Forest

== Description ==
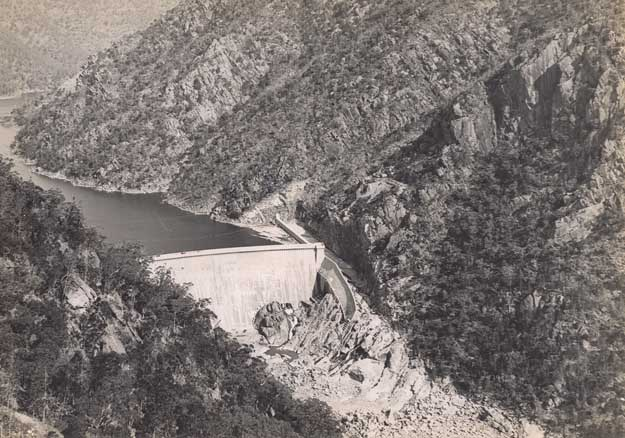
Dam wall

Journalist E.J. Brady visited the dam site during its construction in 1911 and wrote a detailed description of its progress to that point. He alighted from the southern mail train at Goondah railway station where he was met by the resident engineer on the project, Mr Smith. They then boarded a train on the light rail line which took them 45 kilometres to the temporary township housing 1,000 people, the workers and their families, engaged in constructing the dam. The workforce itself was 400 strong and the monthly wages bill was £3,000. No alcohol was allowed in the township. The dam was expected to take another three years to complete.

Burrinjuck Dam is situated on the Murrumbidgee River 60 km by road from Yass in southern New South Wales. The dam is part of a larger system of weirs and controls which include that of Blowering Dam and Berembed Weir. Burrinjuck Dam provides water supplies for the Murrumbidgee Irrigation Area which has a combination of licensed agricultural, irrigation and stock use, with also town and domestic users. Apart from acting in a regulatory role the dam can also pass water through its 10 megawatt hydro-electric power station thus becoming a very fast and clean supply of electricity.

The dam is a steel reinforced cyclopean concrete gravitation dam. Large rocks known as granite plums were mixed with cyclopean concrete during construction as a cost saving measure. The dam wall constructed with 394 cubic metres (13,900 cu ft) of concrete is 91 metres (299 ft) high and 233 metres (764 ft) long. The maximum water depth is 61 metres (200 ft) and at 100% capacity the dam wall holds back 1,028,000 megalitres (36,300×10^{6} cu ft) of water at 361 metres (1,184 ft) AHD. The surface area of the Lake Burrinjuck Reservoir is 5,500 hectares (14,000 acres) and the catchment area is 12,953 square kilometres (5,001 sq mi). The three sector gates plus two side channel spillways are capable of discharging 29,100 cubic metres per second (1,030,000 cu ft/s).

Linked to the dam is a pump house, left and right spillways and a hydro electric power generation system.

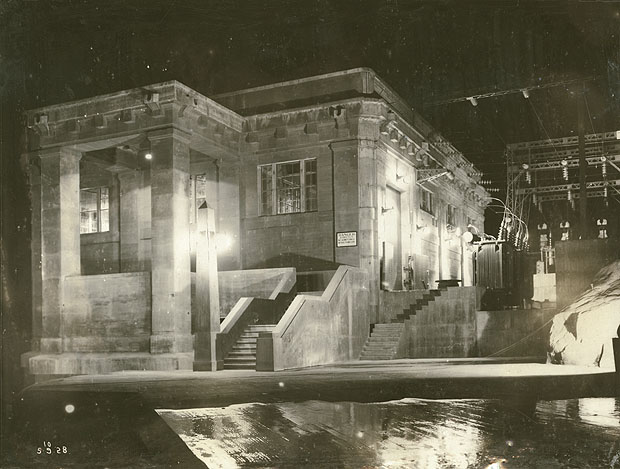
Power station, 1928

=== Power generation ===
The dam houses a hydroelectric power station and has three operational turbine generators, with a generating capacity of 28 MW of electricity; with a net generation of 24.5 gigawatt-hours (88 TJ) per annum.

== Ecological impact ==
The unnaturally cold water released from the dam, up to 10 °C (18 °F) colder than it naturally should be, is believed to have directly contributed to the disappearance of the freshwater catfish from the Murrumbidgee between Burrinjuck and Wagga Wagga.

== Heritage status ==
The dam is an example of how applied modern technology has been used to meet the demand of an expanding rural area. The dam was part of a larger system of weirs and controls providing water for the government-sponsored Murrumbidgee Irrigation Scheme which enabled agriculture to expand in the area. It is the first major water storage built specially for irrigation purposes in NSW. The dam is also part of the New South Wales's first hydro-electric scheme.

It is listed as a National Engineering Landmark by Engineers Australia as part of the Engineering Heritage Recognition Program.

== See also ==
- Greater Burrinjuck Dam Site
- Barren Jack Creek Water Supply Dam
- List of dams and reservoirs in Australia § New South Wales
- Mahkoolma - one of the proposed sites for Australia's national capital.
