= History of the Australian Capital Territory =

The history of the Australian Capital Territory (ACT) as a separate administrative division began in 1911, when the land that would comprise the Territory was transferred from New South Wales to the Australian federal government. The territory contains Australia's capital city Canberra and various smaller settlements. Until 1989, it also administered the Jervis Bay Territory, a small coastal region.

Indigenous Australians have lived in the present-day ACT for at least 20,000 years. The area formed the traditional lands of the Ngambri people and several other linguistic groups. It was incorporated into the Colony of New South Wales with British settlement in 1788, but no white person reached the area until Joseph Wild in 1820. In 1824, Joshua Moore built a homestead named Canberry, whose name was derived from a local Aboriginal language; its meaning is disputed. Further homesteads and stations were established over the course of the 19th century. These were initially large properties used for sheep and cattle grazing, but they were later broken up and subdivided into smaller farms and urban settlements. The oldest gazetted settlement in the ACT is Tharwa, which was proclaimed in 1862.

The Constitution of Australia – which took effect on 1 January 1901 – provided that a new national capital should be built at a site determined by Federal Parliament; (Melbourne served as the temporary capital). It had to be within the state of New South Wales, but at least 100 miles (160 km) away from Sydney. The Seat of Government Act 1908 fixed Canberra as the site of the new capital, and the surrounding region was formally ceded to the federal government on 1 January 1911. It was originally known as the Federal Capital Territory (FCT), adopting its current name in 1938. American architect Walter Burley Griffin won the competition to design the new city, and was appointed to oversee its construction. He was dogged by disputes with the government and the onset of World War I, and was fired in 1921. Multiple planning bodies were established but achieved little, in part due to the Great Depression.

Parliament moved to Canberra in 1927, although government offices were slow to follow. The growth of Canberra and the ACT was slow, with potential residents discouraged by the cold winter climate and lack of facilities. Development accelerated after World War II, championed by Prime Minister Robert Menzies who regarded the state of the capital as an embarrassment. The National Capital Development Commission was created in 1957 with more power than its predecessors. It ended four decades of disputes over the shape and design of Lake Burley Griffin, the centrepiece of Canberra, with construction completed in 1964. This prompted the development of the Parliamentary Triangle, a core part of Griffin's design, and followed various buildings of national importance were constructed on the lakefront. On average, the population of Canberra increased by more than 50% every five years between 1955 and 1975. More residential land was released through the creation of new town centres in the 1960s and 1970s.

An elective Advisory Council was created for the ACT in 1930. It was replaced by a House of Assembly in 1974. Full self-government was granted in 1988, with the Legislative Assembly electing the Chief Minister of the Australian Capital Territory to serve as the territory's head of government. The assembly has most of the powers and responsibilities of state governments, but its actions are subject to a federal veto. The ACT gained a seat in the House of Representatives in 1949, initially with limited voting rights. It has had multiple members since 1974, and since 1975 has also elected two members of the Senate.

== Indigenous prehistory ==
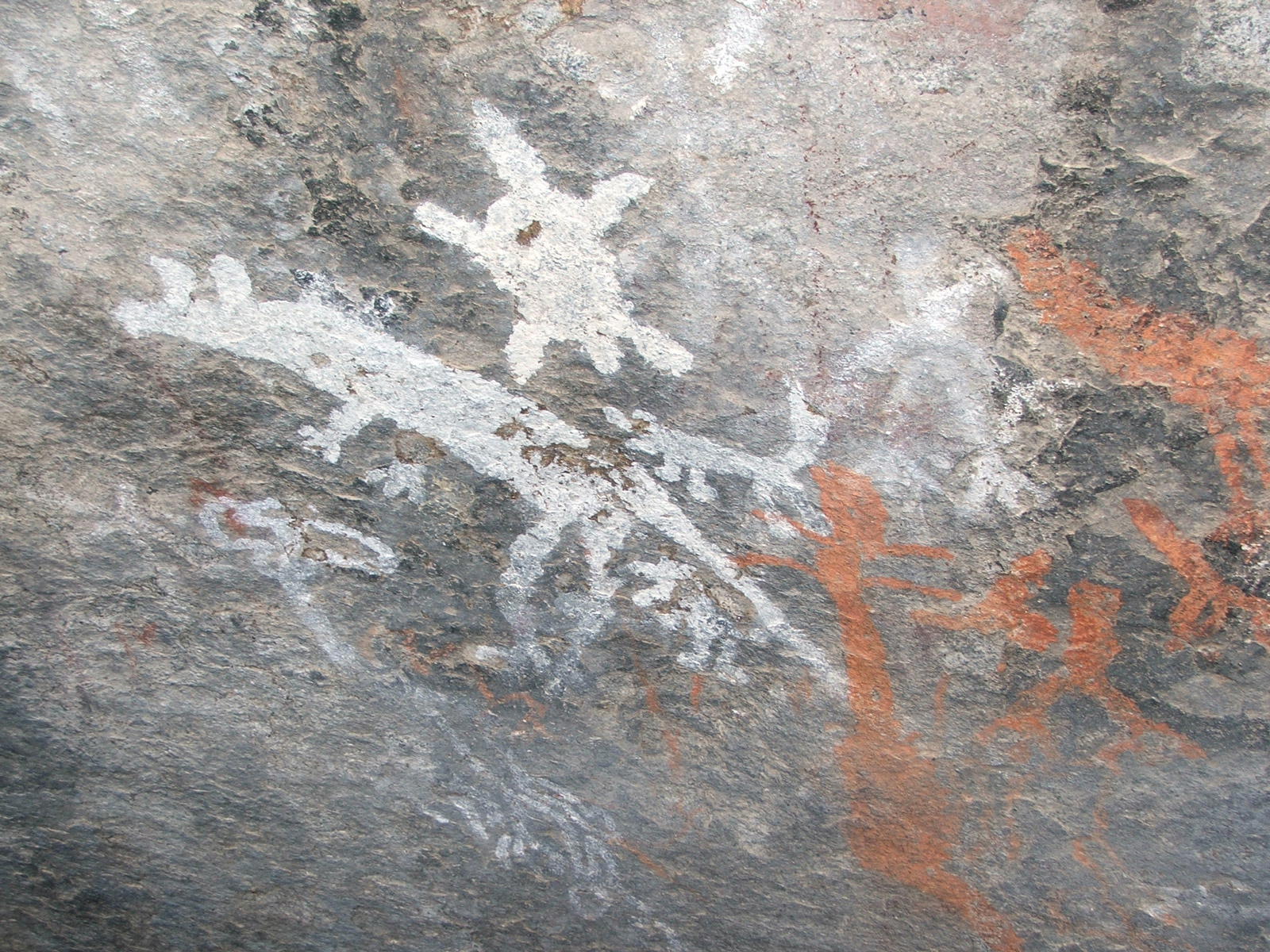
Cave artwork from Yankee Hat Mountain featuring a kangaroo, dingos, emus, humans and an echidna or turtle

Indigenous Australian peoples have long inhabited what is now the ACT. Anthropologist Norman Tindale has suggested the principal group occupying the region were the Ngunnawal people, while the Ngarigo and Walgalu lived immediately to the south, the Wandandian to the east, the Gandangara to the north, and the Wiradjuri to the north-west.

Archaeological evidence from the Birrigai rock shelter in Tidbinbilla Nature Reserve indicates habitation dating back at least 21,000 years. It is possible that the area was inhabited for considerably longer, with evidence of an Aboriginal presence in south-western New South Wales dating back around 40,000–62,000 years. Another site of significance in the reserve is the Bogong Rocks shelter, which contains the oldest evidence of Aboriginal occupation at a bogong moth resting site. These insects were an important source of food for the Aboriginal peoples of the Southern Alps and would accumulate by the thousands in caves and rock crevices, where they were collected and later roasted in sand or ashes, and then eaten whole.

Numerous other culturally significant and archaeologically notable sites are known across the territory, including shelters, rock art sites, stone artefact scatters, scarred trees and chert quarries. Tidbinbilla Mountain is believed to have long been used for Aboriginal initiation ceremonies.

== 19th-century exploration ==
Following European settlement, the growth of the new colony of New South Wales led to an increasing demand for arable land. Governor Lachlan Macquarie supported expeditions to open up new lands to the south of the capital Sydney, including one to find an overland route to Jervis Bay, an area which would later be incorporated into the ACT as its only coastal possession. In 1818 Charles Throsby, Hamilton Hume, James Meehan and William Kearns set out to find the route, a task accomplished that same year by Throsby and Kearns.

The 1820s saw further exploration in the Canberra area associated with the construction of a road from Sydney to the Goulburn plains, supervised by Throsby and his overseer, Joseph Wild. While working on the project, Throsby learned of a nearby lake and river from the local Aborigines, and he accordingly sent Wild to lead a small party to investigate the site. On 19 August 1820, Wild ventured off from his two companions, and later that day arrived at the north shore of what is now known as Lake George. In October 1820 Governor Macquarie visited the site, and while he was in attendance Throsby decided to push on to reach the river of which he had been informed. Accompanied by Wild and James Vaughan, he journeyed south in search of the Murrumbidgee. The search was unsuccessful, but they did discover the Yass River, and it is surmised that they would have set foot on part of the future ACT.

A second expedition was mounted shortly thereafter, and Throsby's nephew Charles Throsby Smith, Wild and Vaughan further explored the Molonglo (Ngambri) and Queanbeyan (Jullergung) Rivers, becoming the first Europeans to camp at the site. However, they failed to find the Murrumbidgee, and Smith declared that the river did not exist. The issue of the Murrumbidgee was solved in 1821, when Charles Throsby mounted a third expedition and successfully reached the watercourse, on the way providing the first detailed account of the land where Canberra now resides.

The next significant expedition to the region came in 1823, when Wild was employed by Brigade Major John Ovens and Captain Mark Currie to guide them to the Murrumbidgee. They travelled south along the river and named the area now known as Tuggeranong Isabella's Plain, after Isabella Maria Brisbane (1821–1849), the two-year-old daughter of Thomas Brisbane, the then Governor of New South Wales. Unable to cross the river near the current site of Tharwa, they continued on to the Monaro Plains. The last expedition in the region prior to settlement was undertaken by Allan Cunningham in 1824. He reported that the region was suitable for grazing, and the settlement of the Limestone Plains followed immediately thereafter.

== Early settlement ==
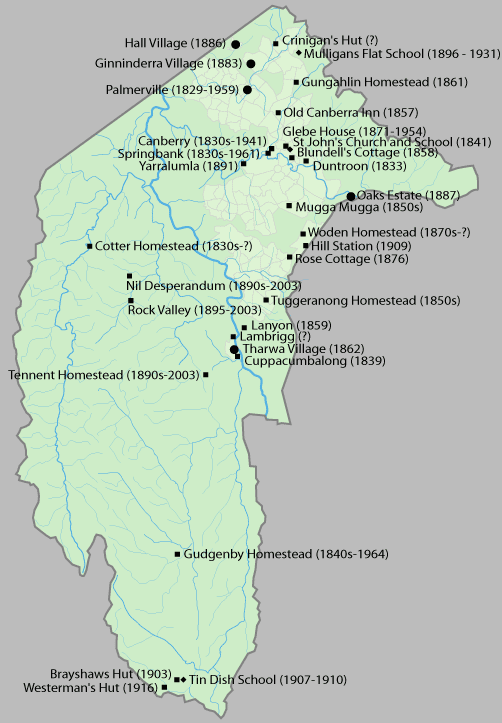
Significant homesteads, structures and settlements in the ACT prior to 1909

When the boundaries for settlement of New South Wales were determined, the Limestone Plains were opened up to settlers. The first land grant in the region was made to Joshua John Moore in 1823, and settlement in the area began in 1824 with the construction of a homestead by his stockmen on what is now the Acton Peninsula. Moore formally purchased the site in 1826 and named the property Canberry, or Canberra, although he never visited it. His 4 km^{2} (1.5 sq mi) claim covered much of the future North Canberra.

Adjacent to the eastern boundary on Moore's claim was the settlement of Duntroon, occupied by James Ainslie on behalf of Robert Campbell. John Palmer was granted land in the region, which was taken up by his son George in 1826. He established Palmerville near Ginninderra Creek in 1829, and the "Squire" at Gungahlin was completed in 1861. Palmerville in the Ginninderra district was the site of the first school in the region, and operated from 1844 to 1848. The first school in the future Canberra opened on the Duntroon Estate, next door to St John's Church in what would become the suburb of Reid in the 20th century. Canberra's first church, St John's, was consecrated and opened for use in 1845.

The Tuggeranong Plains, situated 10 km (6.2 mi) south of the Molonglo River, were first settled in 1827 by Peter Murdoch. The Waniassa Homestead (also known as Tuggeranong Homestead) was established in 1836 by Thomas McQuoid, and the first buildings of the Lanyon estate, owned by John Lanyon and James Wright, were built in 1838. Tharwa was settled in 1834; the homestead in this area was Cuppacumbalong, established by James Wright in 1839. Tharwa is the oldest official settlement in the ACT, having been proclaimed in 1862.

Settlers moved further south into what is now the Namadgi National Park. William Herbert made a claim over part of the Orroral Valley at some point between 1826 and 1836, while during the 1830s Garrett Cotter inhabited what would later be named the Cotter River Valley, in his honour. From the late 1830s, the Boboyan Homestead and station were established. Gudgenby was settled in the early 1840s and the Gudgenby Homestead was erected around this time. By 1848 most of the major valleys of the Namadgi area had been settled.

Convict labour was widely used in the region, and the first bushrangers in the area were runaway convicts. John Tennant, the earliest and best-known bushranger of the region, lived in a hideout on what is now known as Mount Tennant, behind Tharwa. From 1827 he raided the local homesteads, stealing stock, food and possessions until his arrest in 1828; he was later hung in Sydney for his crimes. The lawlessness of the region led to the appointment of the first resident magistrate on 28 November 1837 – Allured Tasker Faunce, who was also known as "Ironman Faunce" since his time as a magistrate at Brisbane Water. The magistrate oversaw legal matters and issued liquor licences to several establishments, the first being the Elmsall Inn on the Duntroon estate in 1841.

A significant influx of population and economic activity occurred around the 1850s goldrushes, particularly the Kiandra rush of 1859–60. The goldrushes prompted the establishment of communication between Sydney and the region by way of the Cobb & Co coaches, which transported mail and passengers. The first post offices opened in Ginninderra in 1859 and at Lanyon the following year. Bushranger activity continued with the goldrushes: Australian-born bandits Ben Hall and the Clarke brothers were active in the area, targeting mail coaches and gold transportation.

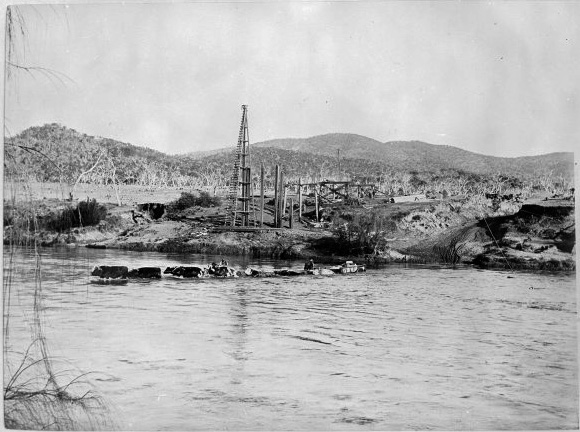
Construction of Tharwa Bridge in 1893. The bridge, the oldest in the ACT, crosses the Murrumbidgee River in the east-central part of the territory.

Terence Aubrey Murray was born in Ireland in 1810 and came to Sydney with his father, a retired redcoat army officer, and siblings in 1827. In 1837, he acquired the Yarralumla sheep station, taking up residence in Yarralumla's Georgian-style homestead, which he extended. He was elected unopposed to represent the surrounding counties of Murray, King and Georgiana in the first partially elective Legislative Council in 1843. With the establishment of responsible government in 1856, Murray became a member of the first Legislative Assembly, representing the electorate of Southern Boroughs – which included nearby Queanbeyan – and in 1859 he was elected to represent Argyle – which included another of his pastoral properties, Winderradeen, in the Collector area, north of Canberra.

The Robertson Land Acts and the Closer Settlement Acts altered the mechanism for granting land tenure and precipitated the break-up of large properties in New South Wales. During the 1860s, in the wake of the new government legislation, small farmers nicknamed "selectors" moved into what would become the ACT, taking up parcels of (usually inferior) land which existed between the estates of the wealthy, established landholders.

During colonial times, prior to the establishment of the ACT, the European communities of Ginninderra, Molonglo and Tuggeranong settled in and farmed the surrounding land, raising sheep in the main but also breeding horses and growing grain. The region was also called the Queanbeyan/Yass district, after the two largest towns in the area. The villages of Ginninderra and Tharwa developed to service the local agrarian communities. In 1882, the first allotments in the village of Hall – named after early pastoralist Henry Hall – were sold. By 1901, it was an established town with a hotel, coachbuilder, blacksmith, butcher, shoemaker, saddler, dairy and two stores.

In 1886, the agronomist William Farrer, established the research farm 'Lambrigg' on the banks of the Murrumbidgee south of present-day Tuggeranong. Farrer experimented with rust and drought-resistant wheat; the varieties he bred were widely used by Australian growers, and he was later credited with establishing Australia as a major producer. Tharwa Bridge, the oldest surviving bridge in the region, was opened in 1895 and was the first crossing over the Murrumbidgee River. By 1911, when the region came under federal control, the population had grown to 1,714 settlers.

== Relations with indigenous people ==
During the first 20 years of settlement, there was only limited contact between the settlers and Aboriginal people. Joseph Franklin purchased land in the Brindabellas in 1849 and attempted to set up a cattle farm. His livestock were slaughtered by the local Aboriginal people and he was driven back out of the mountains. The rush of prospectors into the Kiandra area through the Brindabellas and the mountains to the west of the ACT as a result of the Kiandra goldrush led to conflict with the Aboriginal people. By the time Franklin returned to the Brindabellas in 1863, the indigenous population had been significantly reduced.

Over the succeeding years, the Ngunnawal and other local indigenous people effectively ceased to exist as cohesive and independent communities adhering to their traditional ways of life. Those who had not succumbed to disease and other predations either dispersed to the local settlements or were relocated to more distant Aboriginal reserves set up by the New South Wales government in the latter part of the 19th century. The children of mixed European-Aboriginal families were generally expected to assimilate into the settlement communities. The Ngunnawal people were subsequently often considered to be "extinct"; however, in a situation parallel to that of the Tasmanian Aborigines, people with claims to Ngunnawal ancestry continue to identify themselves as such. However, there have been contemporary instances of dispute within the community itself over who is properly considered to be a member of the Ngunnawal people.

== Search for a capital city location ==
The district's change from a New South Wales rural area to the national capital began with the debates over Federation during the 19th century. Prior to 1840 Sydney was the administrative centre for the colony, and thus it could be presupposed that any potential federal government would be seated there. However, this started to change when, buoyed by the Victorian Gold Rush, Melbourne grew rapidly, and by 1860 its population had overtaken that of Sydney. The discovery of gold also helped to increase Melbourne's financial base, to the point where at one stage "nearly 5% of all British imperial government revenue ... passed through [Melbourne's] port". Thus Melbourne soon possessed both the size and the economic clout to rival Sydney and to command additional administrative powers.

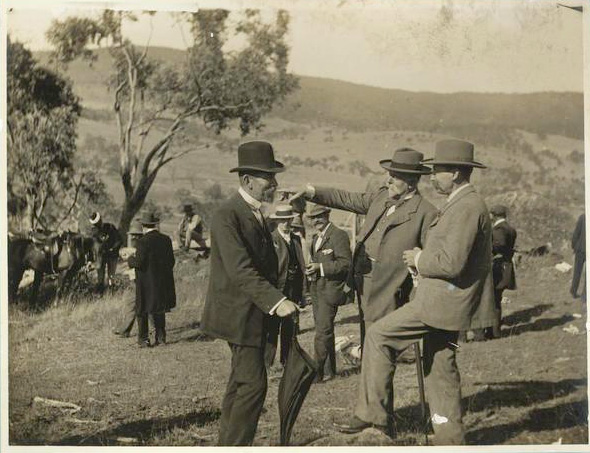
Senators inspecting a possible site for the new capital at Tumut, New South Wales. The final location of the ACT would be 50 km (31.1 mi) to the east, at Yass-Canberra.

When Federation was first being discussed, views differed about the location of the capital. Early advocate for Australian federation, John Dunmore Lang, backed Sydney, but Henry Parkes, a prominent New South Wales politician and Premier, proposed the capital be founded on "neutral ground", nominating the town of Albury as a location. (Albury was located in New South Wales, yet its position on the Murray River placed it on the border between New South Wales and Victoria).

In 1898, a referendum on a proposed Constitution was held in four of the colonies – New South Wales, Victoria, South Australia and Tasmania. Although the referendum achieved a majority in all four colonies, the New South Wales referendum failed to gain the minimum number of votes needed for the bill to pass. Following this result, a meeting of the four Premiers in 1898 heard from George Reid, the Premier of New South Wales, who argued that locating the future capital in New South Wales would be sufficient to ensure the passage of the Bill. This was accepted by the other three Premiers, and the proposed Australian Constitution was modified so that Section 125 specified that the national capital must be "within the state of New South Wales". However, they also added the condition that it must be situated no less than 100 mi (160.9 km) from Sydney. In addition, if the bill passed, Melbourne would be the interim seat of government (but not referred to as the "capital") until a location for the new capital had been determined. The 1899 referendum on this revised bill was successful, passing with sufficient numbers.

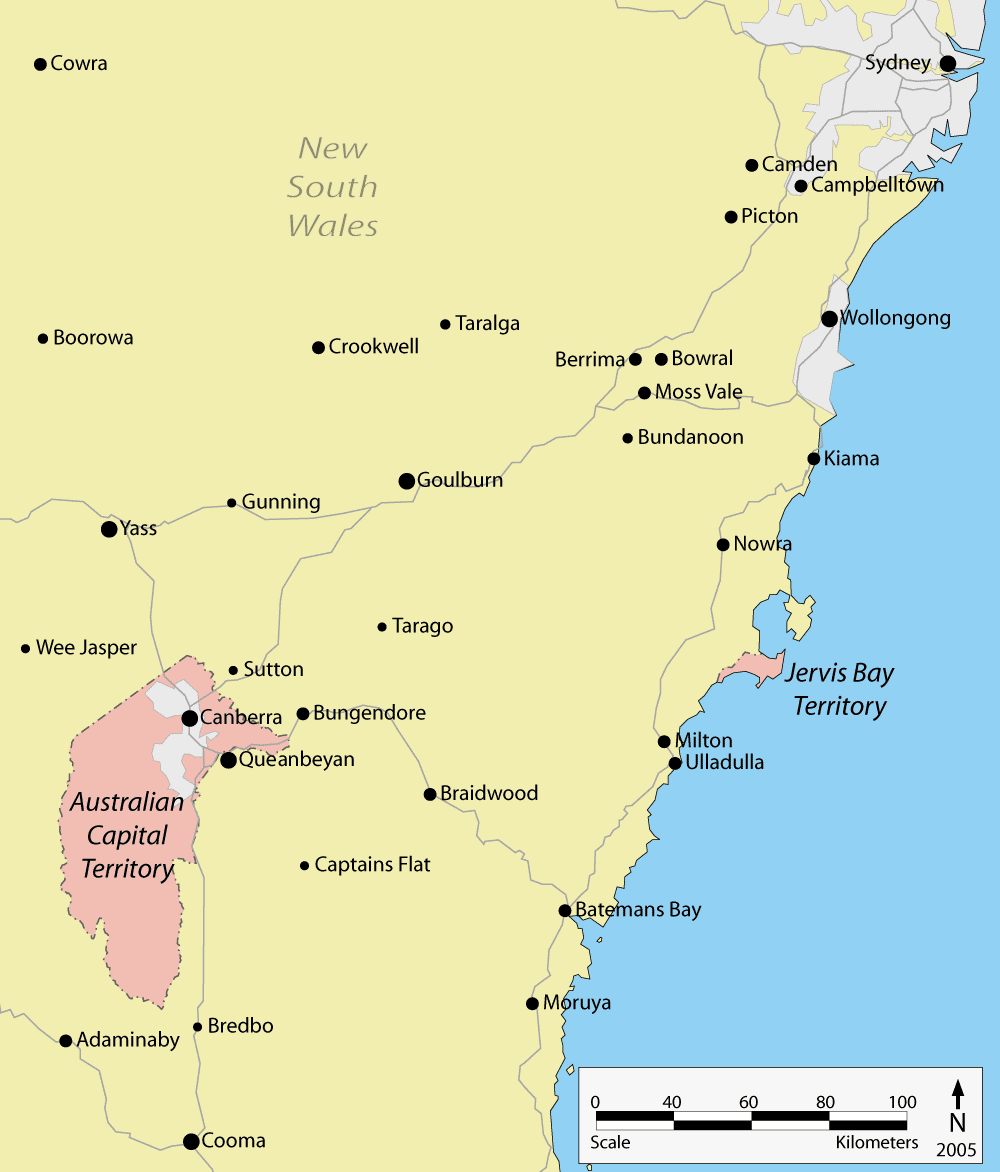
Location of the ACT and Jervis Bay compared to Sydney

Nevertheless, this left open the question of where to locate the capital. Initially the Bombala district in the far south of New South Wales was proposed, to which southern Monaro, (which incorporated Bombala), Orange and Yass were soon added. The New South Wales Premier, John See, offered to provide any of the three recommended sites as a future capital territory. Edmund Barton, the first Prime Minister of the new Federal Government, added another four sites to this list: Albury, Tamworth, Armidale and Tumut, and members of the new government toured the various sites in 1902. The tour proved inconclusive, and upon their return the members decided to refer the problem to a Royal Commission, with the Minister for Home Affairs, William Lyne, pushing for Tumut or Albury as he preferred a site in his electorate. Subsequently, the Commission presented its report to Parliament in 1903, recommending the sites of Albury, Tumut and Orange, in that order. However, there continued to be problems, as the House of Representatives backed the Tumut option, while the Senate preferred the town of Bombala. As a result of this disagreement the bill lapsed, and it was left to the second Parliament to choose a location for the capital.

Location of each site within New South Wales. The 100-mile (160 km) exclusion zone around Sydney is indicated by a red circle.

The new Parliament met in 1904 and reached a compromise, choosing Dalgety, which, like Bombala, was located in the Monaro region. Thus, with the passage of the Seat of Government Act 1904, it appeared that the matter had been settled. However, while the Federal Parliament supported Dalgety, the New South Wales government did not, and they proved unwilling to cede the amount of territory the Federal Government demanded.

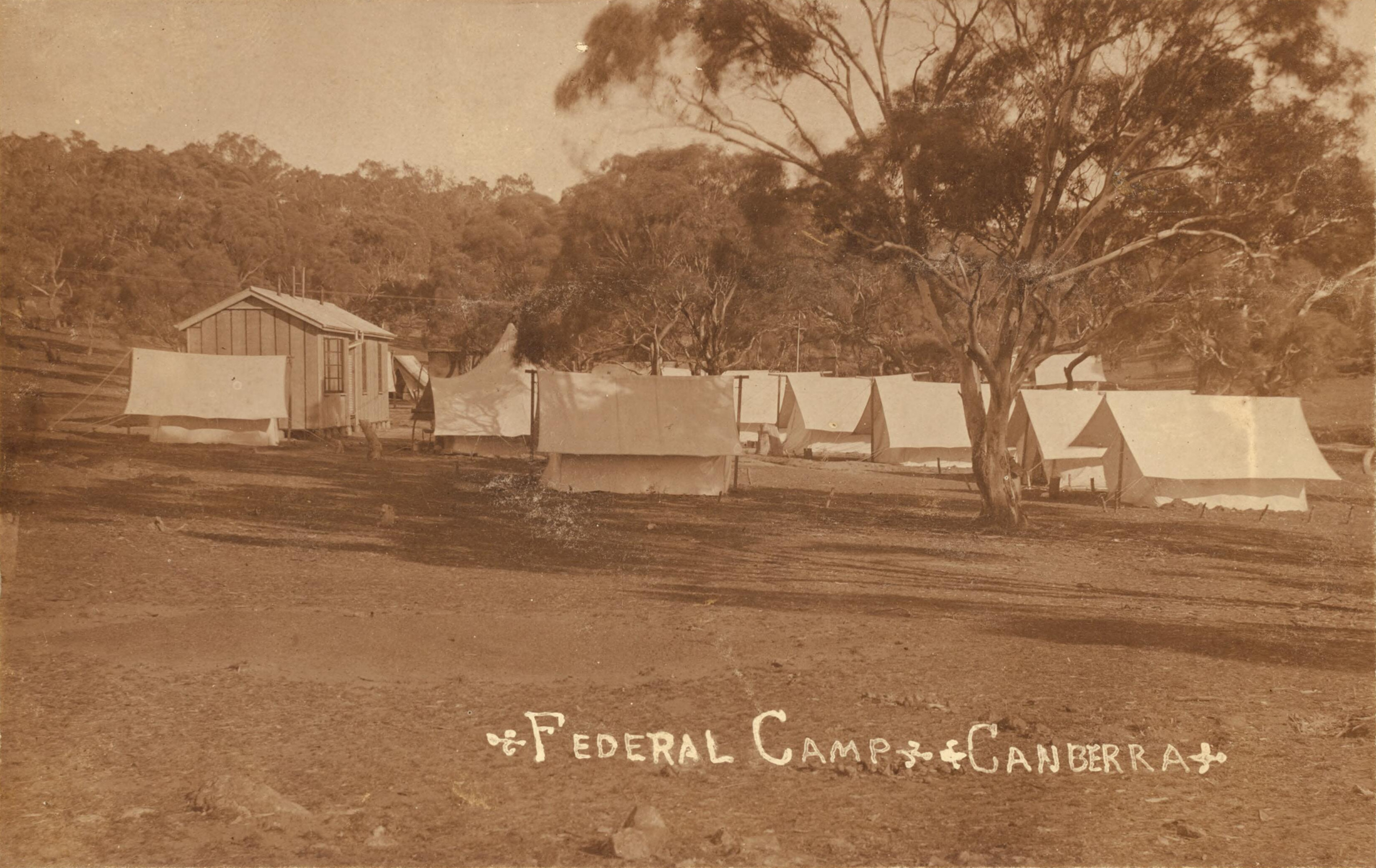
The Federal Capital survey camp was established c. 1909. An extensive survey of the ACT was completed by Charles Scrivener and his team in 1915.

Finally, in 1906, New South Wales agreed to cede sufficient land, but on the condition that it was in the Yass-Canberra region, this site being closer to Sydney. Following a tour of the region by several Senators and Members of the Commonwealth Parliament, in 1908 a new ballot was called in the Federal Parliament with eleven sites nominated. Initially, Dalgety remained at the forefront, but by the eighth round Yass-Canberra had emerged as a new leader, and the site was confirmed in the ninth round of voting. Thus was passed the new Seat of Government Act 1908, which repealed the 1904 Act and specified a capital in the Yass-Canberra region.

Results of the 8 October 1908 House of Representatives ballot
Site	Distance from Sydney	Ballot								
Site	Distance from Sydney	1st	2nd	3rd	4th	5th	6th	7th	8th	9th
Dalgety	452 km	27	26	28	28	27	27	24	27	33
Yass-Canberra	248 km	19	22	23	21	22	22	24	31	39
Tooma	514 km	4	3	5	7	9	9	13	14	
Lyndhurst	269 km	6	8	7	8	8	8	8		
Armidale	485 km	7	5	5	5	5	5			
Tumut	411 km	3	4	3	2	2				
Canberra	248 km	1	1	1	1					
Bombala	485 km	1	1							
Albury	554 km	2								
Orange	254 km	2								
Total		72	70	72	72	73	71	69	72	72
Abstention		2	4	2	2	1	3	4	2	2
Absent		1	1	1	1	1	1	1	1	1

Government Surveyor Charles Scrivener was deployed to the region in the same year in order to map out a specific site and, after an extensive search, settled upon the present location, about 300 km (186.4 mi) south-west of Sydney in the foothills of the Australian Alps.

== Establishment of the Territory in law (1910) ==
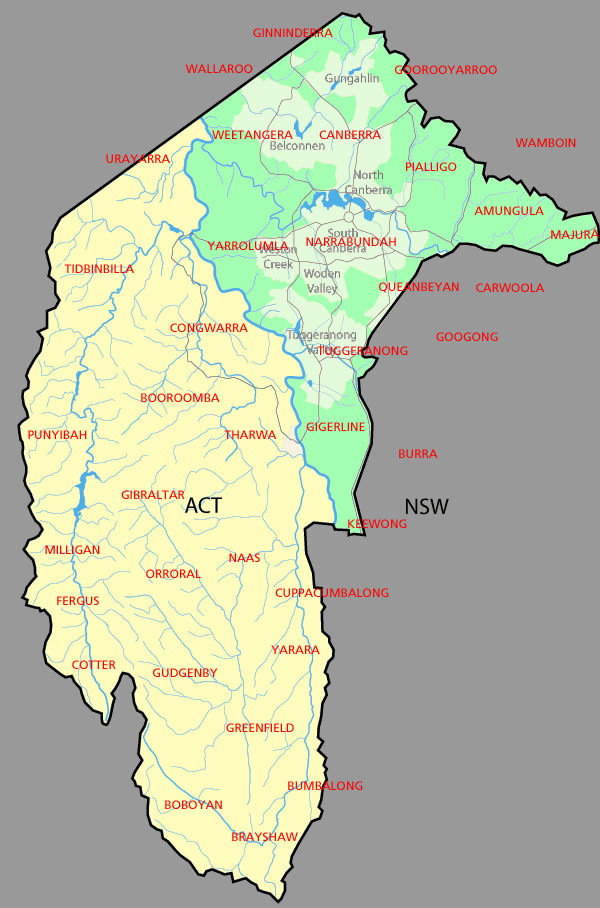
Map showing parishes (labelled in red) in the ACT area. Murray County shown in green, Cowley County in yellow.

In 1909, New South Wales transferred the land for the creation of the Federal Capital Territory to federal control through two pieces of legislation, the Seat of Government Acceptance Act 1909 and the Seat of Government Surrender Act 1909. The Act transferred Crown land in the counties of Murray and Cowley to the Commonwealth, which amounted to an area about 2,330 km^{2} (900 sq mi) and eight parcels of land near Jervis Bay. All private land in the surrendered area had to be bought by the Commonwealth. The Seat of Government Acceptance Act also gave the Commonwealth rights to use and control the waters of the Queanbeyan and Molonglo Rivers.

In 1910, the Seat of Government (Administration) Act 1910 created the legal framework for the Territory. The act specified that laws in the Territory could be made by the Commonwealth and that Ordinances could be made by the Governor-General, and placed the ACT under the jurisdiction of the New South Wales Supreme Court. When the Act came into force on 1 January 1911, control of the Territory was officially assumed by the Commonwealth. This Act remained the constitutional basis for law-making in the ACT until the granting of self-government in 1989.

The Minister for Home Affairs, King O'Malley, who was responsible for the legislation creating the ACT, also introduced a bill in 1910 making the ACT an alcohol-free area; this bill was passed by the Federal parliament and the law was not repealed until 1928. Until that time local residents travelled to Queanbeyan, just across the New South Wales border, to drink on Saturday. In 1938 the Territory was formally renamed the Australian Capital Territory.

The Jervis Bay Territory Acceptance Act 1915 and the New South Wales Seat of Government Surrender Act 1915 created a Territory of Jervis Bay, which was administered as part of the Federal Capital Territory and with all laws of the Territory applicable.

=== Resumption and disenfranchisement ===
Prior to the final decision on the location of the new capital territory, the local landowners and residents of Queanbeyan looked favourably on the possibility of having the territory located nearby. Such a result, it was hoped, would bring improvements to local infrastructure, increase the demand for local goods and services, and raise land values. It was assumed that the existing freehold arrangements would remain, and that those whose land was not required for the city itself would be in a position to capitalise on the new circumstances.

Such was not the case. Legislation restricted land holdings in the new territory to leasehold, rather than freehold. This was intended to avoid land speculation and give the national government, as the lessor, greater control over development. Landowners were concerned that the legislation had a number of shortcomings: land valuations were fixed to the date when the Act passed (8 October 1908), there was no compensation for improvements made to the land, and owners were not given first right of refusal when their old land was offered for lease.

Along with the loss of their land, local residents discovered that they had been disenfranchised. Now a part of the ACT, they had lost their vote in the New South Wales government, and their numbers were too small to warrant a seat in the new federal parliament. As a result, they had no representation in parliament through which to argue against the provisions of the legislation.

In response the residents formed the Vigilance Association with the intent of protecting their interests during the establishment of the new capital territory. Legal challenges to the resumption of the land were unsuccessful, but the Vigilance Association did win some concessions: the government agreed to pay for the improvements to the land, and did so at the value when the land was acquired; and the landowners gained the right of first refusal on their old properties when they were put up for lease. As of 2010 all residential land in the ACT is held on a 99-year crown lease.

== 20th-century development of Canberra ==
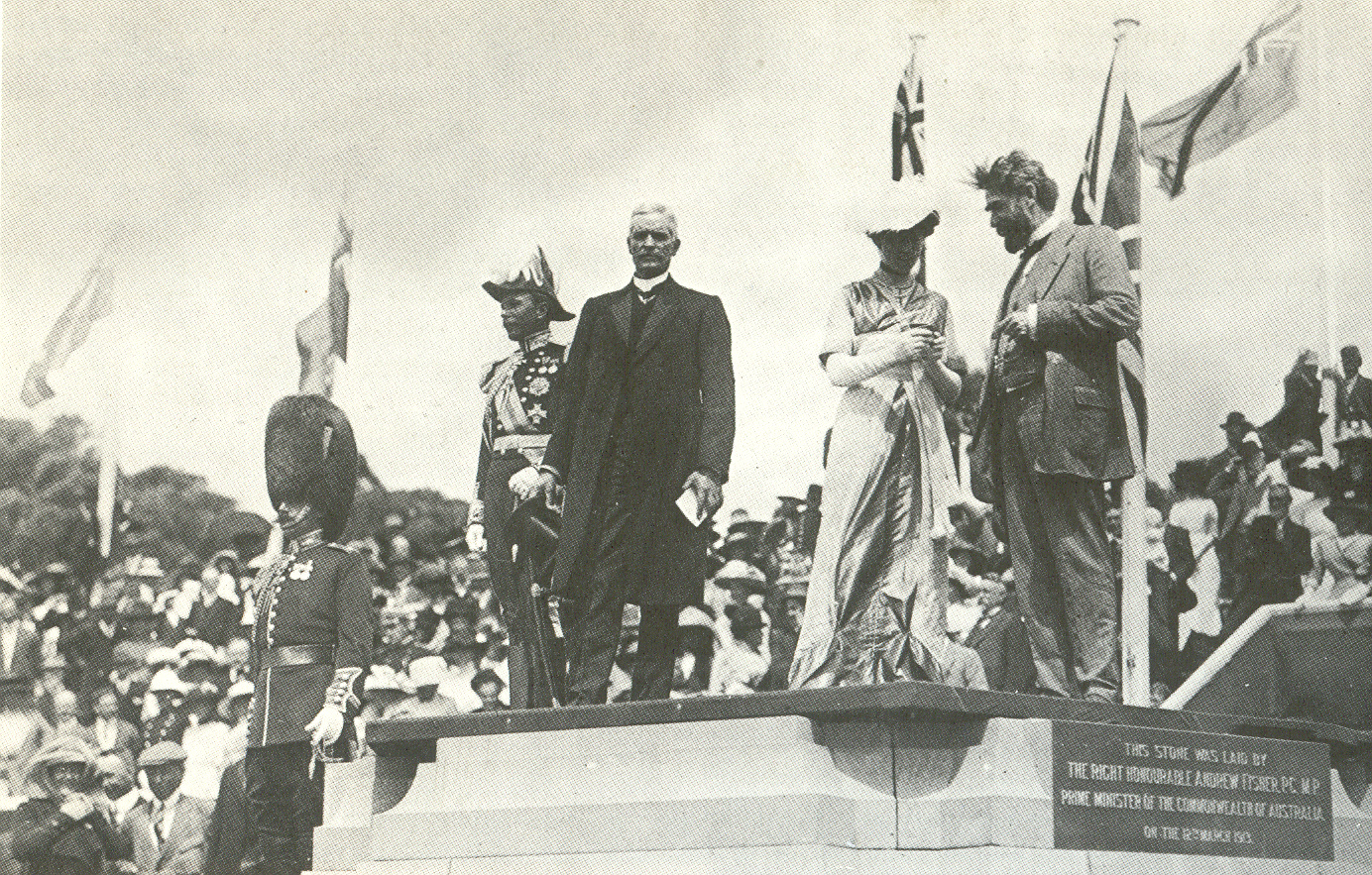
The ceremony for the naming of Canberra, 12 March 1913. Prime Minister Andrew Fisher is standing, centre, in dark suit. To his right is the Governor-General, Lord Denman, and to his left, Lady Denman.

One of the first federal facilities established in the Territory was the Royal Military College, established on the Campbells' property Duntroon, which opened in 1911. Prior to this, Australia's military lacked formally trained officers, who were needed due to changes to the Australian military model that had emerged after Federation.

In the same year, an international competition to design the future capital was held, which was won by the Chicago architect Walter Burley Griffin in 1912. Griffin's proposal, rendered by his architect wife Marion Mahony Griffin, had an abundance of geometric patterns, incorporated concentric hexagonal and octagonal streets emanating from several centres. It had as its centrepiece an elaborate lake composed of smaller bodies of water, with extensive natural vegetation around it. Griffin's proposal was "the grandest scheme submitted, yet it had an appealing simplicity and clarity". The lakes and geometry were deliberately designed so that their orientation was related to various natural topographical landmarks. It was further intended that buildings of national significance and natural landmarks would align with these geometric axes. Later, Scrivener, as part of a government committee, was responsible for modifying Griffin's winning design. He recommended a less elaborate and geometric shape, which Griffin opposed, saying that geometry was "one of the raison d'etre of the ornamental waters", but he was overruled. The new design was widely criticised as being ugly.

The official naming of Canberra occurred on 12 March 1913, and construction began immediately. After official indecision over the plan, revisions and their implementation, Griffin was invited to Canberra to discuss the matter. He arrived in August 1913 and was appointed Federal Capital Director of Design and Construction for three years. Bureaucratic wrangling delayed Griffin's work; a Royal Commission in 1916 ruled his authority for executing the plan had been usurped by certain officials. Griffin had a strained working relationship with the Australian authorities, and a lack of federal government funding meant that by the time he left in 1920, little significant work had been done on the city. Prime Minister Billy Hughes removed Griffin from his position. At the time of his removal, Griffin had revised his plan, overseen the earthworks of the major avenues, and established the Glenloch Cork Plantation.

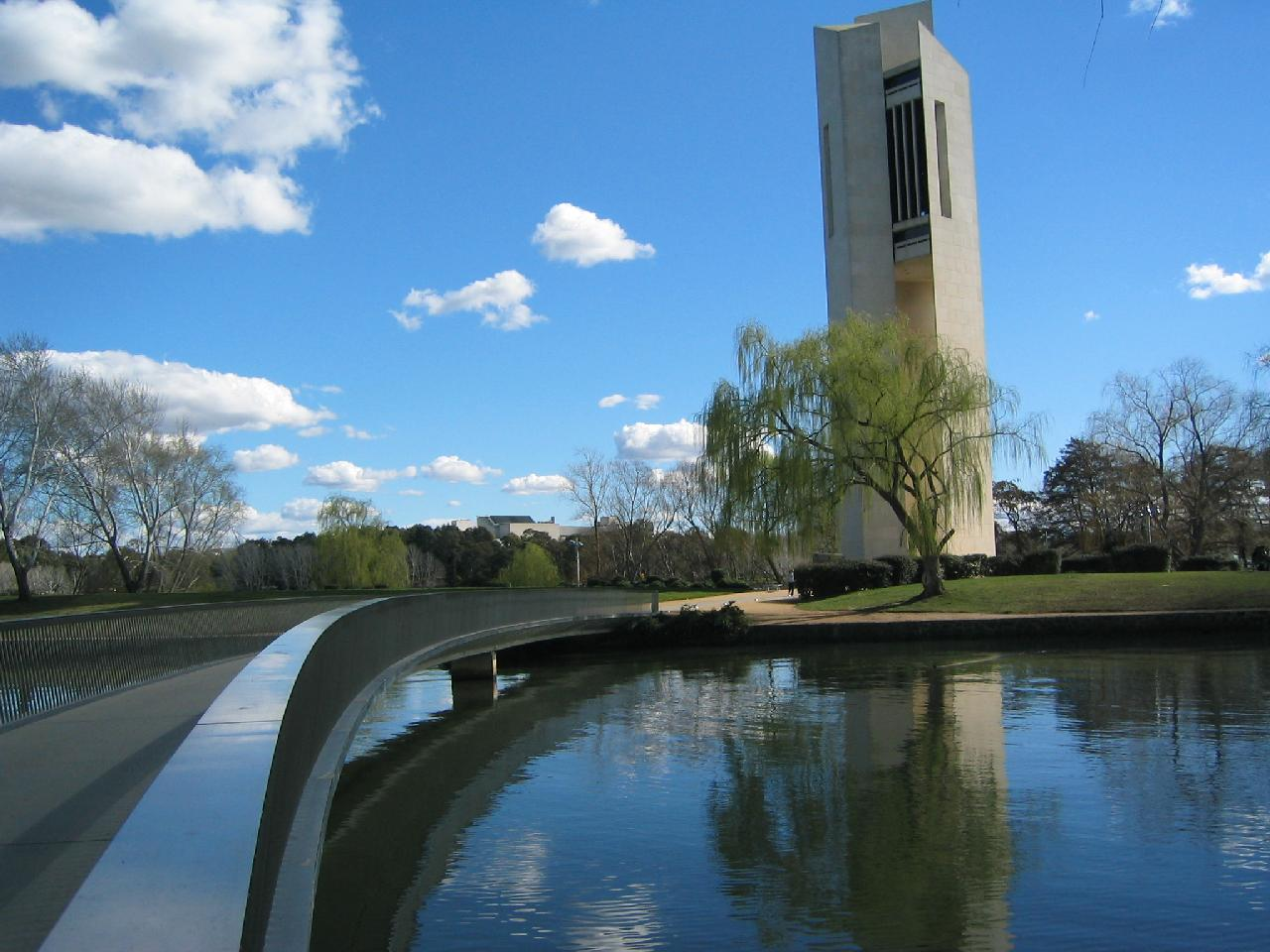
The National Carillon on Queen Elizabeth II Island in Lake Burley Griffin, Canberra, celebrates the 50th anniversary of Australia's national capital

After Griffin's departure, the Federal Capital Advisory Committee was established to advise the government of the construction efforts. The Committee had limited success meeting its goals; however, the chairman, John Sulman, was instrumental in applying the ideas of the garden city movement to Griffin's plan. The Committee was replaced in 1925 by the Federal Capital Commission. The role of the FCC was to prepare Canberra for the transfer of the Commonwealth Parliament and the public service from Melbourne to Canberra. The Federal Government officially relocated to the ACT from Melbourne on the formal opening of the Provisional Parliament House on 9 May 1927. Among the new Parliament's first acts was the repeal of the prohibition laws. At first the public service remained based in Melbourne, the various departments' headquarters only gradually moving to Canberra over the space of several years. From 1938 to 1957 the National Capital Planning and Development Committee (NCPDC) continued to plan the further expansion of Canberra; however, the NCPDC did not have executive power, and decisions were made on the development of Canberra without the Committee's consultation. A few major buildings were constructed during this period of NCPDC responsibility, such as the Australian War Memorial, which opened in 1941. With the onset of the Great Depression, followed by World War II, development of the new capital was slow, and in the decade after the end of the war, Canberra was criticised for resembling a village, and its disorganised collection of buildings was deemed ugly. Canberra was often derisively described as "several suburbs in search of a city". The Prime Minister, Robert Menzies, regarded the state of the national capital as an embarrassment. Over time his attitude changed from one of contempt to that of championing its development. He fired two ministers charged with the development of the city, feeling that their performance lacked intensity. Menzies ruled for over a decade and in that time the development of the capital sped up rapidly.

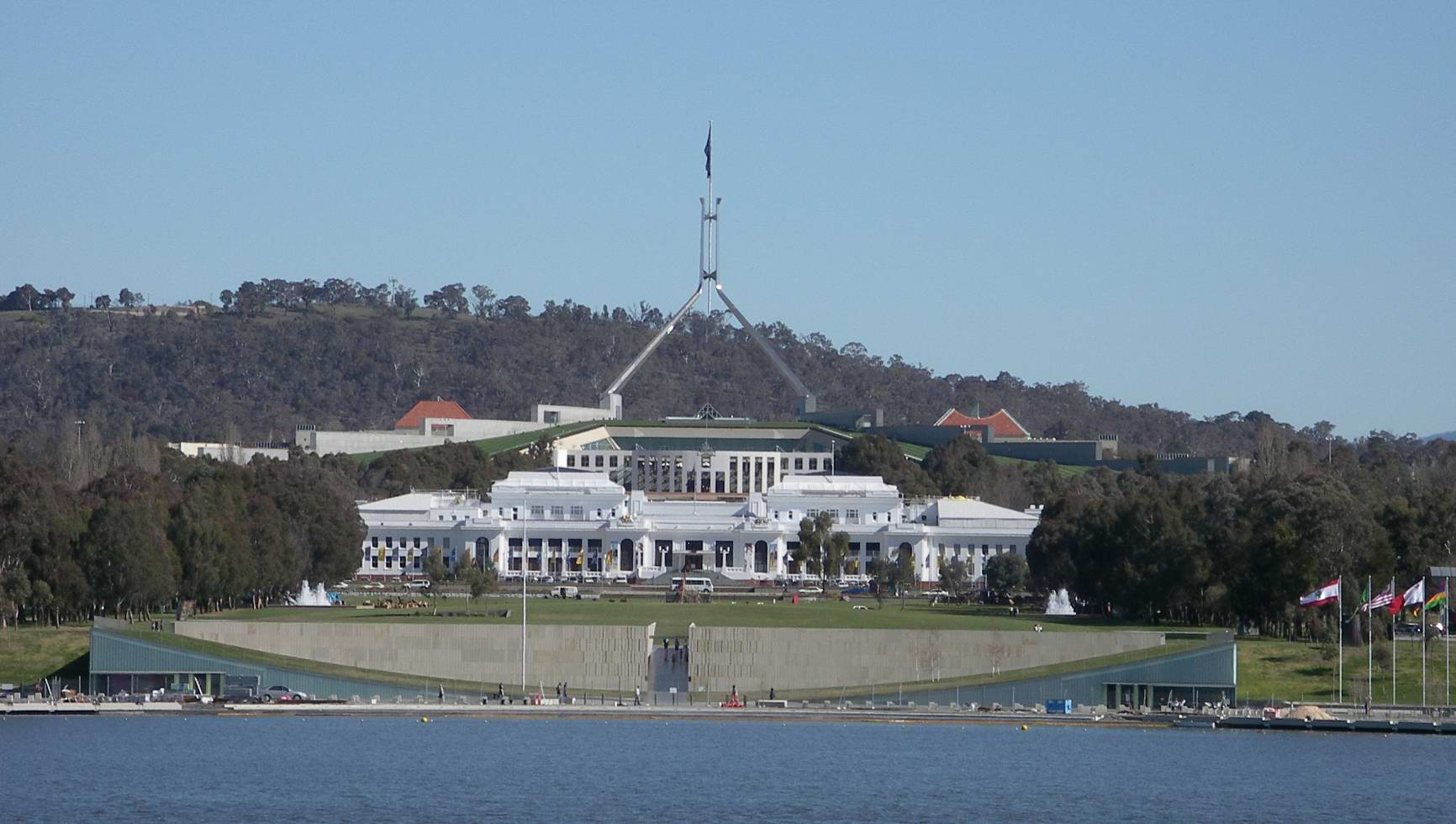
Three of Canberra's best-known landmarks, Lake Burley Griffin (foreground), Old Parliament House (front), and New Parliament House (rear)

After World War II there was a shortage of housing and office space in Canberra, so a Senate Select Committee hearing was held in 1954 to address its development requirements. This Committee recommended the creation of a single planning body with executive power. Consequently, the NCPDC was replaced by the National Capital Development Commission (NCDC) in 1957. The NCDC ended four decades of disputes over the shape and design of Lake Burley Griffin, and construction was completed in 1964 after four years of work. The completion of the centrepiece of Griffin's design finally laid the platform for the development of Griffin's Parliamentary Triangle. In the four decades since the initial construction of the lake, various buildings of national importance were constructed on the lakefront. According to the policy plan of the government, "The lake is not only one of the centrepieces of Canberra's plan in its own right, but forms the immediate foreground of the National Parliamentary Area." The newly built Australian National University, on the northern shores of the lake was expanded, and sculptures and monuments were built.

The completion of the central basin placed a waterway between Parliament House and the War Memorial and a landscaped boulevard was built along the land axis. A new National Library was constructed within the Parliamentary Triangle, followed by the High Court of Australia, the National Gallery and finally a new Parliament House in 1988. In 2001, the National Museum was built on the former lakeside site of the Royal Canberra Hospital.

On average, the population of Canberra increased by more than 50% every five years between 1955 and 1975 as the development of the capital became more concerted. To accommodate the influx of residents, the NCDC oversaw the release of new residential land though the creation of new town centres: Woden opened in 1964, followed by Belconnen in 1966, Weston Creek in 1969 and Tuggeranong in 1973. The NCDC was disbanded in 1988, its planning authority transferred to the newly created ACT government and the new National Capital Authority, which was established to oversee Commonwealth interests in development of the national capital. Canberra has continued to grow with the further release of residential land in Gungahlin in the 1990s.

== 20th-century development outside of Canberra ==
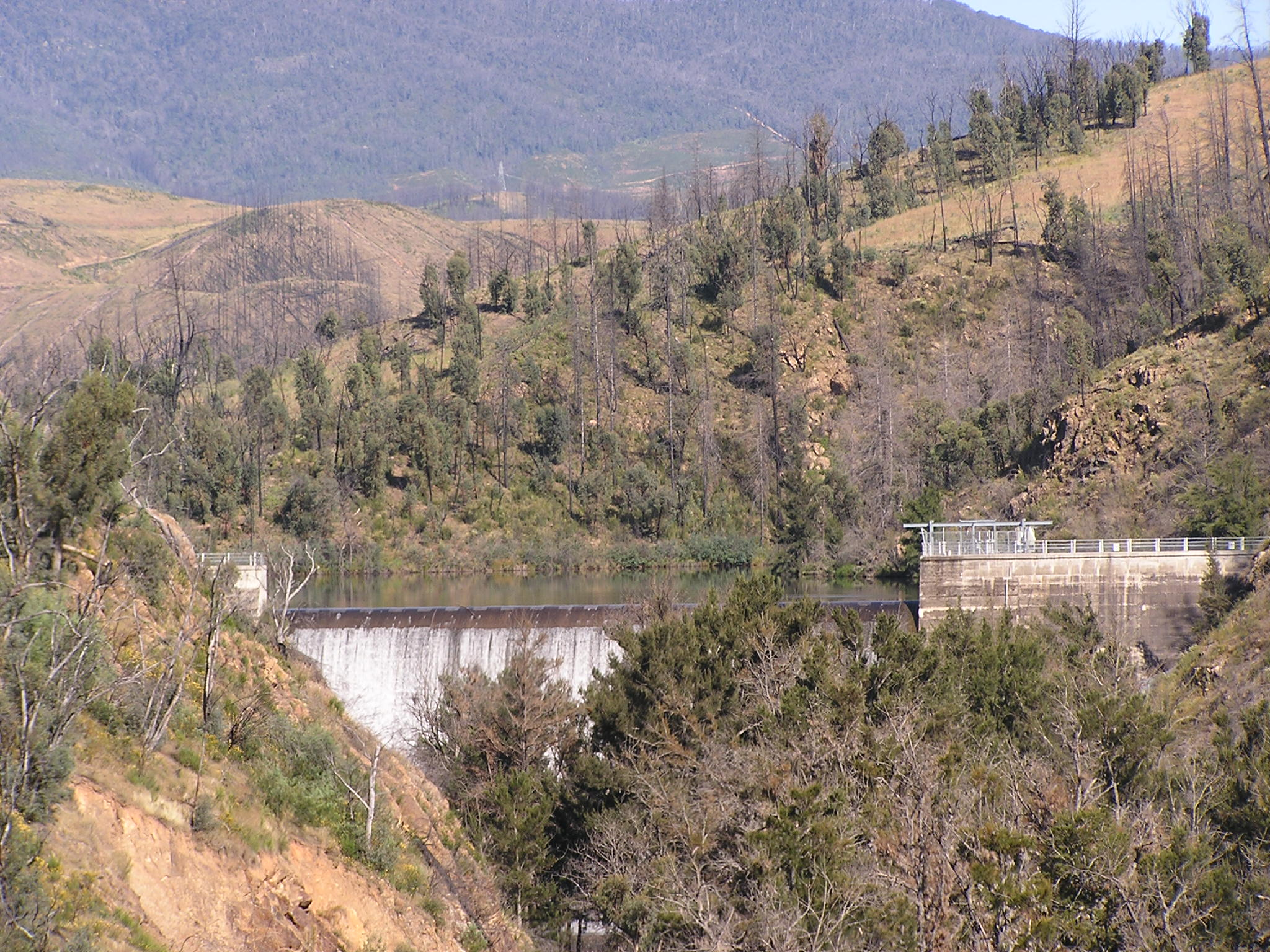
The Cotter Dam in December 2005. Surrounding country still showing the effects of the 2003 bushfires

A significant priority for the establishment of Canberra was the construction of water storage facilities. Cotter Dam was the first dam built on the Cotter River; construction on this 18.5 m (60.7 ft) concrete gravity dam started in 1912 and finished in 1915. Its height was raised to 31 m (101.7 ft) in 1951. Chlorination of Canberra's water began at Cotter Dam in 1955; operations were moved to the Mount Stromlo Water Treatment Plant in June 1967.

Two additional dams were built on the Cotter: the Bendora Dam, a double-curvature, concrete-arch structure, was completed in 1961; and the Corin Dam, an earth and rock-fill embankment dam, was built in 1968. In 1979 Googong Dam was built on the Queanbeyan River in New South Wales.

Transport into and out of the ACT was an early development priority. In 1931 the Federal Highway linking the ACT to Goulburn was completed, and in 1936 an airfield was constructed at Duntroon. On 13 August 1940 Australia's chief military officer and three senior ministers in the Menzies Government, James Fairbairn, Geoffrey Street and Henry Somer Gullett, were killed when their plane crashed on the southern approach to Canberra.

A 6.5 km (4.0 mi) branch from the Bombala railway line was built from Queanbeyan to Canberra in 1914 and extended to Civic in June 1921, but the bridge over the Molonglo River was washed away in 1922 and never rebuilt. Plans to build a railway to Yass were abandoned. A 1067 mm gauge construction railway was built in 1923 between the Yarralumla brickworks and the provisional Parliament House. It was later extended to Civic, but the whole line was closed in May 1927. A railway connecting Canberra to Jervis Bay was planned, but never constructed. Several facilities were built in Jervis Bay including the Royal Australian Naval College (HMAS Creswell) erected in 1913, the Jervis Bay Air Base Range, and a Botanic Gardens.

The native forest of the ACT was composed almost wholly of eucalypt species and provided a resource for fuel and domestic purposes, especially during the economic boom following World War II. By the early 1960s, logging had depleted the eucalypt, and concern about water quality in the Cotter River catchment led to the forests being closed. Interest in forestry had begun in 1915, when T. C. G. Weston had commenced trials of a number of species including Pinus radiata on the slopes of Mount Stromlo. Plantation forestry began in earnest in 1926 with 2 km^{2} (0.8 sq mi) planted annually around Uriarra and Pierces Creek.

By 1938 the area planted yearly was 4 km^{2} (1.5 sq mi), with the favourable benefit of reducing erosion in the Cotter catchment. In 1967 the Australian Government approved a plan for a total 160 km^{2} (61.8 sq mi) of plantation in the ACT, which was achieved in 1970. The ease of access to the plantations has made them popular recreation areas for Canberrans. Throughout the 20th century, significant areas of plantation forest were periodically lost to bushfires, with major fires occurring in 1939, 1952, 1979, 1983, 2001 and 2003.

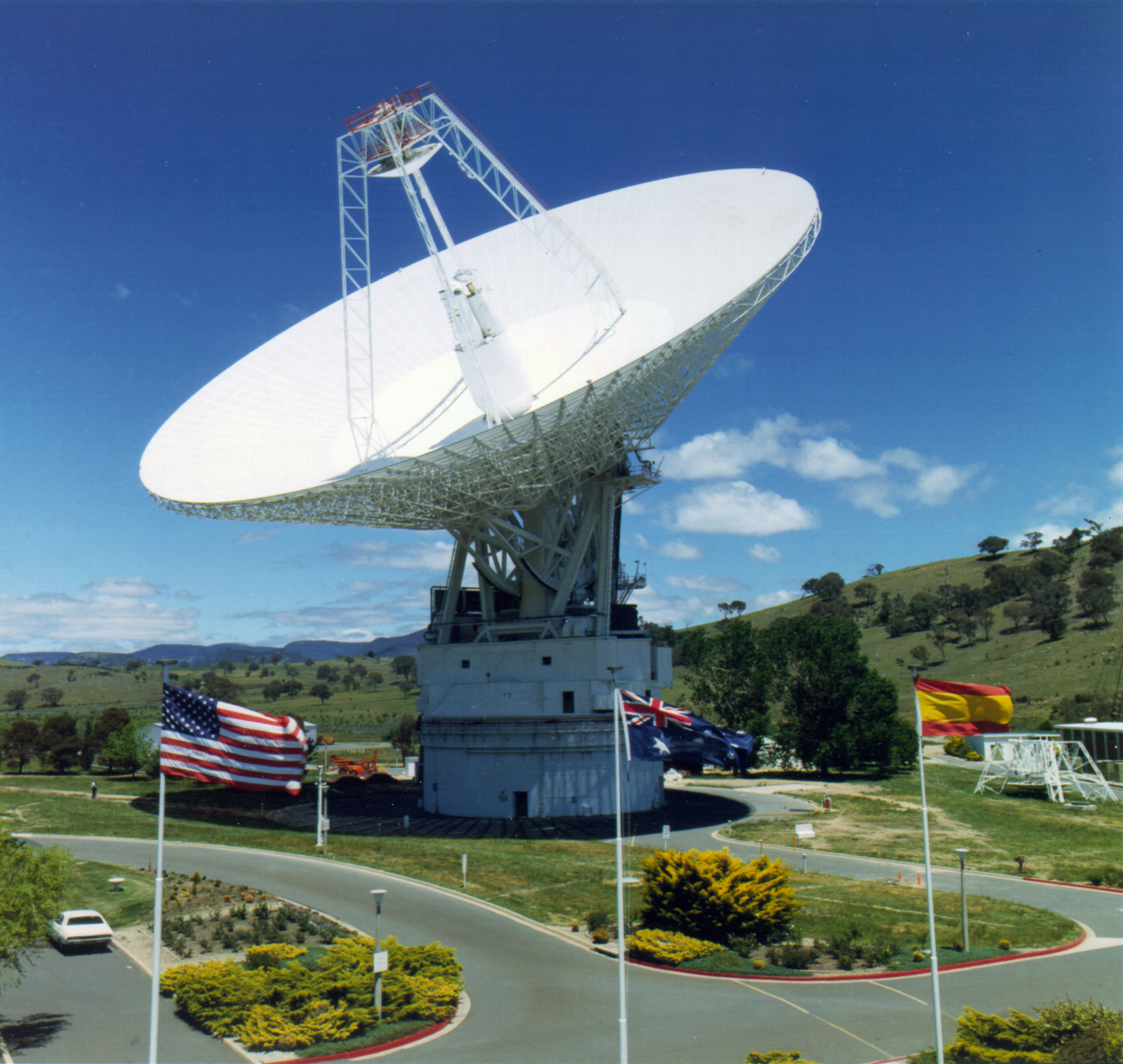
The Tidbinbilla tracking station opened in 1965

In 1936 about 8.1 km^{2} (3.1 sq mi) of forest was set aside to create the Tidbinbilla Nature Reserve, and in 1939 a koala enclose was built by the Institute of Anatomy. The government acquired land to establish a national park and fauna reserve in 1962, expanding it to 36.3 km^{2} (14.0 sq mi) and later, to its current size of 54.5 km^{2} (21.0 sq mi). In 1969 the first wildlife displays were created, and the park was officially gazetted in 1971. In 1984 the Namadgi National Park was declared. It is 1,061 km^{2} (409.7 sq mi) and takes up approximately 46% of the ACT's land.

In 1911, Mount Stromlo was assessed as a possible site for a Commonwealth Solar Observatory, and it became the location of the facility in 1924. It was operated as a Commonwealth government facility until 1957, when it was transferred to the Australian National University (ANU). From 1944 to 1968 it was also the site of the national time-keeping service. By the early 1980s, Mount Stromlo, together with the ANU's Siding Spring observatory, was producing Australia's greatest astronomical research output.

The Australian Government signed an agreement with the United States in 1960 for the establishment of satellite-tracking stations in the ACT. As a result of the agreement, three tracking stations were built in the ACT by NASA. The Canberra Deep Space Communication Complex was officially opened on 19 March 1965 by Prime Minister Menzies, and is the only station still in operation in the ACT, communicating with interplanetary spacecraft.

The Orroral Valley Tracking Station, which was for orbiting satellite support, opened in May 1965 in what is now part of Namadgi National Park, was closed down in 1985. Honeysuckle Creek Tracking Station, completed in December 1966, was a communications relay station for Project Apollo, Skylab and interplanetary spacecraft from 1967 until 1981, when its 26 m (85.3 ft) antenna was moved to the Canberra Deep Space Communication Complex. It was closed in July 2009 and is now being dismantled.

== Government and the ACT ==
The Australian Capital Territory Police was created in 1927, the same year the federal government moved to the ACT, with eleven officers. The size of the force grew over subsequent decades with the development of Canberra, and oversaw law and order in the territory until 1979. In that year, the ACT Police merged with the Commonwealth Police and the Federal Narcotics Bureau to form the Australian Federal Police (AFP), which then took responsibility for law and order in Canberra. Since self-government was granted in 1988, the AFP has performed this under contract to the ACT government.

The ACT was given its first federal representation in 1949, when it gained a seat in the House of Representatives, the Division of Australian Capital Territory, under the 1948 Representation Act which increased the size of the House of Representatives. The ACT member could only vote on matters directly affecting the Territory. In 1974, the ACT and the Northern Territory were each allocated two Senate seats. In 1974, the House of Representatives seat was divided into two, the Division of Canberra and Division of Fraser. A third, the Division of Namadgi, was created in 1996, but was abolished in 1998 after an updated assessment of changes to the regional demographic distribution. Both House of Representatives seats have mostly been held by the Australian Labor Party (ALP), while the ALP and the Liberal Party of Australia each held one Senate seat until 2022.

In 1930, the ACT Advisory Council was established to advise the Minister for Territories on the community's concerns and from 1934 the territory had its own Supreme Court. In 1974 the Council became a fully elected Legislative Assembly, advising the Minister of the Capital Territory, and in 1979 this was renamed the House of Assembly.

=== Movements towards self-governance ===
Although there was a push by residents of the ACT for a greater say in the management of the territory, this did not necessarily equate to a desire for self-governance. John Overall, who served as the head of the NCDC from 1957 to 1972, summarised the distinction in "Canberra: Yesterday, Today and Tomorrow":

Canberra residents may have been demanding a greater say in their destiny, but they rejected attempts by the Federal Government to have them take control of their own affairs through self-government. They appeared reluctant to accept the responsibility of governing themselves, or perhaps, the increased costs which they feared would inevitably follow the handover of power from the Federal Government to a local body. ... [M]ost realised that the end of direct control by the Federal Government would inevitably lead to higher taxes or a cut in services, as indeed was the case when self-government finally occurred in the late 1980s.

Nevertheless, there were many residents in Canberra who wanted self-government, and there were a number of forces pushing the territory in that direction. In 1973 the Minister for the Capital Territory, Gordon Bryant, announced that the ACT would have self-government within 12 months.

The formation of the Legislative Assembly in 1974 was intended as the significant step towards self-government, but the Whitlam government, under whose auspices the Assembly was formed, tended to "override or ignore its wishes." Similarly, the subsequent 1975 Fraser government seemed uninterested in the Assembly. However, in February 1976, Tony Staley accepted the post of Minister for the Capital Territory. Staley had been a supporter of self-government for the ACT, and he proposed a model whereby Canberrans would rapidly gain control of much of the territory's administration. The model found opposition, though, in part because it failed to adequately address the funding arrangements.

Although Staley's plan did not eventuate, the next person to run the Ministry, Robert Ellicott, chose to hold a referendum on the issue. The referendum on 27 November 1978 provided the residents of the territory with three options:

- That self-government be granted to the Territory by delegating functions to a locally elected legislative body.
- That a locally elected legislative body be established in the Territory with local government-type legislative and executive functions.
- That the present arrangements for governing the Territory should continue for the time being.

A clear majority voted for continuing with the status quo – 63.75%, as opposed to 5.72% in favour of the local government model and 30.54% supporting the "state style" self-government approach.

Overall identified a number of reasons why residents opposed self-government. Along with the previously mentioned fear of increases in taxation or decreases in services, he argued that those living in the ACT would have felt that they already had a voice in the governance of the territory, through federal electoral representation. Canberra also had a high proportion of public servants who felt that they were already a part of the government, and knew how to work with the system.

In spite of the result, the referendum failed to end the debate. There were a number of pressures that continued to push the ACT towards self-government, including:

- National consistency of governance. In 1978 the Northern Territory achieved self-government. The ACT was the only other mainland territory, with a population greater than that of the Northern Territory that was growing faster, so it was suggested that if self-government was appropriate for the Northern Territory, then it must also be appropriate for the ACT.
- The re-enfranchisement of the community. Two inquiries had recommended that the ACT needed to provide the community with "the same sort of representative institutions that have been established in other parts of Australia".
- Financial pressures. The ACT had enjoyed high quality services through Federal Government funding, to the extent that the Federal Grants Commission report that Australia was subsidising the residents "to the tune of over $200 for every man, woman and child in the Territory." Self-government would allow the ACT to be placed on the same financial footing as that of the other states and the Northern Territory. This was identified by Bill Harris, the head of the ACT Administration just prior to self-government, as the "fundamental reason" for the eventual realisation of self-government in the Territory.

In 1988, the new minister for the ACT, Gary Punch, received a report recommending the abolition of the NCDC and the formation of a locally elected government. Punch recommended that the Hawke government accept the report's recommendations, and subsequently Clyde Holding introduced legislation to grant self-government to the Territory in October 1988.

=== Self-government ===
The enactment on 6 December 1988 of the Australian Capital Territory (Self-Government) Act 1988 established the framework for ACT self-government. The first election for the 17-member Australian Capital Territory Legislative Assembly was held on 4 March 1989. The provisions of the Act establishing the ACT as a self-governing territory within the Commonwealth of Australia commenced operation on 11 May 1989, coinciding with the first sitting of the Legislative Assembly at 1 Constitution Avenue, Civic. The Australian Labor Party formed the ACT's first government, led by Chief Minister Rosemary Follett, who made history as Australia's first female head of government. Although since the commencement of self-government, ACT law has continued to apply in general to the Jervis Bay Territory under section 4A of the Jervis Bay Territory Acceptance Act 1915, the ACT as defined under the Self-Government Act 1988 does not include Jervis Bay, which continues to be administered by the Commonwealth. Since 1992, members of the Assembly have been elected by the Hare-Clark proportional representation system from three multi-member electorates, which replaced the modified D'Hondt method used in the inaugural election, in which the 17 representatives were elected from a territory-wide electorate.

Whereas the ACT's federal electorates have been mainly held by Labor, the Liberal Party has been able to gain some footing in the ACT Assembly, and were in government for just over eight years of the Assembly's 21-year history. Most of this was during a period of six and a half years from 1995 to 2001, which ended when Labor gained a 14.1% swing at the polls. In contrast to the state elections, Labor has polled at least seven percentage points more than the Liberals at every federal election since 1990, and their average lead since then has been 15 percentage points.

The initial years of self-government were difficult and unstable. A majority of ACT residents had opposed self-government and had it imposed upon them by the federal parliament, and at the first election, 4 of the 17 seats were won by anti-self-government single-issue parties due to a protest vote by disgruntled territorians, and a total of 8 were won by minor parties and independents. Follett and Labor won only four seats and had to form a minority government, as seven groups were represented in total. Some of the anti-self-government representatives sought to disrupt the territory's legislature from the inside, and a no-confidence motion toppled Labor after only seven months. Trevor Kaine and the Liberals ruled for 18 months before being deposed, and Follett's Labor returned, the third government in 25 months. In 1992, Labor won eight seats, and the minor parties and independents won only three. Stability increased, and in 1995, Kate Carnell became the first elected Liberal chief minister. In 1998 Carnell became the first chief minister to be re-elected. She was regarded as a proactive leader but resigned in 2000 after two independents who had supported her minority government withdrew their support. At the time, she had been embroiled in controversy over the funding of the Canberra Stadium and an accidental fatality caused by the Royal Canberra Hospital implosion. Labor have won the six elections since 2001, and in 2004 formed the first majority government in the territory, but after the 2008 election were forced into minority government with the Greens, followed by a coalition government with the Greens after the 2012 election. The 2024 election returned Labor to sole minority government, with a confidence and supply agreement reached between the two parties.

In 2006, the majority Labor government made sweeping changes to the education system, shutting down 23 schools across the territory. These were made in the face of sustained public opposition, and since then, there have been campaigns from opposition parties and the community to re-open some of them. This included the 2008 election, where it was a major topic.

Since the 1993 creation of the National Native Title Tribunal, there have been four separate claims to Native Title lodged over alienated lands in the ACT by representatives of the Ngunnawal communities, in 1996, 1997, 1998 and 2002. The first two of these were discontinued after reaching a Federal Court hearing, and the third was rejected as not meeting applicable provisions. The fourth claim was dismissed.

In 2001, the ACT government entered into a cooperative agreement with the Aboriginal community over the management of Namadgi National Park. The deal no longer exists.

In the 1990s, a number of activities which are or were illegal in other Australian states were legalised in the ACT. These include the sale of X-rated pornographic materials (1989) and prostitution in brothels (1992), although brothels are only permitted to operate in the suburbs of Hume, Mitchell and Fyshwick. The personal use of cannabis was decriminalised in 1992 and abortion was decriminalised in 2002. In 2006, the ACT Government attempted to introduce a law recognising civil unions, but it was overturned by the federal government.

== 21st century ==
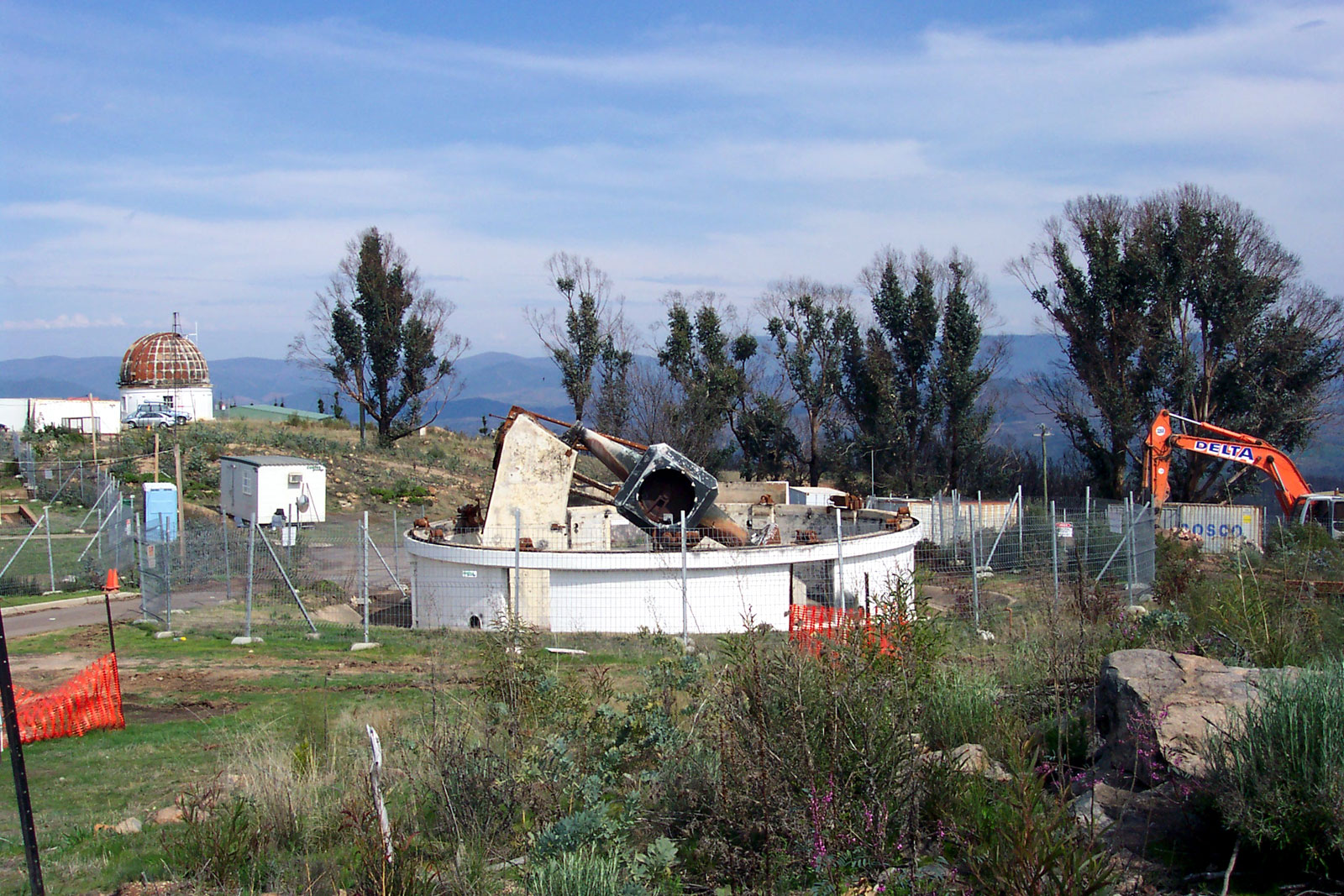
Remains of a telescope dome at Mount Stromlo Observatory after the 2003 Canberra bushfires

The first years of the 21st century saw a period of extended drought in the ACT region, accompanied by several bushfires that caused widespread devastation. Over the 2001 Christmas period, five separate bushfires burnt over 16 km^{2} (6.2 sq mi) of forest in the ACT, including millions of dollars' worth of plantation pine forest.

The ACT Labor Party has been in power since 2001 as of 2025.

The drought conditions continued during the following years, and in 2003 the ACT burned again. The 2003 bushfires damaged around 70% of the ACT's area, including 99% of the Tidbinbilla Nature Reserve and significant areas of government-owned pine plantation. Four people were killed and 67 rural houses were destroyed, including 16 houses at Uriarra and 12 at Pierces Creek; 414 houses in the outer suburbs of Canberra were razed.

More than 200 other houses were damaged, and numerous buildings of historical significance were lost, including the Mount Franklin Chalet, which was built in 1937–38 for the Canberra Alpine Club and was the first club-built ski lodge in mainland Australia, and many others in the Namadgi National Park. Nil Desperandum and Rock Valley Homestead, the two historic houses at Tidbinbilla, were destroyed. Most buildings of the Mount Stromlo Observatory, operated by the Australian National University, were destroyed, including the observatory's Oddie telescope and its dome, which had been built in 1911 and was the first federal building in the ACT.

On 7 December 2013, the ACT same-sex marriage act came into effect, making the ACT the first legislature in Australia to allow same-sex marriages. On 12 December 2013, the High Court of Australia unanimously held this law to be invalid for inconsistency with the federal Marriage Act 1961. However, all parties to the case had agreed and the Court accepted that the federal parliament's power to make laws with respect to "marriage", Constitution s 51(21), extends to same-sex marriage. There can now be uniform federal law for marriages of any kind.
