= Mahkoolma =

Coordinates: 34°56′6″S 148°39′22″E

Mahkoolma was the name given to one of the sites proposed for Australia's national capital city, prior to selection of Canberra. The name Mahkoolma is not used today, and the once proposed city site now lies across the boundary of the modern-day localities of Bookham and Burrinjuck, New South Wales.

== Political context ==
In 1904, the Commonwealth Parliament had passed the Seat of Government Act 1904, which legislated that the new national capital of Australia would be at a location within 17 miles of Dalgety, New South Wales. The Government of New South Wales, led by Premier Joseph Carruthers, was strongly opposed to that choice. Their refusal to accept Dalgety, among other opposition to the site, prevented progress. New South Wales had an effective veto over the capital site, because it would need to pass legislation to cede part of its territory, as a new capital territory.

Mahkoolma was a site promoted by New South Wales, as one of a number of alternatives to Dalgety—17 in all—which New South Wales considered superior to Dalgety and located in their preferred area, around Yass and Queanbeyan. Briefly, for a time during 1906, Mahkoolma was their favoured option. It also seems that around this time, despite their differences in political ideology, Chris Watson, the Federal Labor leader and a former Prime Minister of Australia, and Premier Curruthers were cooperating, both aiming to overturn the selection of Dalgety.

The main advocate for Mahkoolma was the then Government Architect of New South Wales, Walter Liberty Vernon (1846–1914). He managed to persuade others, including Premier Curruthers, to support it. However, support for the site was not universal, even in New South Wales. The Chief Surveyor, Arthur (A. L.) Lloyd, one of the few who knew Canberra well, favoured that site. Vernon had a pamphlet made, which included hand-painted illustrations by Charles Coulter, to promote Mahkoolma's candidacy.

== The site ==
One of the advantages of Makoolma's site was its proximity to the lake formed by Burrinjuck Dam, construction of which was about to commence. This dam now impounds the waters of the Murrumbidgee, Yass, and Goodradigabee Rivers. The dam also impounds the water of the smaller watercourse, Carrolls Creek, that ran through the proposed site of the capital city. The name Mahkoolma is from either, or both of, 'Mahkoolma Creek'—an old alternative name for Carrolls Creek—or a derelict property in the area called 'Mahkoolma' or 'Marcoolma'. That property had first been taken up by Edward Carroll, and another old name for the area was Carroll's Flats.

The location of the proposed city site was on high land above the right bank of Murrumbidgee River, about sixteen miles (26 km) from the railway line at Bowning and nine miles (14 km) from the main road at Bookham. The site of Mahkoolma was to be between 1,900 and 2,000 feet (580 and 610 m) above sea level—placing it well above the original Murrumbidgee valley floor and the impounded water of the new dam—in the upper reaches of Carrolls Creek. Its southernmost extent would reach the north end of the gorge through which the lower part of Carrolls Creek flowed into the Murrumbidgee. Its western extent included adjacent land in the catchment of Talmo Creek, an upper part of the Jugiong Creek catchment. There still is today a property toward the north of the area, called 'Macoolama'. The federal territory, the hinterland of the proposed city, was to be the area between the Murrumbidgee and the Great South Road (modern-day Hume Highway). In contrast to Dalgety, Mahkoolma was relatively close to Sydney—but beyond 100 miles from it, as stipulated in section 125 of the Australian constitution—and it lay relatively close to the existing railway line connecting Sydney and Melbourne.

The dam was intended to control water flows for irrigation purposes, and the lake's water level would of necessity fluctuate greatly, and would even nearly empty in times of prolonged drought. Vernon anticipated that a modification of the dam would be needed to allow it to provide a picturesque ornamental lake for the proposed capital city, but without elaborating on how that would be possible. It was not the only problem with the site. In an otherwise highly favourable report, published in May 1906, Vernon conceded that, "the site offers no opportunity for the visionary to design a theoretical city, either on the "Cobweb” or "Chess Board" plan, but, like all European Capitals and Cities, that rightly lay claim to beauty of situation and appropriateness of combination of city and surroundings, this one provides a similar opportunity to be followed—for, while level and gently rising sites for the Governmental, Commercial. and Industrial requirements are available at Mahkoolma, the residential suburbs must find a home on the wooded foothills and valleys encircling the main site in all directions.

Vernon stated in the same report that, "Another site at Canberra ... on the higher reaches of the Murrumbidgee, possesses many qualifications, but in my opinion, these are inferior to those of the Mahkoolma Site, and it is here mentioned only as a remote alternative."

== Inspection tour ==
A visit by federal parliamentarians, to inspect the Mahkoolma site on 11 August 1906, was a disastrous failure. Poor impressions of the site itself were probably magnified by the effects of the arduous journey to reach it.

The parliamentarians left Melbourne in the afternoon of 10 August 1906, by sleeper train, and arrived at Bowning in the early hours of the following morning. They then travelled in horse-drawn vehicles from Bowning, over the rough and boggy road, on a cold and windy winter day, with rain falling. The vehicles became bogged and had to be eased out of the quagmire, with some of the parliamentarians assisting in these efforts. At times, the visitors had to get out and walk, some walking for five of the sixteen miles. Chris Watson, the Labor leader and former Prime Minister, travelled in relative comfort, but only because he had borrowed a trooper's horse to ride over the rough route.

Upon arrival at the site—most around two hours behind schedule—they found that the marquee, in which their lunch was to be provided, had blown down. A few of the party carried on to the junction of the Murrumbidgee and Goodradigbee, and found fine scenery; but that was not the Mahkoolma site and would later be inundated by the dam. Chris Watson and Mr Webster climbed a hill to take in the fine views, extending toward Kiandra; but for most, it was a hurried visit, with just enough time to "look across the sloping plateau toward the enveloping range of timber-covered hills, or at the dense array of dead trees, which gave the rising ground behind them such a desolate appearance", while they ate damp sandwiches, in their wet clothes.

Most of the visitors were not impressed with Mahkoolma, and just wanted to be away from the place. One of them, a prominent member of the House of Representatives, was quoted as saying, "I consider that this visit must have been a practical joke, or else those who invited us did not know the locality." Mahkoolma had decisively missed its chance to be the site of the new capital, and only advocates of Dalgety—the rival site, strongly opposed by Curruthers and his government—such as Austin Chapman, seemed pleased with outcome of events that day.

After a day's rest at Goulburn to recover, the visitors then moved on to a hurriedly reorganised tour of Canberra and the 'Molonglo Plains'. Probably jaded and exhausted by their earlier experience, some did not immediately appreciate the future site of Canberra, on what was the first time it had been inspected by parliamentarians. It ranked somewhat higher than Mahkoolma, and at least the weather was better. However, some members were won over, and Canberra won an influential supporter that day, Chris Watson. Immediately after visiting the Canberra site, Watson wrote to Premier Curruthers, expressing his view that Canberra was "the only site that will seriously compete with Dalgety" and that Lake George was "out of the running". Perhaps to spare Curruthers embarrassment, Watson's letter made no mention of Mahkoolma. Watson went on to urge Curruthers "to arrange for as many [of the group of parliamentarians returning from a visit to Dalgety] as desire to visit Canberra, in lieu of going to Lake George." Only three took up that opportunity to see Canberra, guided by Chief Surveyor Lloyd. One of them, the influential Senator Symon, was won over and stated of Canberra, "the site seems to me an ideal one".

So it was that the disastrous visit to Mahkoolma, at least in part, helped to refocus the opposition to Dalgety into advocacy for Canberra.

== Aftermath ==
Mahkoolma, effectively, was no longer in contention, but it was not eliminated officially. However, when the parliamentarians put the capital site to a series of ballots, during October 1908, Mahkoolma was not one of the alternatives. In the ninth and last ballot, Dalgety lost to 'Yass-Canberra' by 33 votes to 39.

Curiously, even after the passing of the Seat of Government Act 1908, it seems that Charles Scrivener spent a couple of days, in January 1909, looking at the Mahkoolma site; its proximity to Yass allowed Mahkoolma to fit within a broad definition of the 'Yass-Canberra' district. He inspected the 'Yass-Canberra' sites—Mahkoolma, Yass, Gundaroo, Hall, Lake George and Canberra—but it was Canberra that he recommended and which became the capital.

== Present day ==
The area remains a quiet rural backwater. Except for a property in north of the area, called 'Macoolama', there is little to suggest it is the erstwhile proposed capital city site, Mahkoolma. The nearest settlement is Burrinjuck, on the northern lake shore, and Burrinjuck Road passes through the site that once could have become the capital.

A copy of Vernon's illustrated pamphlet, with Charles Coulter's watercolour sketches—one of the few reminders of Mahkoolma—is held by the National Library of Australia, in Canberra.

== Gallery ==
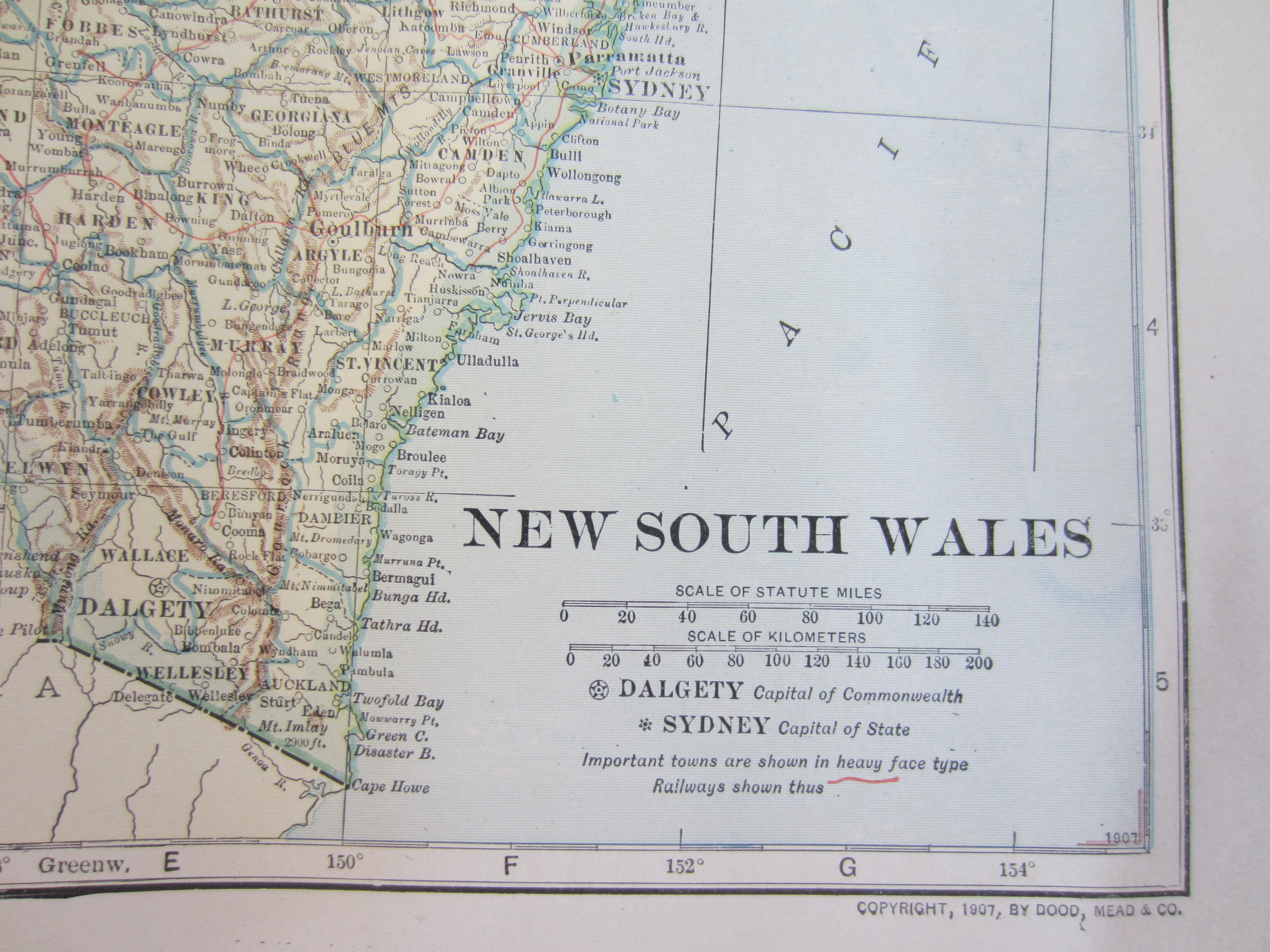
Part of a map of 1907 showing Dalgety as the capital of the Commonwealth of Australia. Mahkoolma is not shown, but was south of Bookham, which is shown in the County of Harden. Canberra, the eventual capital, did not then exist. Railway lines that existed in 1907 are shown as red lines. (The map is from the collection of the National Library of Australia.)

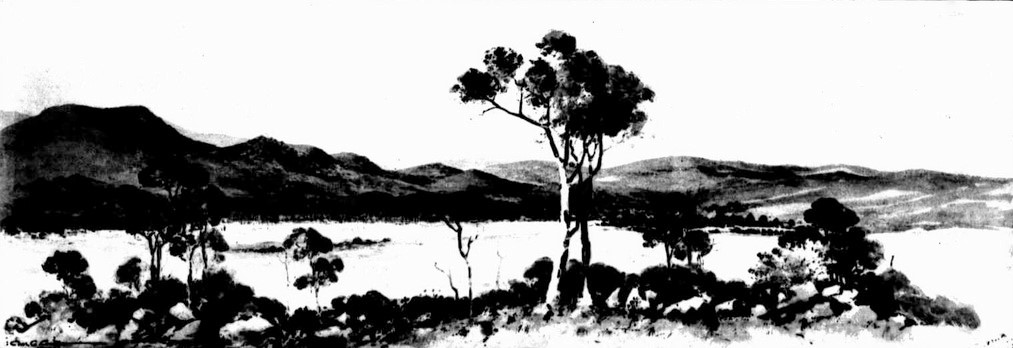
From Australian Town and Country Journal, 6 June 1906, an image taken from what is probably the work of Charles Coulter. The accompanying description reads, "The first illustration shows the proposed capital site at Mahkoolma, the view looking west from Mount Carroll, Barren Jack and Little Jack Mountains being shown on the left of the picture."

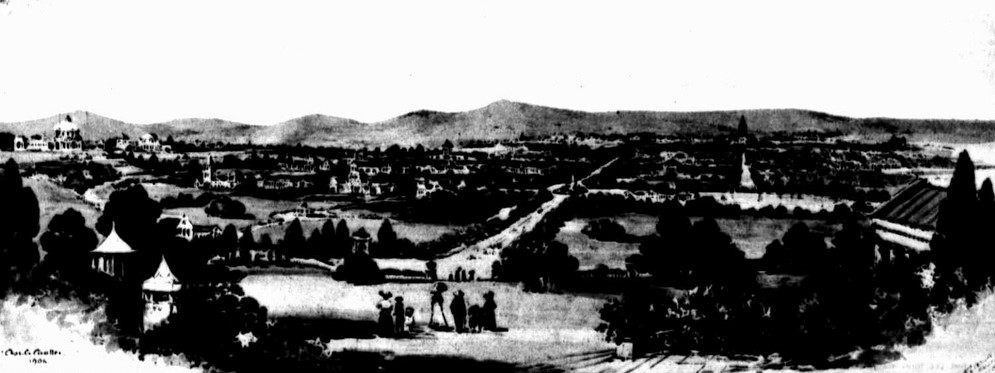
From Australian Town and Country Journal, 6 June 1906, an image taken of the work of artist Charles Coulter. The accompanying description reads, "The second is an imaginative picture, which serves to convey an idea of the appearance of the Federal city if built at Mahkoolma. This view looks towards Mount Carroll, which can be seen in the centre of the picture."
