= List of acts of the Parliament of Australia from 1904 =

This is a list of acts of the Parliament of Australia for the year 1904.

== 1904 ==
Short title, or popular name	Citation	Royal assent
Long title
Acts Interpretation Act 1904 (repealed)	No. 1 of 1904	14 June 1904
An Act for the Interpretation of Acts of Parliament and for Further Shortening their Language.
Supplementary Appropriation Act 1903-4 (repealed)	No. 2 of 1904	14 June 1904
An Act to grant and apply out of the Consolidated Revenue Fund a further sum to the service of the year ending the thirtieth day of June One thousand nine hundred and four.
Supplementary Appropriation (Works and Buildings) Act 1903-4 (repealed)	No. 3 of 1904	14 June 1904
An Act to grant and apply out of the Consolidated Revenue Fund a further sum to the service of the year ending the thirtieth day of June One thousand nine hundred and four for purposes of Additions, New Works, and Buildings.
Supply Act (No. 1) 1904-5 (repealed)	No. 4 of 1904	2 July 1904
An Act to grant and apply out of the Consolidated Revenue Fund a sum for the service of the year ending the thirtieth day of June One thousand nine hundred and five.
Supply Act (No. 2) 1904-5 (repealed)	No. 5 of 1904	28 July 1904
An Act to grant and apply out of the Consolidated Revenue Fund a sum for the service of the year ending the thirtieth day of June One thousand nine hundred and five.
Further Supplementary Appropriation Act 1902-3 (repealed)	No. 6 of 1904	28 July 1904
An Act to appropriate a further sum for the service of the year ended the thirtieth day of June One thousand nine hundred and three.
Seat of Government Act 1904 (repealed)	No. 7 of 1904	15 August 1904
An Act to determine the Seat of Government of the Commonwealth. (Repealed by Seat of Government Act 1908 (No. 24)
Supply Act (No. 3) 1904-5 (repealed)	No. 8 of 1904	25 August 1904
An Act to grant and apply out of the Consolidated Revenue Fund a sum for the service of the year ending the thirtieth day of June One thousand nine hundred and five.
Supply Act (No. 4) 1904-5 (repealed)	No. 9 of 1904	29 September 1904
An Act to grant and apply out of the Consolidated Revenue Fund a sum for the service of the year ending the thirtieth day of June One thousand nine hundred and five.
Supply Act (No. 5) 1904-5 (repealed)	No. 10 of 1904	28 October 1904
An Act to grant and apply out of the Consolidated Revenue Fund a sum for the service of the year ending the thirtieth day of June One thousand nine hundred and five.
Appropriation (Works and Buildings) Act 1904-5 (repealed)	No. 11 of 1904	25 November 1904
An Act to grant and apply a sum out of the Consolidated Revenue Fund to the service of the year ending the thirtieth day of June One thousand nine hundred and five for the purposes of Additions, New Works, Buildings, &c.
Defence Act 1904 (repealed)	No. 12 of 1904	9 December 1904
An Act to amend the Defence Act 1903. (Note: Defence Act 1903 (No. 20))
Commonwealth Conciliation and Arbitration Act 1904 (repealed)	No. 13 of 1904	15 December 1904
An Act relating to Conciliation and Arbitration for the Prevention and Settlement of Industrial Disputes extending beyond the Limits of any one State. (Repealed by Industrial Relations (Consequential Provisions) Act 1988 (No. 87)
Sea-Carriage of Goods Act 1904 (repealed)	No. 14 of 1904	15 December 1904
An Act relating to the Sea-Carriage of Goods.
Appropriation Act 1904-5 (repealed)	No. 15 of 1904	15 December 1904
An Act to grant and apply a sum out of the Consolidated Revenue Fund to the service of the year ending the thirtieth day of June One thousand nine hundred and five and to appropriate the supplies granted for such year in this session of the Parliament.

== Sources ==
- "legislation.gov.au".
