= List of acts of the Parliament of Australia from 1908 =

This is a list of acts of the Parliament of Australia for the year 1908.

== 1908 ==
Short title, or popular name	Citation	Royal assent
Long title
	No. 1 of 1908	
	No. 2 of 1908	
Quarantine Act 1908 (repealed)	No. 3 of 1908	30 March 1908
An Act relating to Quarantine. (Repealed by Biosecurity (Consequential Amendments and Transitional Provisions) Act 2015 (No. 62))
	No. 4 of 1908	
	No. 5 of 1908	
	No. 6 of 1908	
	No. 7 of 1908	
	No. 8 of 1908	
	No. 9 of 1908	
	No. 10 of 1908	
	No. 11 of 1908	
	No. 12 of 1908	
	No. 13 of 1908	
	No. 14 of 1908	
Surplus Revenue Act 1908	No. 15 of 1908	10 June 1908
An Act relating to the payment to the several States of the Surplus Revenue of the Commonwealth.
Parliamentary Papers Act 1908	No. 16 of 1908	10 June 1908
An Act Relating to the Publication of Parliamentary Papers.
	No. 17 of 1908	
	No. 18 of 1908	
	No. 19 of 1908	
	No. 20 of 1908	
	No. 21 of 1908	
	No. 22 of 1908	
	No. 23 of 1908	
Seat of Government Act 1908	No. 24 of 1908	14 December 1908
An Act to Determine the Seat of Government of the Commonwealth.
	No. 25 of 1908	
	No. 26 of 1908	
	No. 27 of 1908	

== Sources ==
- "legislation.gov.au".
