= One Tree Hill (Australian Capital Territory) =

Hill in Yass Valley LGA, New South Wales, Australia

- Location within Australian Capital Territory

Highest point
- Elevation: 863 m (2,831 ft)
- Coordinates: 35°08′31.5043″S 149°05′28.8183″E

Geography
- Location: Australian Capital Territory / New South Wales, Australia

One Tree Hill is a peak near the village of Hall and the Canberra suburb of Taylor. Its trigonometrical station lies on the border between the Australian Capital Territory and New South Wales, Australia.

It is at the north-eastern end of the longest straight-line section of the border, with Mount Coree at the south-western end. North and east of One Tree Hill, the border is formed by the watershed of the Molonglo River catchment. One-Tree Trigonometrical Station is nominated in the description of the Australian Capital Territory, in the Second Schedule of the Seat of Government Acceptance Act 1909. In 2022, it was announced that there would negotiations on a change to the straight-line section of the border; the border south-west from One Tree Hill will follow the current straight line, but only to the point where it intersects Ginninderra Creek. The other straight-line from Mount Coree will end at the Murrumbidgee River, with the land enclosed by the right bank of the Murrumbidgee and the left bank of Ginninderra Creek to become part of the ACT.

One Tree Hill lies on the traditional lands of Ngunnawal people.

Robert Dixon in 1830 and Robert Hoddle, between 1830 and 1836, used One Tree Hill as a high point from where to view the area and as a landmark from which they took bearings, while surveying the area.

It was the location at which Charles Scrivener began his detailed topographical survey of the area for the new capital site of Canberra. Later, it was an important location for the survey of the border of the new Australian Capital Territory.

One Tree Hill is a popular walking destination and lies on the Canberra Centenary Trail. The lookout at the top of the hill provides a panoramic view in all directions.

There is a Telstra telecommunications tower on the hill.
