= Jervis Bay Territory Acceptance Act 1915 =

Act of the Parliament of Australia establishing the Jervis Bay Territory

Parliament of Australia
- Long title: An Act to provide for the Acceptance of certain Territory Surrendered by the State of New South Wales to the Commonwealth
- Citation: No. 19 of 1915
- Territorial extent: Australia
- Enacted by: Senate
- Enacted: 20 May 1915
- Enacted by: House of Representatives
- Enacted: 8 July 1915
- Royal assent: 14 July 1915

Legislative history

First chamber: Senate
- Bill title: Jervis Bay Territory Acceptance Bill
- Introduced by: Edward Russell
- First reading: 13 May 1915
- Second reading: 14 May 1915
- Third reading: 20 May 1915

Second chamber: House of Representatives
- Bill title: Jervis Bay Territory Acceptance Bill
- Member(s) in charge: William Archibald
- First reading: 20 May 1915
- Second reading: 8 July 1915
- Third reading: 8 July 1915

Amended by
- No. 70 of 1955, No. 216 of 1973, No. 164 of 1986, No. 109 of 1988 (consequential of No. 106 of 1988), No. 28 of 1991, No. 143 of 2001

Related legislation
- Seat of Government Surrender Act 1915 (No. 9 of 1915 (NSW))

Summary
- Allows for the transfer of the land now known as the Jervis Bay Territory from New South Wales to the Commonwealth.
- Status: Amended

The Jervis Bay Territory Acceptance Act 1915 is an act of the Parliament of Australia which followed the New South Wales Seat of Government Surrender Act 1915. The Act created the Territory of Jervis Bay, subject to the laws of the Federal Capital Territory (FCT). While the Act's use of the language of "annexed" is sometimes interpreted as implying that the Jervis Bay Territory was to form part of the Federal Capital Territory, the accepted legal position is that it has been a legally distinct territory from its creation, despite being subject to FCT/ACT law and (prior to ACT self-government in 1988) being administratively treated as part of the FCT/ACT.

== See also ==
- History of the Australian Capital Territory
- Territorial evolution of Australia
