= Seat of Government Surrender Act 1909 =

1909 New South Wales law ceding land for the Federal Capital Territory of Australia

Parliament of New South Wales
- Long title: An Act to provide for the surrender of territory in connection with the Seat of Government of the Commonwealth, and to ratify and confirm an agreement for that and other purposes
- Citation: 1909 No. 14
- Enacted by: Parliament of New South Wales
- Royal assent: 14 December 1909

Related legislation
- Seat of Government Surrender Act 1915
- Status: Current legislation

The Seat of Government Surrender Act 1909 is an act of the New South Wales Parliament which completed the transfer of land from New South Wales to establish the Federal Capital Territory as the seat of Commonwealth government. The act became law on 14 December 1909, the day after the Seat of Government Acceptance Act 1909 had been passed by the Commonwealth government.

== See also ==
- History of the Australian Capital Territory
