= Naas (valley) =

Valley in Australian Capital Territory, Australia

Coordinates: 35.633°S 149.067°E

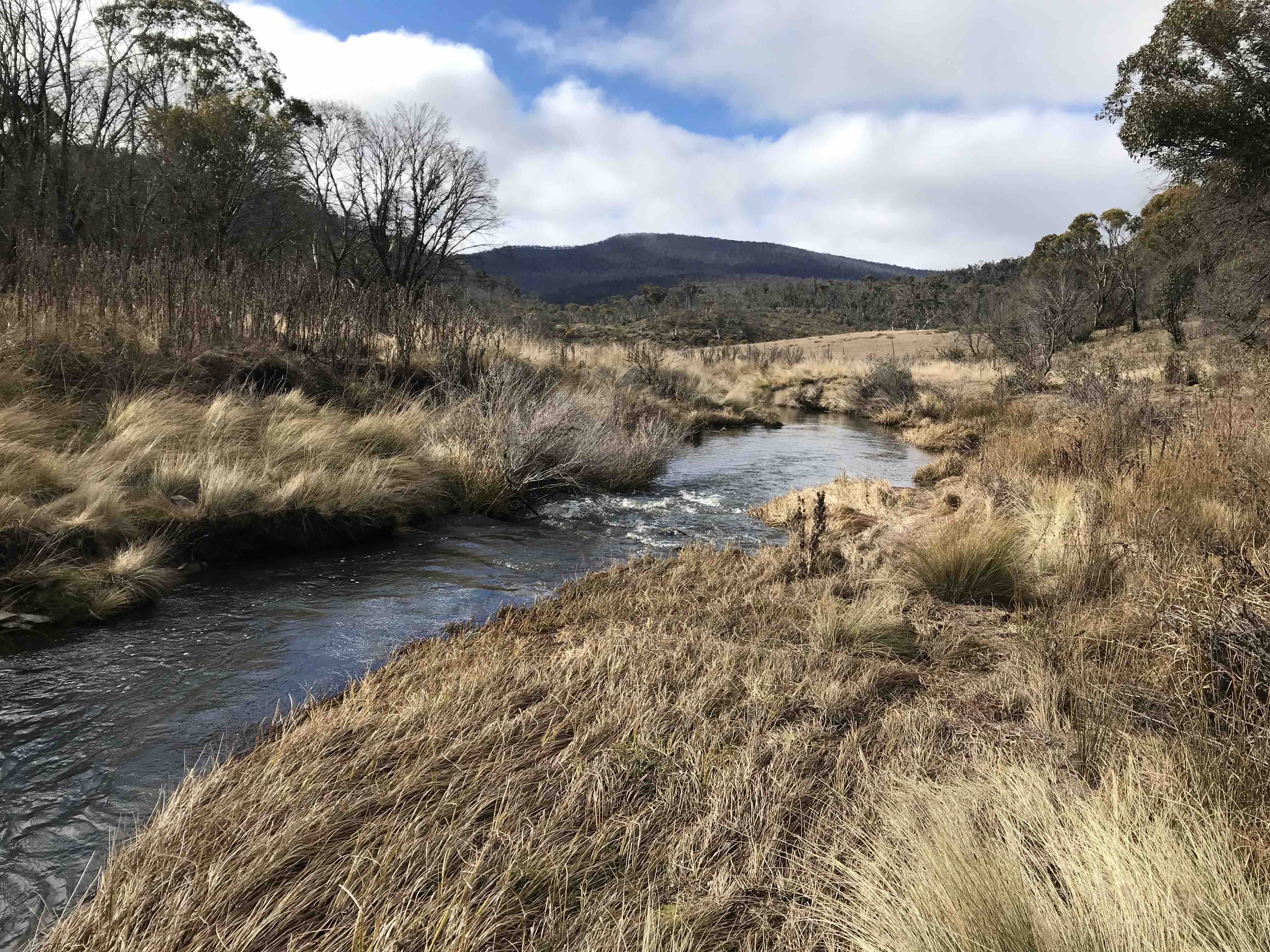
Naas Creek

Naas Valley is an area south of Canberra, Australia in the Brindabella Ranges which was first settled by Europeans in 1834. The watershed of Naas Creek forms the southern and south-eastern boundary of the Australian Capital Territory, as specified in the Seat of Government Acceptance Act 1909.

The first European settler of the Naas Valley was William Herbert who was a squatter. However, by 1848 Herbert was granted 2428 hectares of land on a leasehold basis.

The area is now mostly part of Namadgi National Park.
