= Dalgety, New South Wales =

Dalgety
- Town
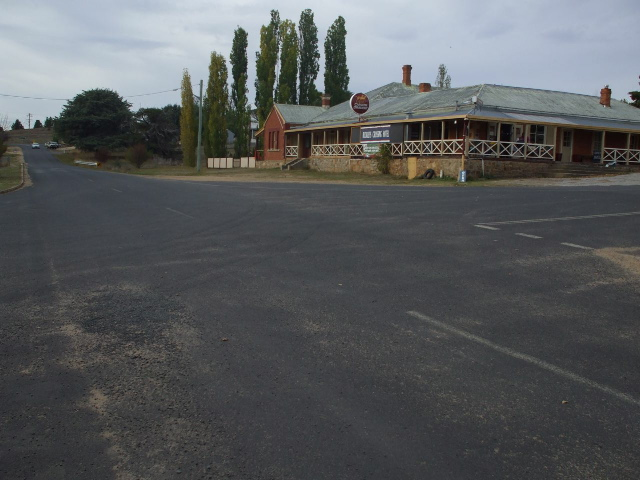
- Main street of Dalgety and the Buckley's Crossing Hotel

- Interactive map of Dalgety
- Coordinates: 36°30′0″S 148°50′0″E
- Country: Australia
- State: New South Wales
- LGA: Snowy Monaro Regional Council
- Location: 51 km (32 mi) from Cooma; 452 km (281 mi) from Sydney
- Established: 1832

Government
  - State electorate: Monaro
  - Federal division: Eden-Monaro

Population
  - Total: 252 (SAL 2021)
- Postcode: 2628

Dalgety is a small town in New South Wales, Australia, on the banks of the Snowy River between Melbourne and Sydney.

The town is located at what was once an important river crossing along the Travelling Stock route from Gippsland to the Snowy Mountains High Country dating from the 1840s.

== History ==
The first settlement was originally known as Buckley's Crossing after Edward Buckley who established a farm near the river crossing in 1832. It was renamed Barnes Crossing in 1848, by which time it had become an important waypoint on the stock route between Gippsland in Victoria and the Snowy Mountains in New South Wales. In 1874 the town was formally surveyed and named Dalgety after the maiden name of the wife of surveyor J. R. Campbell. Like the founder of Dalgety and Company she was a grandchild of a Colonel Alexander Dalgety.

At the time of the survey the population was 23 and it was recorded that a punt was operating across the river. A Catholic school opened in 1874 to cater for the children of Irish gold prospectors, and the first bridge over the river was constructed in 1888.

The town also became a meeting place between white settlers and local Aborigines, who would camp along the river bank on the way to the Snowy Mountains. The Thaua people and Ngarigo people lived in this area seasonally.

=== Location for national capital ===
Section 125 of the Constitution of the Commonwealth ordained that the 'Seat of Government' 'shall be in the State of New South Wales, and be distant not less than one hundred miles from Sydney', with the specific location to be decided by the Commonwealth Parliament.

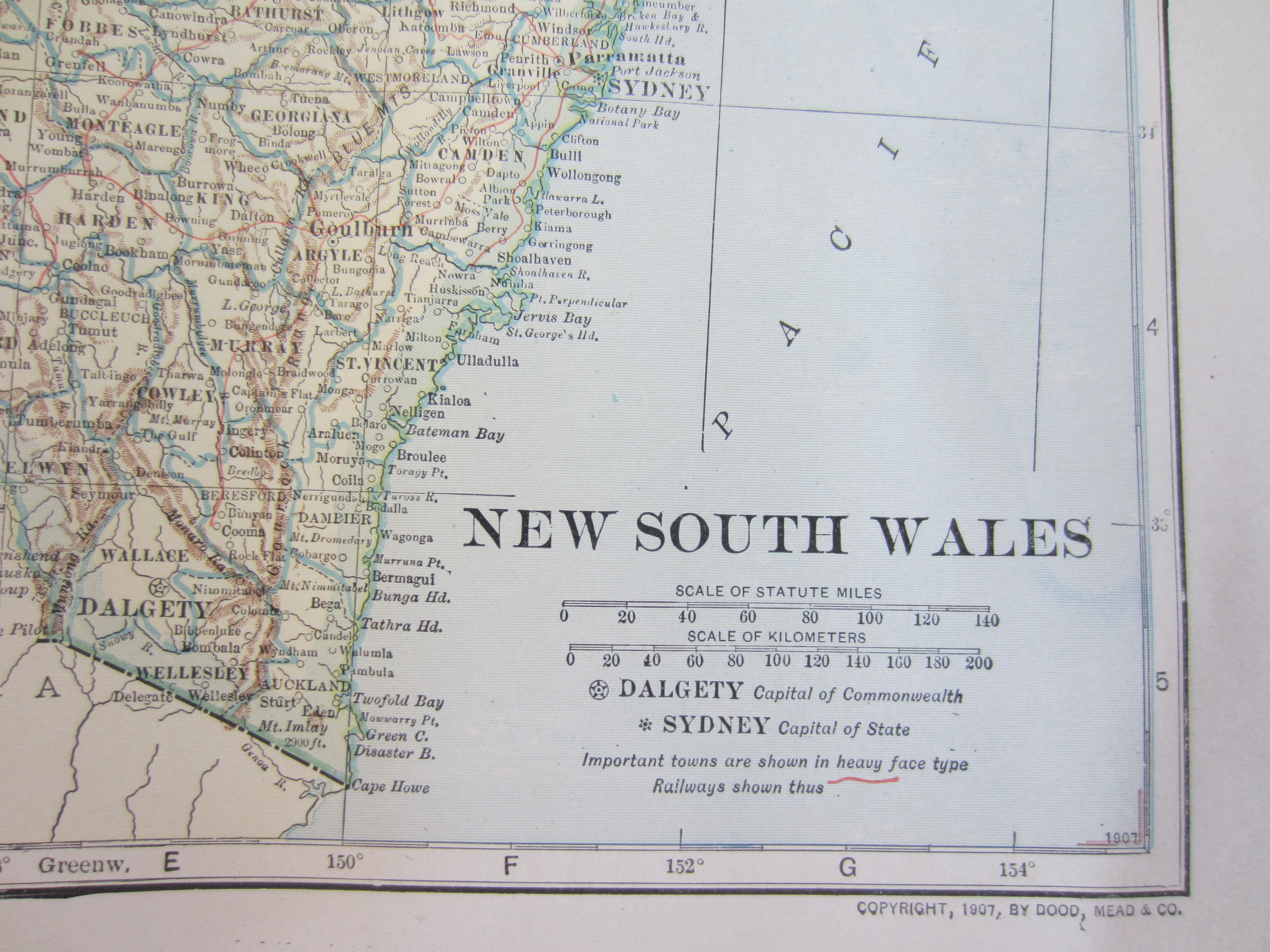
Extract of map showing Dalgety as the Commonwealth Capital (1907), from Collection of National Library of Australia.

In 1903 a Federal Royal Commission proposed Dalgety as the location for Australia's national capital city. The choice was ostensibly based on several criteria, including climate, food supply, land ownership and ability to support major industries, although official investigators conceded the site was 'very rough', 'treeless', and 'somewhat exposed [to] high winds'. The recommendation was implemented in the Seat of Government Act 1904, and emphatically supported by the prime minister, George Reid, and the Minister for the Interior, John Forrest, even though he had told the Federal Australasian Convention of 1897 that 'only lunatics' would site the capital in the interior of the Commonwealth.

The decision was immediately opposed by the Parliament of New South Wales which argued that Dalgety was too close to Melbourne and too far from Sydney. A more practical objection was the distance to the main Sydney-Melbourne railway line and the expense involved in constructing a spur to the proposed capital. Dalgety's cause had strong advocates including the local member Austin Chapman, Andrew Fisher, and John Forrest, as well as more general support from Victoria. Chris Watson, the Federal Labor leader and a former Prime Minister of Australia, and N.S.W. Premier Joseph Curruthers, despite their differing political ideologies, were tacitly cooperating, both aiming to overturn the selection of Dalgety. After the effective elimination of Mahkoolma as a site, Watson became a supporter of Canberra, urging Carruthers to back it. Canberra emerged as a rival site to Dalgety, also winning the support of the influential South Australian, Senator Josiah Symon.

The matter eventually was settled, in October 1908, when parliamentarians voted on the capital site in a series of ballots, during which sites were eliminated progressively. In the ninth and last ballot, Dalgety had lost to 'Yass-Canberra' by 33 votes to 39. Subsequently, the Seat of Government Act 1908 was passed, and Canberra became the capital.

Considerable planning effort was made, during the period that Dalgety was the selected site of the new capital, including planning for the water supply and hydro-electric power generation—a large reservoir was proposed for the Snowy River at Jindabyne—and the routes for future rail lines.

== Geography ==
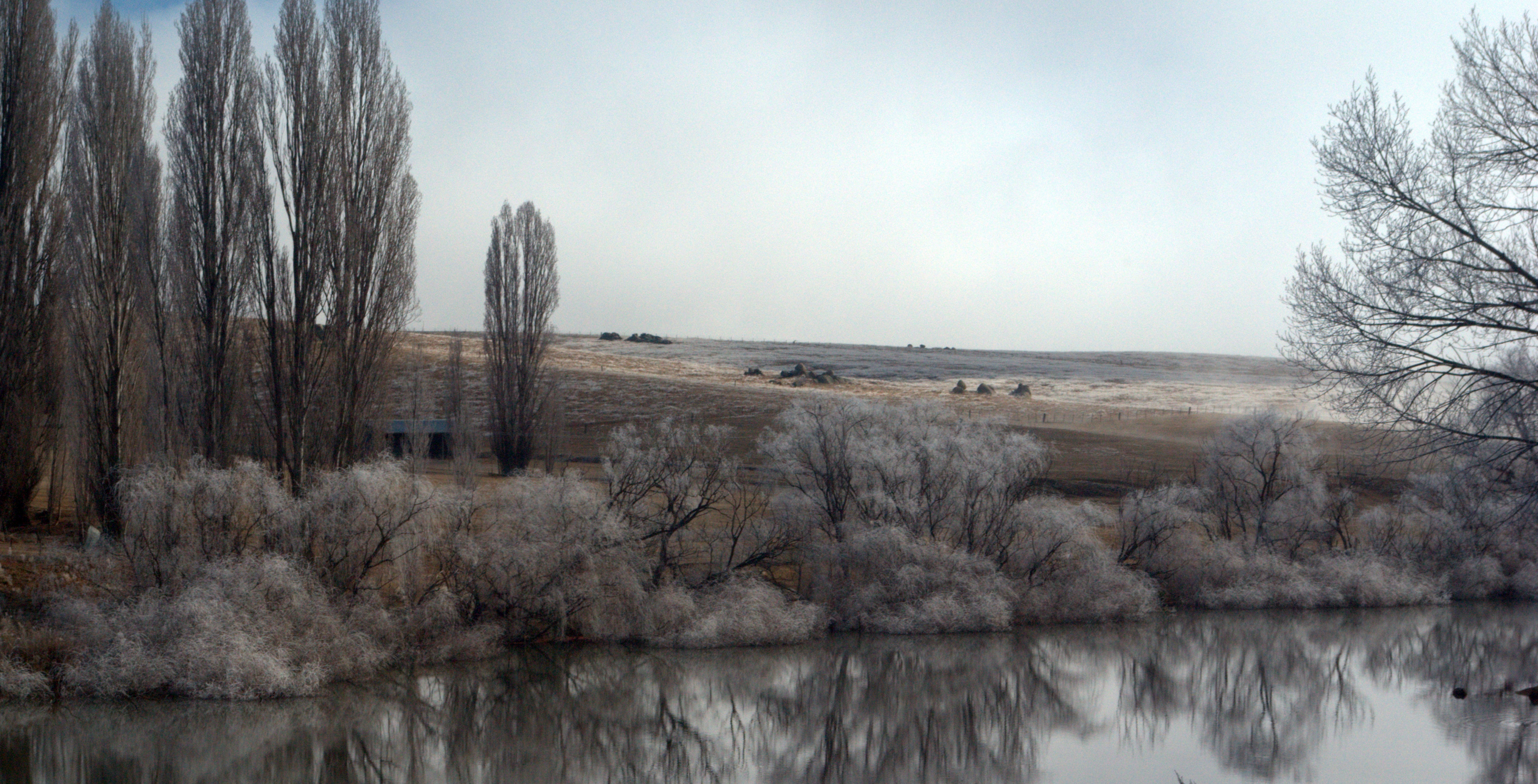
Dalgety is situated on the Snowy River, seen here from a bridge on the west side of the town.

Situated on the Monaro Plains and in the rain shadow of the Snowy Mountains, Dalgety is a relatively dry area of rolling hills with granite boulders scattered across the landscape.

The town depends on the Snowy River for water supplies. In October 2007 the New South Wales Department of Water and Energy recommended a cut in river flows through the nearby Lake Jindabyne, to a level which may require Dalgety to import drinking water.
