= Seat of Government Acceptance Act 1909 =

Act of the federal Parliament of Australia creating the ACT

The Seat of Government Acceptance Act 1909 is an Australian Commonwealth Government act, that in conjunction with the Seat of Government Surrender Act 1909 transferred land from the state of New South Wales to the Commonwealth for the creation of the Federal Capital Territory (now Australian Capital Territory).

The act was signed on 13 December 1909 by the Governor-General Lord Dudley. The Seat of Government Surrender Act 1909 was passed by the New South Wales government the following day, creating a site for the national capital in law.

== Boundaries ==
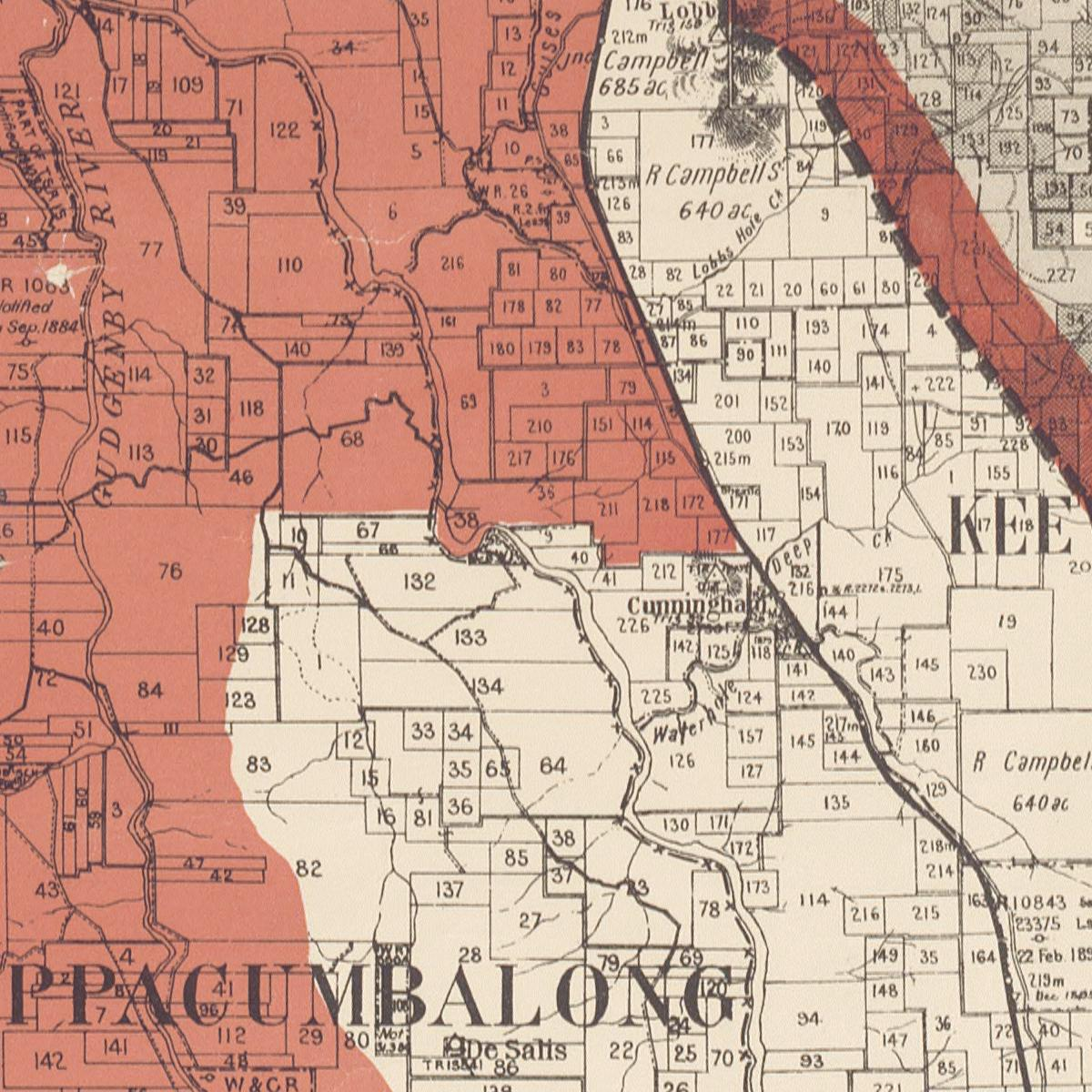
1909 cadastral map showing the small part of the border near 35°35′14″S 149°7′0″E determined by property boundaries in the parishes of Keewong, County of Murray and Cuppacumbalong, County of Cowley

The act specified the land to be surrendered to the Commonwealth as being bounded by (described in clockwise direction):

- The Goulburn to Cooma railway line in the east,
- Part of the Parish of Keewong in the County of Murray to the Murrumbidgee River, down the river a short distance (to the north), and then portions of the Parish of Cuppacumbalong in the County of Cowley.
- The eastern watershed of the Gudgenby River
- The eastern and southern watersheds of Naas Creek
- The southern and western watersheds of the Cotter River (which passes through Bimberi Peak), and north to Mount Coree
- A line north-east from Mount Coree to One-Tree Trigonometrical Station
- The watershed of the Molonglo River south-east to where it meets the railway line.

== Water rights ==
The act specified the following arrangements concerning water rights, for catchments outside the above boundaries:

- The Commonwealth has paramount rights to the waters of the Queanbeyan and Molonglo Rivers and their tributaries, which lie to the east of the Goulburn to Cooma Railway.
- NSW has secondary rights to the water from these catchments, subject to the use and requirements of the Commonwealth.
- NSW consents to the construction by the Commonwealth in NSW of works necessary for control and use of those waters.
- NSW reserves from sale, lease, and occupation Crown lands within catchment areas of the Queanbeyan and Molonglo Rivers.
- NSW undertakes not to pollute and undertakes to protect from pollution the waters of the Queanbeyan and Molonglo Rivers.

== Jervis Bay ==
The act also described the territories to be granted to the Commonwealth in Jervis Bay, which became the Jervis Bay Territory in 1915:

- Separate portions of land in the Eastern Division, Land District of Nowra, County of St. Vincent, in several different parishes: in the Parish of Bherwerre parcels of land of 2 square miles (5.2 km^{2}), 132 acres (0.53 km^{2}), 412 acres (1.67 km^{2}); in the Parish of Beecroft parcels of 520 acres (2.1 km^{2}), 531 acres (2.15 km^{2}), 424 acres (1.72 km^{2}); in the Parish of Farnham 103 acres (0.42 km^{2}); in the Parish of Nowra 180 acres (0.73 km^{2}).
