= Seat of Government Act 1908 =

Act of the Parliament of Australia, currently registered as C2004C00607

The Seat of Government Act 1908 was enacted by the Australian Government on 14 December 1908. The act selected the Yass-Queanbeyan region as the site for Canberra, the new capital city of Australia.

The act repealed the earlier Seat of Government Act 1904 which had previously selected a site at Dalgety for the new capital. The actual creation of the Federal Capital Territory (now Australian Capital Territory) did not occur until after Charles Robert Scrivener had surveyed the area and defined a potential border. The Seat of Government Acceptance Act 1909 and Seat of Government Surrender Act 1909 transferred the land from the state of New South Wales to the Commonwealth to create the territory. The new territory's laws were created through the Seat of Government (Administration) Act 1910.

== See also ==
- Government of New South Wales
