= Seat of Government Surrender Act 1915 =

Law of New South Wales, Australia

The Seat of Government Surrender Act 1915 was an Act of the New South Wales Parliament transferring land from New South Wales to establish the Jervis Bay Territory as part of the Federal Capital Territory. The Jervis Bay Territory Acceptance Act 1915 was the corresponding Commonwealth Act accepting the transfer of land.
