= Seat of Government Act 1904 =

Act of the Parliament of Australia

Parliament of Australia
- Long title: An Act to determine the Seat of Government of the Commonwealth.
- Assented to: 15 August 1904
- Repealed: 14 December 1908
- Introduced by: Watson government

Related legislation
- Seat of Government Act 1908
- Status: Repealed

The Seat of Government Act 1904 was an Act of the Parliament of Australia that provided that the "seat of government of the Commonwealth" (i.e., the national capital) should be within 17 miles (27 km) of Dalgety, New South Wales.

The site turned out to be unacceptable to the Government of New South Wales, due partly to its distance from Sydney and proximity to Victoria. A more practical objection was the distance to the main Sydney-Melbourne railway line and the expense involved in constructing a spur to the proposed capital.

The Act was repealed in 1908 by the Seat of Government Act 1908, which selected Canberra as the new site for the territory.
