= Woodstock railway station =

Woodstock station or Woodstock railway station may refer to:

- Woodstock station (Ontario), a Via Rail station in Woodstock, Ontario, Canada
- Woodstock railway station (Cape Town), a Metrorail station in Cape Town, South Africa
- Woodstock station (Illinois), a Metra station in Woodstock, Illinois
- Blenheim and Woodstock railway station, a disused railway station in Woodstock, England
- Woodstock railway station, New South Wales, a heritage-listed former railway station in Woodstock, New South Wales, Australia
