= Charles White (writer) =

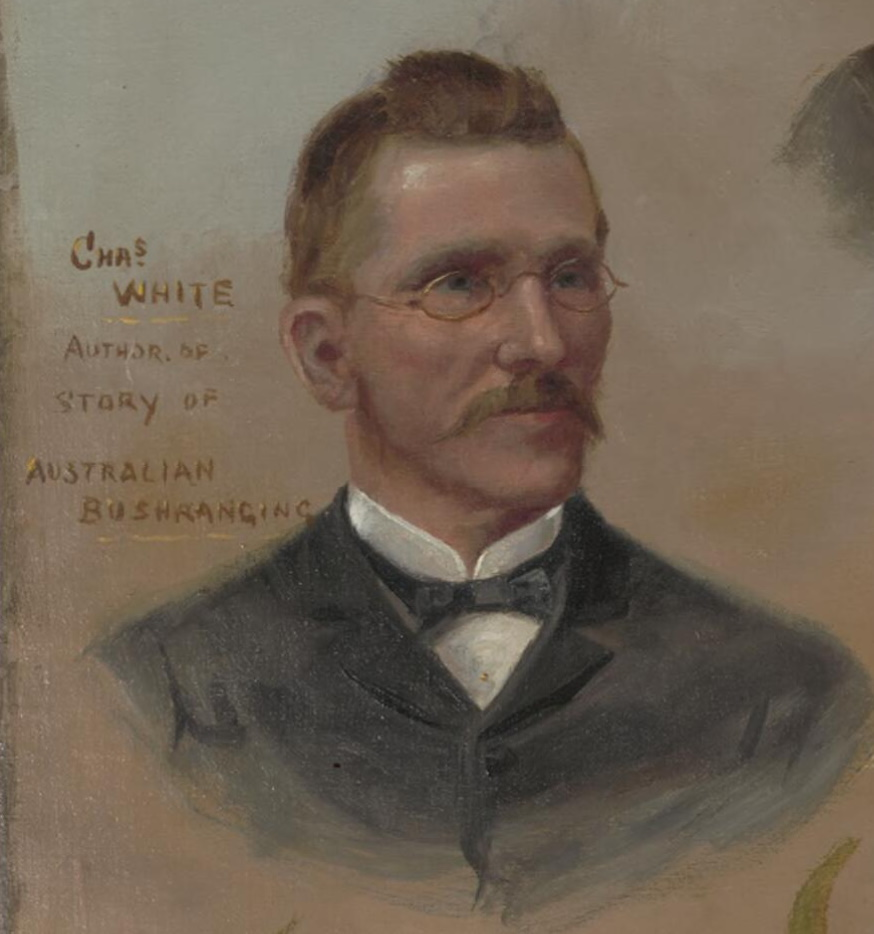
- Portrait of Charles White, detail from P. W. Marony's 1894 painting
- Born: 1845; Bathurst
- Died: 22 December 1922 (aged 76–77); Mosman, NSW
- Resting place: Gore Hill cemetery
- Occupations: editor; journalist; author; historian
- Writing career
- Pen name: The Chatterer

Charles White (1845 – 22 December 1922), was an Australian journalist, author and historian, notable for his books on bushranging and other aspects of Australian history.

== Biography ==
White was born at Bathurst in 1845, the third son of John Charles White and Myra (née Oakey). His father was a bank clerk and Methodist lay preacher.

In late 1858 John Charles White purchased the Bathurst Free Press and Mining Journal newspaper. (Note: John Charles White was recorded as the sole proprietor from the first issue of 1859 The paper remained in family ownership until 1904.) Charles was taken on as an apprentice at the newspaper. He taught himself shorthand and was employed as the police roundsman.

Reports of the activities and crimes of bushrangers became increasingly common during the 1860s in the Bathurst and surrounding districts. White wrote about these incidents in his role as journalist, which led to a lifelong interest in the lives and crimes of Australian bushrangers. Colonial newspapers invariably professed opposition to bushranging, but most published regular and detailed accounts of the bushrangers’ activities and court appearances. Articles from newspapers covering the districts where bushrangers operated were often reprinted across the colony and beyond, indicating a high level of interest in the subject.

Charles White and Sarah Beattie were married on 3 May 1871 at Young. His wife’s younger sister, Mary-Ann Beattie, had married Donald Cameron of 'Mary Vale' station, Woodhouselee, near Goulburn, in 1864. Their eldest child was the prolific Australian writer Mary Gilmore.

By January 1885 White and his younger brother Gloster had taken over from their father as proprietors of the Bathurst Free Press, with Charles taking on the role as editor and Gloster as business manager.

White had an interest in writing about Australian history. He scrupulously collected material and records to use as a basis for his historic writings. In the late 1880s Charles White’s "lengthy series of historical sketches", under the title 'Early Australian History', began to be published in the Bathurst Free Press. Described as articles "bearing upon the work of Australian colonisation and convict life in New South Wales and Van Diemen’s Land", the publishing project was locally advertised, including in the rival newspaper Bathurst Post. The first part of 'Early Australian History' was published on 6 October 1888. White used the pseudonym 'The Chatterer' for these early articles. In 1889 Parts I and II of his 'Early Australia History' were released in book form as Convict Life in New South Wales and Van Diemen’s Land, printed in the White brothers' newspaper office at Bathurst. Charles White’s historical writings display “painstaking scholarship and a fluent, uncluttered style free of romanticism”.

In September 1891 advertisements began to appear for Part IV of 'Early Australian History' – 'The Story of Australian Bushranging' – which began to be serialised in the Bathurst Free Press in October 1891, with the advertisements and serialised articles identifying 'The Chatterer' as "Mr C. White".

During the Federalism debates of the 1890s White exerted his influence as an editor to use the Bathurst Free Press to support free trade and Federation. The local Federalist movement led to the holding of the People's Federal Convention at Bathurst from 16 to 21 November 1896. During the 1901 election campaign leading to the formation of the first federal parliament, the dominant ideological divide was between the protectionists versus the free traders. White, using his newspaper, was very publicly on the side of the Free Trade party. At an election rally held in Bathurst on Tuesday evening, 26 March 1901, speakers addressed a crowd of two thousand from the balcony of the Park Hotel in support of the Free Trade candidate Sydney Smith. During the rally supporters of protectionism attempted to disrupt the meeting, leading to censorious comments in the Bathurst Free Press such as: "The tactics adopted by the Protectionist hoodlums, hirelings, and hobbledehoys were absolutely disgraceful, and will remain as an indelible stigma on the name of Protection in Bathurst." White added: "These inane and empty-headed descendants of the Goths and Vandals roared themselves hoarse in order to stifle freedom of speech, and not satisfied with bellowing and conducting themselves like wild animals from a menagerie, they gave vent to their low, cowardly, unmanly, and despicable instincts by hurling rotten and other eggs at the speakers and others on the platform." The election resulted in a win for Smith (in the Macquarie electorate). White's forceful criticism of leading protectionists and the movement in general gave rise to considerable local hostility. In February 1902 the partnership between Charles and Gloster White "carrying on business as Printers and Newspaper Proprietors" was dissolved "by Mutual Consent". White sold his share of the newspaper to his brother Gloster and moved to Randwick.

On several occasions he acted as editor for the Lithgow Mercury.

In late 1905 John Vane, who had been a member of John Gilbert and Ben Hall's gang of bushrangers for a brief period in 1863, visited White in Sydney, giving him "an account of the inner life of the gang with which he had been associated". Vane died soon afterwards (on 30 January 1906 in Cowra hospital).

White was employed as an associate editor in the early days of The Farmer & Settler newspaper, first published in February 1906 in Sydney as the official organ of the New South Wales Farmers' and Settlers' Association. He was still so employed in December 1909, for most of that time under Harry J. Stephens.

In the early hours of the morning of 18 January 1911 a fire started in the study of White's Randwick house. The fire brigade managed to confine the blaze to the study, but all of White's records were destroyed.

From February 1917 to September 1919 a series of articles written by White under the title 'The Rise and Progress of the West: The Story of Settlement Beyond the Blue Mountains' was published in The Farmer & Settler.

White died on 22 December 1922 at his residence, 'Heatherdene', in Milner Street, Mosman, aged 77 years. He was buried in the Methodist section of Gore Hill cemetery. His son Percy Charles White ( – 28 September 1950) has been named as the founder of the newspaper. was publisher of the Farmer & Settler, and his sons Norman and Paddy continued as directors.

== Bibliography ==
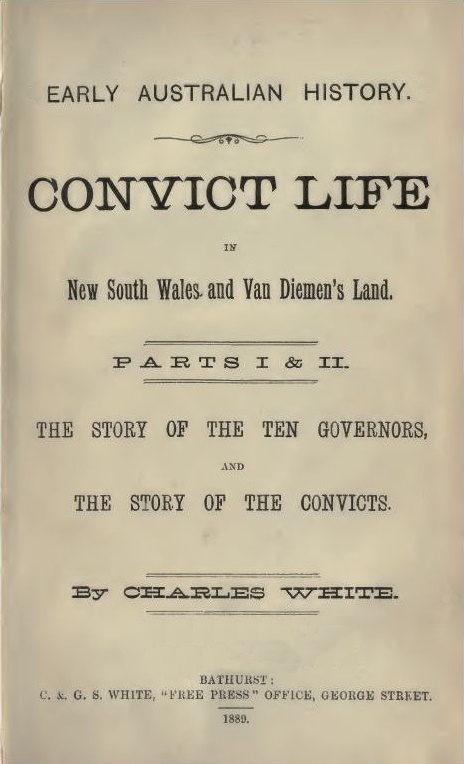
Title page, Early Australian History: Convict Life in New South Wales and Van Diemen's Land (1889) by Charles White.

- Early Australian History: Convict Life in New South Wales and Van Diemen's Land, parts I & II (1889), Bathurst: C. & G. S. White Free Press Office.
- Early Australian History: The Story of the Bushrangers, part IV (1892), Bathurst: C. & G. S. White.
- History of Australian Bushranging: Vol. I, The Early Days to 1862 (1900), Sydney: Angus & Robertson.
- History of Australian Bushranging: 1863-1880, Ben Hall to the Kelly Gang (1903), Sydney: Angus & Robertson.
- The Story of the Blacks: The Aborigines of Australia (early version published in serial form in the Bathurst Free Press and Mining Journal, commencing 14 September 1889; on-line version serialised in the Windsor and Richmond Gazette commencing 30 April 1904).
- Old Convict Days in Australia (1906), Sydney: Marchant & Co.
- John Vane, bushranger (1908), Sydney: N.S.W. Bookstall Co.
- Short-lived Bushrangers (1909), Sydney: N.S.W. Bookstall Co.
- History of Australian Bushranging : Early Days (1910), Sydney: Angus & Robertson.
- History of Australian bushranging, 1863 to 1869 (1910), Sydney: Angus & Robertson.
- Australian bushranging (1921), Sydney: N.S.W. Bookstall Co.
- Ben Hall (1921), Sydney: N.S.W. Bookstall Co.
- Captain Moonlite (1921), Sydney: N.S.W. Bookstall Co.
- Gardiner, “King of the Road” (1921), Sydney: N.S.W. Bookstall Co.
- Martin Cash (1921), Sydney: N.S.W. Bookstall Co.
- The Kelly Gang (1921), Sydney: N.S.W. Bookstall Co.

== Sources ==
- Wilde, William H., Hooton, J., Andrews, B. (eds.) The Oxford Companion to Australian Literature 2nd ed. Oxford University Press, Melbourne 1994. ISBN 0 19 553381 X
