= John Vane (bushranger) =

Australian bushranger (1842–1906)

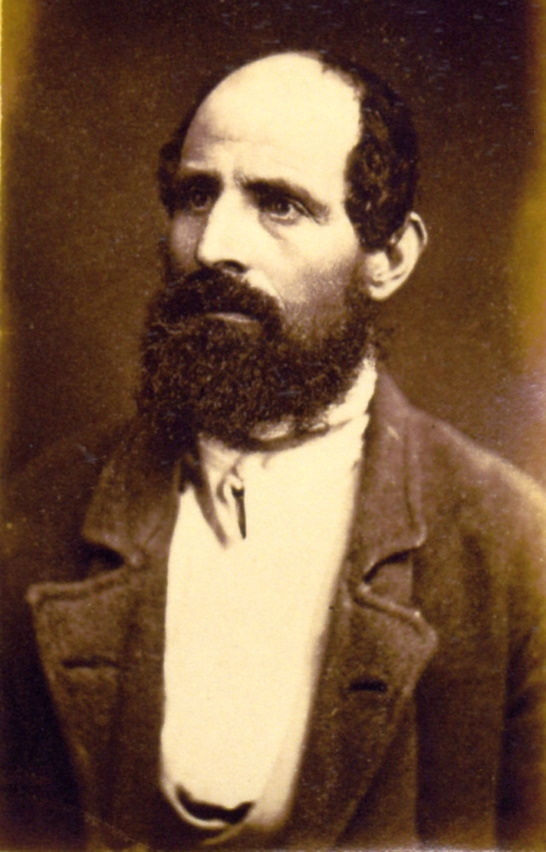
- John Vane, photographed at Darlinghurst Gaol in 1880.
- Born: 16 June 1842; Jerrys Plains, New South Wales, Australia
- Died: 30 January 1906 (aged 63); Cowra, New South Wales
- Resting place: Woodstock, New South Wales

John Vane (16 June 1842 – 30 January 1906) was an Australian bushranger who joined with John Gilbert's gang for a short period during 1863. He rode with Gilbert, Ben Hall, John O’Meally and his friend Mick Burke, all of whom eventually met violent deaths. Burke, who had been Vane's childhood friend, died in a violent gun-fight at 'Dunn's Plains', near Rockley. Vane managed to avoid the fate of his companions when he gave himself up. In 1905 Vane collaborated with author and newspaper editor, Charles White, in recording his recollections of the period he spent as part of the bushranging gangs led by Gilbert, Hall and O'Meally. Vane's biography, edited by White, was published in 1908 (two years after Vane's death).

== Biography ==
=== Early life ===
John Vane was born on 16 June 1842 at Jerrys Plains on the Hunter River, the fifth-born of the children of William Vane and Ann (née Miller). In about 1848 William and Ann Vane and their growing family relocated to the Kelso parish near Bathurst, and soon afterwards to 'Teasdale Park' station (south-east of Carcoar). William Vane found work on pastoral runs, primarily employed as a timber cutter and splitter. In 1850 the family were living on Hanrahan's station at the Weddin Mountains to the west of Grenfell and the following year at 'Kempfield' station in the Trunkey Creek district where they remained for about five years. During the period at 'Kempfield' young Johnny worked as a shepherd, looking after a flock of sheep on the unfenced run. Vane later claimed it was with his wages as a shepherd that enabled his father to pay the deposit on a block of land in the Trunkey Creek district.

In 1856 fourteen year-old John Vane was apprenticed to a blacksmith and wheelwright in Bathurst, where he remained for two years. Having grown "tired of confinement and monotonous work on low pay" Vane "'cleared out' for the Turon gold diggings", about 30 miles north-east of Bathurst, where he found work at good wages. By the early 1860s Vane was working for Mr. Murray and his partner, in charge of a bullock team carrying goods between Orange and their pastoral station on the Lachlan River.

After returning to his parents' farm near Trunkey Creek, Vane joined up with several other young men of his acquaintance, including Mick Burke and Mick's cousin Jim Burke, and engaged in 'cattle duffing' in the hilly country west of Trunkey Creek where strayed and unbranded cattle could be found. On their first venture into cattle stealing Vane and his companions gathered a mob and drove them to Neville (then known as 'Number One') from where they were sold “to different parties in the district” for an average of £5 per head.

=== Armed robbery ===
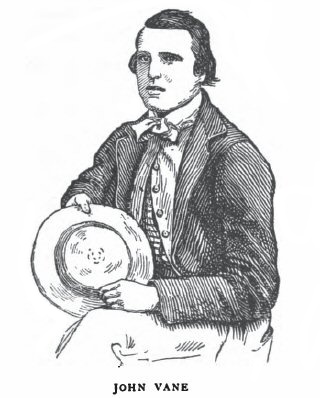
John Vane in 1861 (aged 19 years); illustration from White's History of Australian Bushranging, Vol. II (1903).

Vane's first foray into armed robbery is recounted in his biography written with Charles White. He describes how he and Jim Burke, after selling a mob of cattle they had rounded up, were "drinking and otherwise amusing ourselves" at Thomas Chesher's public house near 'Teasdale Park' station (about half-way along the road between Trunkey Creek and Blayney); they noticed a Chinese man riding past the inn along the road towards Bathurst, probably having come from the Trunkey diggings. On a whim Vane grabbed the landlord's revolver from the bar and a box of caps (though without ammunition) and he and Burke then rode after the man and bailed him up with the unloaded weapon. The man claimed to have no money, but eventually they found a bag hidden in the horse's tail containing a £5 note and two ounces of gold, which the two young lawbreakers stole and then returned to the hotel.

On the Thursday evening, 12 February 1863, three men with their faces blackened arrived at Michael Boyce's inn at Long Swamp, 12 miles from Rockley, and held up the publican, his wife and customers Joseph Sergeant and his wife. One of the men was armed with a revolver and the occupants were robbed of eleven shillings and sixpence. In his biography John Vane claims it was he and Jim Burke who, unarmed, tried to rob Boyce's public-house, but those present "soon saw that we did not mean anything serious" and invited them to join the group in a game of cards. However, Boyce reported the robbery to the Bathurst police and after investigations were undertaken, three young men from the district were charged with the crime – John Vane's brother Billy, Jim Burke and George Chesher – each of them identified by an accomplice, John McKellar, who agreed to testify against the others. A warrant was also issued for John Vane's arrest as he had been identified by Joseph Sargeant as being involved in the robbery. William Vane, James Burke and George Chesher were indicted for the robbery at Boyce's public-house and tried in the Bathurst Quarter Sessions on 24 September 1863. The evidence against the three was dependent on McKellar's testimony, but as a result of a lack of supporting evidence and the other witnesses being unable to identify the prisoners, they were all acquitted.

=== John Gilbert's gang ===
Vane spent the next several months "dodging about keeping out of the way of the police", which included a period in the Abercrombie Mountains camped at Pound Creek, where his friends kept him "supplied with provisions and information". In late July 1863 Vane visited the Cowra district where he stole six horses. On his return to Number One with the horses he received a message, conveyed by a boy and sent from the bushranger, John O'Meally, asking if Vane could meet with him and John Gilbert at Milpost Creek (about ten miles from Number One). Vane had previously met O'Meally on a number of occasions when he was droving cattle near the Weddin Mountains. When he met with O'Meally and Gilbert at Milpost Creek, during the course of the conversation they asked Vane to join them, to which he agreed.

Several days later O'Meally questioned Vane about the location of the bank at Carcoar. O'Meally, who was unfamiliar with the township, was mainly concerned with being able to reach the bank without passing by the police station. In the middle of the day on Thursday, 30 July 1863, Gilbert and O'Meally were thwarted in their attempt to rob the Commercial Bank at Carcoar, the pair abandoning the attempt when the alarm was raised before they could carry out the robbery. Vane was not involved in the actual attempt, as he was considered to be too well-known in the township.

On Friday, 31 July 1863, Gilbert, O'Meally and Vane arrived at the store belonging to "Alick the Greek" on Mountain Run Creek near the Abercrombie River, two miles from Trunkey Creek. Vane remained a short distance away while Gilbert and O'Meally demanded money from the storekeeper and his wife. The Greek storekeeper managed to escape, leaving his wife to deal with the bushrangers; after a search of the premises only fifteen shillings was found. From there the gang rode towards Trunkey Creek where they stuck up Stapleton's public-house, including a crowd of miners assembled at the premises. They also robbed stores belonging to Robert Jamison and Mr. Dominique. It was recorded that the robberies were carried out with "considerable violence".

After these events the gang camped in the Carcoar district “and kept quiet for a time”, during which they made contact with Michael Burke, a friend of Vane's since childhood. Gilbert and O'Meally made it known they "would give a couple of pounds for two good horses in good condition" and Mick Burke offered to steal horses from the stables at Thomas Icely's 'Coombing Park' estate near Carcoar. Being aware that the groom at 'Coombing Park' kept a gun in the harness-room, Burke told them "he ought to have a revolver when he went to the place", to which O'Meally responded by handing him a gun. On the evening of 2 August 1863 Burke and "another lad" visited Icely's stables. As Burke was leading out two horses he was seen by the groom (known as "Charley the German"), who fired at him; Burke fired his revolver in return, hitting the groom in the mouth. When he delivered the horses the next day Burke, having “shot a man”, asked to join the gang.

It was decided to split the gang and focus on the mail coaches on separate roads, with Vane and Burke to go to the Cowra district while Gilbert and O'Meally remained in camp to attend to the Carcoar to Bathurst road. On their way Vane and Burke stuck up some Chinese miners on the Abercrombie River, obtaining a small amount of gold dust. They camped near the road between Carcoar and Cowra to await the mail coach. Vane left to attend to some personal business and was delayed in returning, to find Burke had stopped the coach himself, but managed to get only £3 from the passengers. After a week they rejoined their companions in the Carcoar district. During their absence, on 6 August 1863, Gilbert and O'Meally had attempted to bail up the Carcoar to Bathurst coach, but were surprised to find it contained a police escort conveying prisoners to Bathurst. In the ensuing gunfight one of the policemen was wounded.

Police activity increased after the attack on the coach near Carcoar, with every road “being watched closely by the police”. It was decided for this reason to re-locate to the Young district to join up with Gilbert and O'Meally's comrade, Ben Hall.

=== Young district ===
On 13 August 1863 "a band consisting of four finely mounted robbers, headed by Gilbert" was seen in the neighbourhood of Marengo, 15 miles east of Young. Gilbert, O'Meally, Vane and Burke joined with Ben Hall at his campsite on 'Mimmegong' station (now known as 'Memagong'), west of Young. In his biography Vane states that, from when the bushrangers met up, Hall "became our leader".

On 16 August 1863 a police patrol which had been hunting for the bushrangers, led by Inspector Frederick Pottinger and consisting of three troopers and two Aboriginal trackers, came across the tracks of five horses south of the Weddin Mountains. They followed the tracks until dark. The next morning, after “incessant rain” during the night, they came upon the riders. The bushrangers, seeing the police, galloped off and escaped on their “superior horses”. Pottinger and his men had come within three hundred yards of the gang and were able to identify Gilbert, O'Meally, Hall, Vane and Burke. Pottinger's trackers followed the bushrangers' trail to their camp on 'Mimmegong' station. The bushrangers had formed two separate camps on 'Mimmegong' about a mile distant from each other, one for the day another for the night, and the trackers had found the night-camp where some of the bushrangers' horses were tethered. Hall and Vane, on returning to the day-camp, had seen the fresh tracks of shod horses heading in the direction of the night-camp and concluded “that the police were about”. Wishing to retrieve some of their horses, however, the gang cautiously approached the night-camp and, while the others waited in hiding, Vane rode up and began to put a bridle on one of the horses. From his concealed position Pottinger called out “Stand!”, upon which the bushrangers began firing, with the police returning fire. Vane ran back to his horse and was in the process of mounting it when he was shot in the calf. Despite his wound Vane mounted the horse and escaped. O'Meally, who had approached from the opposite side, had managed to secure a horse and the five bushrangers then galloped through the scrub and onto a flat, when they turned and kept their pursuers at bay with their rifles, having a longer range than the police revolvers. On the night of 18 August 1863, the bushrangers called at Roberts' 'Currawang' station in the Black Range, south of Marengo, and stole "four or five" of the best horses from the stables. Roberts had been engaged by the police to muster, select and break in horses "for the express purpose of bushranger-hunting". After the confrontation with Pottinger and his party the bushrangers camped in the dense scrub near Bald Hill, north-west of Young, while Vane recovered from his wound.

During the morning of 24 August 1863 Gilbert, O'Meally, Hall, Vane and Burke stuck up and robbed several people on the Hurricane Gully Road between Young and the Twelve-mile Rush. Amongst those who were robbed were four storekeepers travelling to the diggings to collect accounts. The storekeepers were not carrying money, but the bushrangers took their horses, saddles and bridles. After camping in the Black Range for several days the gang separated. Gilbert, Hall and Burke headed to Burrowa while O'Meally and Vane remained at James O'Meally’s place in the Black Range, with the arrangement they would meet up again at 'Demondrille' station near Murrumburrah.

On Saturday evening, 29 August 1863, O'Meally and Vane stuck up 'Demondrille' station, stealing a revolver, a saddle and bridle, four bottles of "pale brandy" and other articles from the superintendent of the station, John Edmonds. After the robbery O'Meally and Vane stopped at a slab hut two and a half miles from 'Demondrille' homestead, occupied by Walter Tootal, his mother and two younger siblings, as well as a carrier named George Slater. Vane described the visit as "a friendly one, and the brandy was brought into requisition". In the meantime, after information of the armed robbery was received at Murrumburrah, Senior-constable Haughey and Constable Keane joined with two policemen from Wombat and rode towards the station. In the early hours of Sunday morning the four troopers, having arrived at 'Demondrille' and acting on information received from Edmonds, went to Tootal's hut and saw four horses tied up outside (three of them saddled). Mounted-constable Churchman approached the hut and called on those inside to come out; the door was opened momentarily and then closed again. Suddenly shots were fired from the hut, wounding the policemen's horses and hitting Haughey in the knee. O'Meally and Vane emerged from the hut, exchanging fire with the police in the darkness. O'Meally reached their horses but one broke away in the confusion, leaving Vane to escape into the surrounding bush on foot.

After his escape from Tootal's hut, O'Meally rejoined Gilbert, Hall and Burke who were camped a short distance away. A horse was then brought for Vane, but, as the gang was a horse short, later that morning Gilbert and O'Meally rode off in search of one. It was during that foray that O'Meally murdered John Barnes, a storekeeper from Murrumburrah, as Barnes and another man were riding along the road to Cootamundry in the vicinity of 'Wallendbeen' station. After this incident the gang returned to the Young district, camping on 'Mimmegong' station to the west of the township. Gilbert, Hall and Burke remained only a few days, leaving O'Meally and Vane at 'Mimmegong'.

On Friday, 4 September 1863, O'Meally and Vane stuck-up McGregor's store on Humbug Creek in The Bland district. During the robbery William Campbell, a magistrate of Burrowa, rode up and was greeted by Vane (mis-identified in the newspaper report as Gilbert). The bushrangers took a quantity of clothing and other property from the store and Campbell's gold watch and chain.

On the evening of 10 September 1863 O'Meally and Vane entered Eastlake's store at the Twelve-mile Rush at Burrangong (west of Young). O'Meally presented his revolver at the storekeeper who immediately dropped behind the counter and called out for assistance. In response O'Meally fired his revolver, the bullet hitting the shelves and the flash extinguished the candle. Vane went to a backroom where another man was in the act of taking down a revolver from the mantelpiece. Disarming the man Vane returned to the store. Meanwhile, in the darkened room, the storekeeper had crawled to the end of the counter and gained access to a gun. He fired at Vane, with the bullet passing between Vane's arm and his body. O'Meally and Vane hurriedly left the store, mounted their horses and headed towards the nearby Ten-mile Rush. At the outskirts of the settlement they entered Neasmith's store and held up Mrs. Neasmith, during which the robbers were described as being "quite cool and jocular". After gathering a number of articles from the store, a customer entered from whom they took a bag which contained (according to Vane's biography) £60 in notes and seven ounces of gold. Soon afterwards the bushrangers departed, returning to their "camp in the scrub". After about a week at the camp O'Meally and Vane loaded up two pack-horses with stolen store goods ("chiefly drapery"), intended as gifts for their friends and sympathisers, and travelled back to the Carcoar district.

=== Carcoar district ===
On Tuesday, 22 September 1863, word reached Gilbert's gang, from one of their 'telegraphs', that three troopers were on patrol on the road towards Carcoar in the vicinity of Mount Macquarie. Gilbert, O'Meally, Vane and Burke set off in pursuit; following their tracks they observed the troopers had called at the hut of a man called Marsh. As they approached the hut the three policemen and Marsh emerged, but were taken by surprise by the four bushrangers, disarmed and tied to a fence. They were released after several hours, the bushrangers having taken the troopers' horses, saddles and bridles, as well as their firearms and handcuffs.

Late on Wednesday afternoon, 23 September 1863, Stanley Hosie's store at Caloola was stuck up by Gilbert, O'Meally, Vane and Mick Burke. They secured Hosie with handcuffs taken from the three troopers they robbed the day before, and then rounded up the blacksmith and another man living opposite and the village shoemaker, handcuffing all three. The bushrangers then proceeded to ransack the store, pulling things from the shelves and causing much damage. They told Hosie “they did this as a punishment for his having given information to the police of their former visit to them”. In the paddock adjoining the store the bushrangers managed to catch two horses, and "being unable to catch the others, deliberately shot them". They loaded the horses with the goods they wished to keep and left. The bushrangers then "adjourned to an inn close by, and there caroused until a late hour".

On Friday evening, 25 September 1863, John Loudon's household at 'Grubbenbong' station, fifteen miles from Carcoar, was robbed by the gang of bushrangers, Gilbert, Hall, O'Meally, Vane and Burke. The bushrangers arrived at about ten o'clock and forced their way into the house at gunpoint. The members of the household were taken to the verandah where Loudon and some of the men at the station were handcuffed and Loudon's wife and "the other females" were given chairs to sit on. After ransacking the house the bushrangers "ordered supper", and had ham and eggs cooked for them. Later "Vane amused the party by playing the piano". The bushrangers remained at the station for about four hours before departing in the early hours of the morning.

Late on Saturday morning, 26 September 1863, the bushrangers arrived at William Rothery's 'Cliefden' station at Limestone Creek, south-west of Carcoar, where they bailed up the occupants and "partook of dinner – regaling themselves with champagne and brandy". Hall and Gilbert rode down the paddock and ran the station horses up to the yard where three were selected and saddles and bridles procured. From Rothery's the bushrangers proceeded to Canowindra (after having informed Rothery of their intended destination), arriving at the township at six o'clock in the afternoon. They firstly detained Constable Sykes, the only policeman stationed at Canowindra, and took him to Robinson's public-house. O'Meally and Burke remained at the inn while Hall, Gilbert and Vane “went on a foraging expedition” to the two stores in the township, belonging to Pierce and Hilliar, taking a quantity of men's clothing and three pounds in cash. They then adjourned to Robinson's house and ordered tea. The publican and his wife had departed for Bathurst, leaving Robinson's sister and "the two Miss Flanagan’s in charge of the house". After they had eaten "Gilbert very politely requested one of the young ladies to play him a tune on the piano". Later in the evening a dance was proposed, which "continued till daylight the next morning". A number of the town's residents had also been brought to the public-house and it was reported that "the night’s amusement" was "spoken of as one of the jolliest affairs that has ever taken place in that small town". In the morning Hall, Vane and Burke rode to 'Bangaroo' station in search of horses, but finding none, returned to Canowindra where Gilbert informed them that troopers were camped on the opposite side of the Belubula River, now in full flood, waiting for the waters to subside. With the exception of Burke, the bushrangers crossed the flooded stream and camped on a hill overlooking the town. Burke crossed the next morning after the waters had dropped, after which the gang rode into “very rough country” to evade the police.

=== Bathurst and surrounds ===
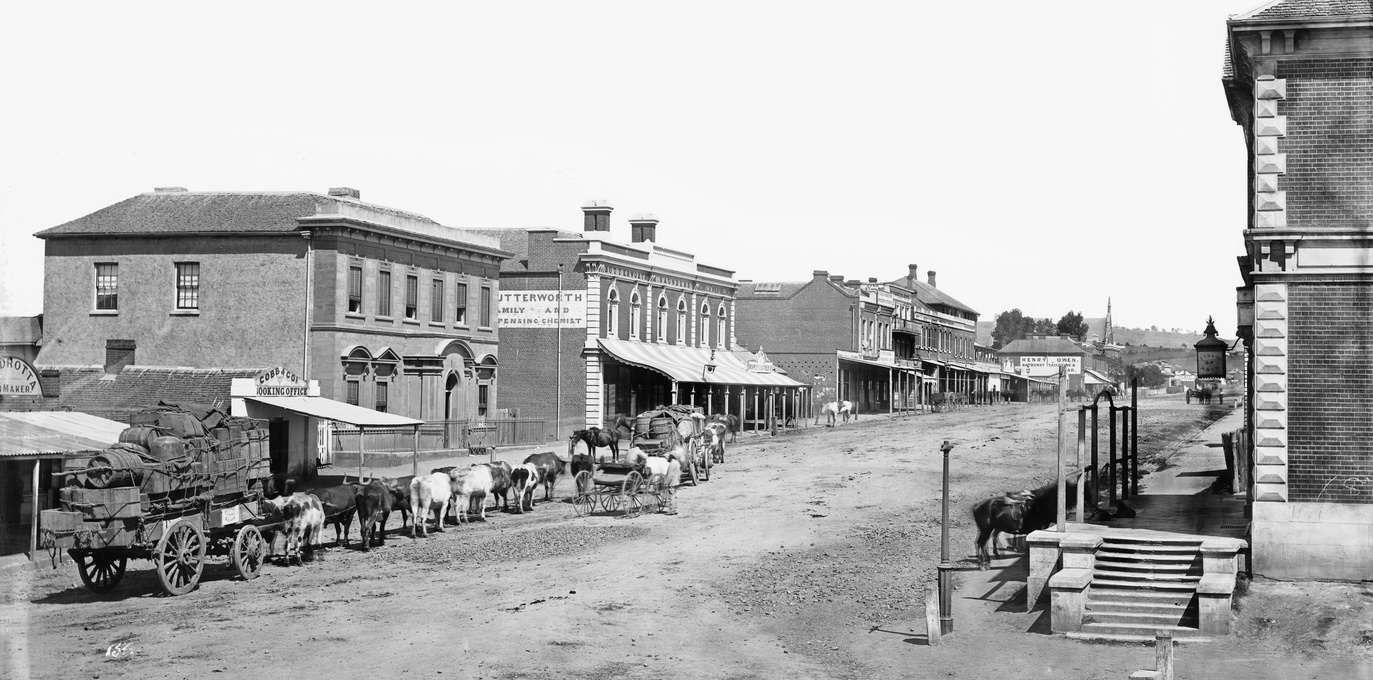
William-street in Bathurst, photographed in the early 1870s.

Early on Saturday evening, 3 October 1863, Gilbert's gang of bushrangers rode into Bathurst, the most populous township west of the Blue Mountains and headquarters of the Western police force. Saturday night was the 'market night' for the town, where the shops around the town square were open for business. Vane kept watch in the darkness near the Telegraph Office while the others went shopping in William-street. They stopped at the shop of Pedrotta, the gunsmith, hoping to obtain revolving rifles, but were informed none were presently available. Proceeding a few doors down Hall and Gilbert entered McMinn's jeweller's shop with guns drawn, while O'Meally and Burke waited in the street outside. In the shop McMinn's daughter started to scream and several of those in the street became aware of the situation and raised the alarm. Realising the situation had gotten out of hand, Hall and Gilbert "beat a retreat". Having left the shop and remounted their horses, they galloped back along William-street. At the Howick-street corner, Hall and another of the riders turned and the others, appearing to have become uncertain of their way, continued in a direction leading to the police barracks. Hall fired his revolver in the air, causing his companions to turn. By this time Vane had also joined them and the bushrangers crossed over into George-street. As they passed the corner with Piper-street they saw John de Clouet's public-house, the Sportsman's Arms. De Clouet owned a racehorse named 'Pasha' which Gilbert coveted, so he, Vane and O'Meally dismounted and entered the rear of the yard. Finding the stable locked they went to the house and bailed up De Clouet and his wife, taking from them £10 and two watches. By this time police had been seen galloping along George-street, so they remounted and started making their way out of the town. The bushrangers were spotted by troopers and fired upon, but managed to escape.

On the evening of 6 October 1863 Gilbert's gang raided several places along the Vale Road, leading south from Bathurst. To start with they paid a visit to a store kept by the widow, Mary Mutton, only half a mile from the township, where they demanded money but were assured there was none. While searching the bedroom with a candle for light, Gilbert set fire to the bed-curtains (he claimed by accident). O'Meally and Vane rushed in and Vane put out the flames, but burnt his hands in the process. He later recalled that "the old lady was very kind when she saw what had happened, and got me some Holloway's ointment to dress the burns, at the same time remonstrating with us for pursuing such evil courses". The Mutton family story is consistent with Vane's recollection except for one significant detail: that it was Gilbert, not Vane, who extinguished the flames and burnt his hands. The next place the bushrangers called at was Walker's public-house, a mile further on, where they obtained only a few notes and some silver coins, as well as an old horse-pistol. The next place was McDiarmid's store, where they bundled groceries and other goods into pillow-cases. A mile down the road was the Hen and Chickens Hotel, kept by Henry Butler, where once again there were meagre rewards.

=== The affray at 'Dunn's Plains' ===
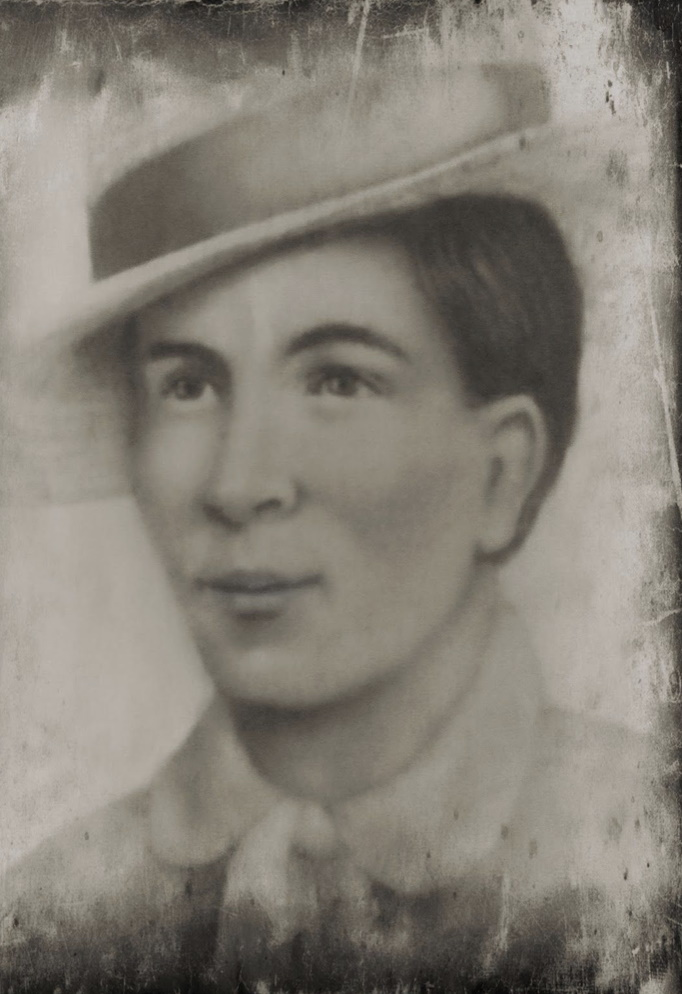
Micky Burke, bushranger, died in October 1863 at 'Dunn's Plains', aged 20 years.

On the evening of Saturday, 24 October 1863, the bushrangers John Gilbert, John O'Meally, Ben Hall, Johnny Vane and Mick Burke approached the homestead of Henry Keightley, at 'Dunn's Plains' near Rockley. Keightley, an assistant Gold Commissioner, was about thirty yards from the house when the gang rode up and ordered him to “bail up”. Rather than obey the order Keightley ran towards the house, as the bushrangers fired at him. When he was inside the house, he and a guest, Dr. W. C. Pechey, guarded the door with a double-barrelled gun, of which only one barrel was loaded, and a revolver. The bushrangers fired at the men from cover. Burke crept up the side of the house and, swinging his arm around, fired at the defenders as they stood at the doorway. Keightley waited for Burke to show himself; when he next appeared, "incautiously exposing his body", he was shot in the abdomen, causing him to stagger to the side of the house. Burke was heard to say, "I'm done for, but I’ll not be taken alive", and tried to shoot himself with his revolver. The first shot grazed his forehead and the next "blew away a portion of his skull", whereupon he fell to the ground. The other bushrangers continued to fire from cover. At one stage Dr. Pechey attempted to cross the yard to a kitchen where another gun could be found, but he encountered Vane, who ordered him back and fired after him. The two defenders then climbed to the roof through a skylight and Keightley exchanged shots with Vane in the yard below. Ben Hall called out that they would burn the house if they did not come down. With Keightley's wife and child sheltering in the house, the two men relented and agreed to surrender. After they descended, an infuriated Vane struck Dr. Pechey with the butt of his revolver, knocking him to the ground.

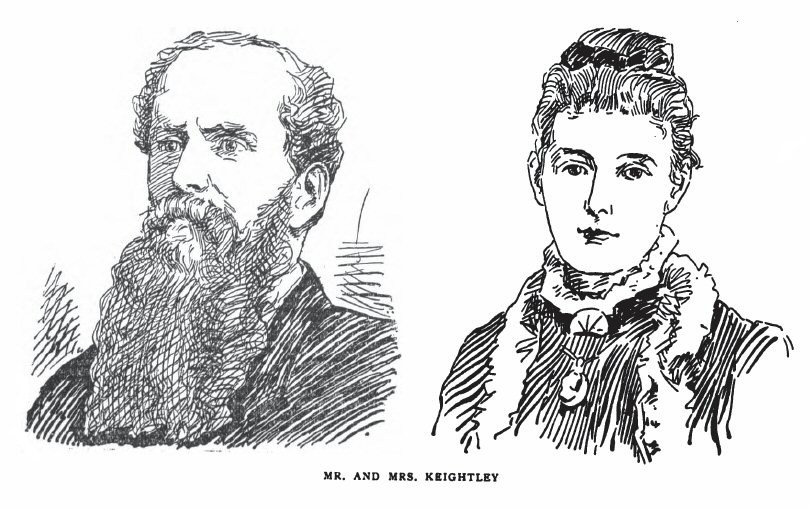
Henry and Caroline Keightley of 'Dunn’s Plains', near Rockley; illustration from White's History of Australian Bushranging, Vol. II (1903).

Keightley was now in a precarious position. With his friend lying gravely wounded, Johnny Vane grabbed Keightley's gun and loaded it. In anger Vane told them that "Burke and he had been brought up as boys together, that they had been mates ever since, and that the gun that had deprived him of life should in turn take the life of the man who killed him". Caroline Keightley, "in frantic agitation", implored Hall and Gilmore to save her husband's life, at which Hall called on Vane to desist. Gilbert and Hall then decided that "as the Government had placed five hundred pounds upon Burke’s head, the amount of the reward should be handed over to them". They agreed to allow until two o'clock the following day "for the production of the money". Dr. Pechey examined Burke, who was still breathing but unconscious, and said there was little he could do without his instruments. The doctor was permitted to go into Rockley to get what he needed, "having first pledged his honour that he would not raise the alarm". O'Meally had been tending to the horses during these negotiations. When he returned, O'Meally rejected the ransom proposal "and declared his intention to revenge the death of his companion", but eventually he was "pacified by the others". While they awaited Pechey’s return the bushrangers went into the house and "drank some spirits and wine". By the time Dr. Pechey returned from Rockley, Burke had died.

Arrangements were then made for payment of the ransom. Caroline Keightley and Dr. Pechey were to go into Bathurst for the money. If there were any indication of the police being notified the bushrangers vowed to shoot Keightley immediately. Their captive was taken to a nearby hill called Dog Rocks, which overlooked the road. Pechey and Mrs. Keightley rode the 29 miles (36 km) to Bathurst, arriving at about four in the morning. They went to Caroline’s father, Henry Rotton, who had the Commercial Bank opened for him so he could procure the required money. Rotton and Dr. Pechey then travelled back to 'Dunn’s Plains' where the doctor handed over the ransom and Keightley was set free.

While they had been waiting for the ransom the bushrangers arranged with men from a neighbouring station to take Burke's body on a spring cart to his father's house, for which they were paid £2 each. Two days later troopers from Cowra met the men conveying Burke's body, took charge of the cart and conveyed the body to Carcoar so an autopsy could be carried out.

=== Surrender and imprisonment ===
The events at Dunn's Plains and the death of his childhood friend caused Vane to reconsider the path he had chosen; in his words: "Now that blood had been spilt I felt that I had had enough of the game". When the bushrangers left Keightley's, Vane told O'Meally he wished to go to his father’s place, "promising to return to the camp on the following day". That was the last he saw of his companions; "I did not return to the camp and they did not come to look for me". Vane travelled to the hut "of some people who were friendly to me" where he stayed until he heard that Hall, Gilbert and O'Meally had left the district and gone towards Forbes. After that he began to move about alone, carrying his firearms only for protection, having (as he later claimed) "given up all idea of any further sticking-up".

As soon as the details of the attack on Keightly's place became known the New South Wales Government announced an increased reward of one thousand pounds each for information leading to the apprehension of the offenders Gilbert, Hall, O'Meally and Vane, "charged with the commission of numerous and serious offences". In addition, further rewards were offered of one hundred pounds for information leading to "the conviction of any person or persons for harbouring, assisting, or maintaining either of the abovenamed offenders". As notifications of the substantial rewards being offered were posted and circulated throughout the district, Vane's situation became increasingly precarious, necessitating extra caution on his part, unsure of who he could trust.

About three weeks after he had separated from Hall, Gilbert and O'Meally, Vane was camped in the bush, occupied making bullets in a bullet mould, when he heard a rider approaching. As he drew closer the rider called out, "Don't shoot Vane, I’m not a policeman". The visitor to Vane’s camp was a Roman Catholic priest, Father Tim McCarthy. His first question to the bushranger was, "Where are your companions?", to which Vane replied that he had left them and he believed they had departed from the district. McCarthy had spoken to Vane’s mother the day before, who had begged the priest to try to find her son and persuade him to give himself up. McCarthy promised Vane he would not be hanged if he came to Bathurst and surrendered. Vane had very few options. As expressed in his biography: "I had no desire to die by a bullet, as my poor mate, Mickey Burke, had done, and still less did I like the prospect of being captured and ending my life on the gallows". He had a vague hope of "escaping to a place where I was not known", but, as he admitted, "I was afraid to make away alone for strange parts". Weighing up these considerations, Vane told the priest he would "chance it".

Vane was instructed to come that night to the priest’s residence at 'Mallow Grove', two miles east of Carcoar, after which they would "ride quietly into Bathurst" together. That evening Vane made his way to 'Mallow Grove', arriving at nine o'clock, where McCarthy told him they must first go to Carcoar to speak with the magistrate, Nathaniel Connolly. At Carcoar, after Father McCarthy informed Connolly of the situation by Father McCarthy and Vane "formally surrendered himself", the magistrate wrote out a statement and gave it to Vane, "saying that it would protect me on the road should we meet the police". McCarthy and Vane then returned to 'Mallow Grove', before setting out for Bathurst at midnight. They kept to a bush track until they reached Blayney, and then followed the main road to Bathurst, arriving there at five in the morning of Thursday, 19 November 1863. They pulled up at Mrs. Mary Walsh's Fitzroy Inn in George-street, stabled the horses and had breakfast. After breakfast Mrs. Walsh took a message to the Superintendent of Police, Edric Morrisset, who arrived at the inn shortly afterwards. After handing over the paper written out by Connolly, Vane and McCarthy then walked down to the Court House where the Police Magistrate, Dr. Palmer, formally remanded Vane in custody.

=== Trial and sentencing ===
John Vane was tried on Tuesday, 12 April 1864, at the Bathurst Circuit Court before Sir Alfred Stephen, the Chief Justice of New South Wales. Vane was arraigned on five separate charges; two for "shooting with intent", to which the prisoner pleaded not guilty, and the other three charges were for "robbery under arms", to which he pleaded not guilty. The armed robbery charges related to the robbery of Hosie's store at Caloola on 23 September 1863, the sticking-up of and stealing from Loudon's household at 'Grubbenbong' two days later, and the armed robbery of Pierce’s store at Canowindra on the following day. One of the "shooting with intent" charges related to the August 1863 attempt near Carcoar to free prisoners who were being transported by coach under police guard. Vane was defended by the barrister, William Dalley. The testimonies of witnesses to this incident were heard, but in his address to the jury Dalley pointed to inconsistencies in the evidence regarding the identity of the prisoner and maintained that Vane's participation had been at a distance from the action. The jury retired to consider their verdict on this charge and during their absence Justice Stephen addressed the courtroom, saying "he believed there were some near relatives of the prisoner in the Court, and as no doubt they were in a state of painful anxiety as to the issue of the case, he did not think he would be stepping beyond the line of his duty in stating, for the relief of their minds, that whatever might be their verdict, it was not his intention to pass sentence of death upon the prisoner". When the jury returned after twenty minutes they returned a verdict of not guilty. At this stage Dalley then intimated to the Court that he had advised his client to withdraw his plea of not guilty to the second "shooting with intent" charge (that of shooting at Henry Keightley in October 1863), "and to plead guilty thereto". Vane was thereupon re-arraigned on that charge, and this time he pleaded guilty. The sentencing of the prisoner was deferred.

John Vane was sentenced on 14 April 1864. Before the judgement was pronounced Vane’s barrister made a statement to the Court regarding the prisoner’s "extreme youth" and claimed that before Vane "was led to abandon himself to his late lawless pursuits he had borne a good character". Depositions in favour of the prisoner were made by Dr. Richard MacHattie of Bathurst and Solomon Meyer, a Justice of the Peace at Carcoar. Justice Stephen then addressed the prisoner, detailing the charges upon which the sentence was to be passed. At the conclusion of his address the judge pronounced a sentence of fifteen years "for the outrage at Mr. Keightley’s", and for each of the other offences "ten years hard labour on the roads or other public works of the colony" to be served concurrently, "making the whole term of imprisonment fifteen years".

=== Release ===
In February 1870 Johnny Vane's sentence was remitted and he was released from Darlinghurst Gaol. Vane obtained board and lodging in York Street, Sydney, and found employment working as a stonemason on the St. Mary's Cathedral building. He remained there for only a short time, before leaving Sydney for the more familiar Western districts. He tried mining for gold, with "only moderate success". Later he undertook work as a carpenter, as a shearer, "or anything else that came to hand, to earn an honest living".

In December 1872 a daughter was born to John Vane and Jane Parker. The couple were married on 20 February 1873 at Carcoar. Eleven further children were born between 1874 and 1899.

In May 1875 John Vane was convicted of stealing at the Carcoar Bench of Magistrates and sentenced to three months' imprisonment.

=== Sheep-stealing ===
In late April 1880 John Vane was charged with stealing 481 sheep from T. A. Smith, Police Magistrate of Trunkey Creek. At the Bathurst Quarter Sessions on 6 July 1880 Vane ("of bushranging notoriety") was indicted for the sheep-stealing offence. A man named Hargans, who was serving a sentence of two years in Parramatta Gaol for stealing the sheep in question, was the principal witness. Another witness, Terence McCann, under committal for horse-stealing, who had been an accomplice of Vane and Hargans, had previously given information to the police, leading to Vane's arrest. Vane was convicted and remanded for sentencing. The article concluded: "The sheep owners of Trunkey district have for a considerable period suffered through the depredations of a gang of thieves, who have up to the present, carried on their operations with impunity". Vane was sentenced to five years hard labour on the roads. He was transferred to Berrima gaol on 29 July 1880.

Subsequent to Vane's conviction a man named Thomas Parker was convicted at the Bathurst Quarter Sessions for attempting to dissuade Terence McCann from giving evidence in the sheep-stealing case against John Vane. Parker was sentenced to twelve months' imprisonment with hard labour. Thomas Parker was John Vane's brother-in-law. Jane Parker was John Vane's wife.

=== Last years ===
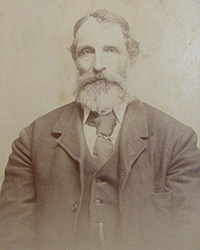
John Vane, photographed in about 1898.

Vane was released from prison in August 1884. When he was discharged his occupation was recorded as "smith". By 1888 John Vane and his family were living at Cowra. By the time of his death in 1906 Vane was described as "an old resident of Woodstock" (13 miles north-east of Cowra).

In his later years Vane was described as "at all times an unobtrusive man, preferring to keep as much as possible in the background". It was said to be impossible to "draw him out in respect to his bushranging exploits, his reticence on that score being very pronounced". Towards the end of his life Vane suffered from deafness, "which caused him to be more retiring than formerly".

In about September 1905 Vane "entered into an engagement with the proprietor of a circus, which was travelling up the North Coast, to show himself in the ring nightly as the sole surviving representative of the Gardiner-Hall gang". He pulled out of this arrangement after only a short period; when he returned to Woodstock, Vane "religiously abstained from making the slightest reference to his circus career".

In late 1905 John Vane visited the author and newspaper editor, Charles White, in Sydney. Vane gave White "an account of the inner life of the gang with which he had been associated".

John Vane died on 30 January 1906 in Cowra hospital, aged 63 years, and was buried in an unmarked grave the following day at Woodstock cemetery. The cause of his death was recorded as ileo-colitis (Crohn's disease).

John Vane's biography, edited by Charles White, was published in 1908 by Alfred C. Rowlandson of the New South Wales Bookstall Co. In late October 1908 the book began to be serialised in The Arrow newspaper, published in Sydney.

In 1989 a memorial plaque was erected at Vane’s reputed grave-site by local historians.
