= Woodstock, New South Wales =

Woodstock New South Wales
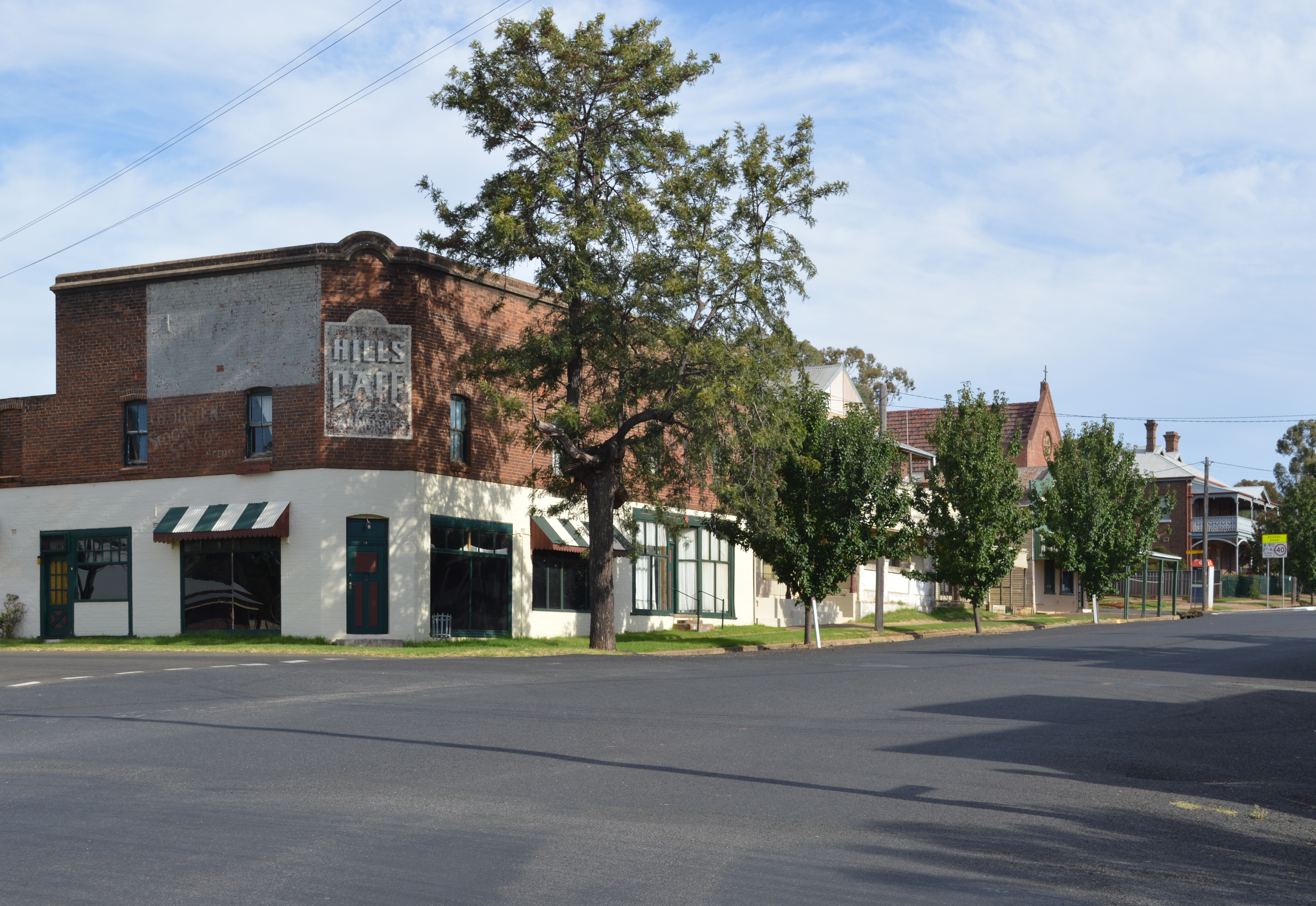
- Parkes Street, the main street of Woodstock

- Coordinates: 33°44′45″S 148°50′50″E
- Population: 327 (UCL 2021)
- Established: 1888
- Postcode(s): 2793
- Location: 300 km (186 mi) from Sydney; 30 km (19 mi) from Wyangala; 21 km (13 mi) from Cowra
- LGA(s): Cowra Shire
- State electorate(s): Cootamundra
- Federal division(s): Riverina

Woodstock is a village in the central west of New South Wales, Australia, 21 kilometres (13 mi) north east of Cowra. It contains remains of a brief goldrush during the late 19th century which left behind a number of substantial buildings before the village relapsed into relative isolation. It includes a restored railway station, hotel and a memorial hall. Country markets are held at Woodstock Soldiers Memorial Hall on the second Sunday of each month except January. The Memorial Hall hosts a touring opera company, OperaWorks, each year. Other events at Woodstock include a long track motorbike championships and the annual show.

== History ==
Gold was discovered in 1868 at Woods Flat, a few kilometres south of Woodstock. A rush of 500 diggers took up the ground there, but after a short period only a few were left as surface gold was minimal and water supplies lacking. The goldfield had a long history but today almost nothing remains of the buildings at Woods Flat. The village of Woodstock was established in response to the building of the railway line north of Woods Flat, from Blayney to Cowra in 1880s. Initially known also as Woods Flat, the name of the village was changed to Woodstock in 1886.

The railway station was opened in 1888 on the Blayney - Demondrille line which connected the Main Western Line at Blayney and the Main Southern Line at Demondrille railway station. At one time there were several sidings near the station with grain silos, stock yards, loading bank, goods shed, hay stage, and loco platform.

By 1900 there were many commercial businesses in the villages including butchers, bakers, hotels, saddleries, smithies, bootmakers, mercers, tailors, motor vehicle garages and billiard rooms. A post office was operating by 1897. The current Royal Hotel was rebuilt in 1911, an earlier timber building having been destroyed by fire. The Commercial Banking Company of Sydney opened a branch at Woodstock in 1907, followed by the Commonwealth Savings Bank in 1913 and the Bank of New South Wales in 1929. The Soldiers Memorial Hall was opened in 1925 by Sir Neville Reginald Howse, who was at that time the Member for Calare.

The bushranger John Vane, a member of Ben Hall's gang, who died in 1906 was buried in an unmarked grave at Woodstock cemetery. A headstone was erected by local historians in 1989.

In the 1980s railway services were suspended between Cowra and Blayney. The section was re-opened by the Lachlan Valley Railway which runs heritage trains from Cowra to Blayney. The railway station is now an art gallery and private residence.

== Population ==
At the 2011 census, Woodstock had a population of 812, which had fallen to 701 in the 2016 census. The 2021 census showed the population had grown to 792.

== Heritage listings ==
Woodstock has a number of heritage-listed sites, including:

- Blayney-Harden railway: Woodstock railway station

== Motorcycle speedway ==
The Woodstock Park motorcycle speedway track is located northeast of the village (33°44′16″S 148°51′28″E) off Purcell Drive. The venue has hosted the New South Wales Individual Speedway Championship.

== Gallery ==
Woodstock Images

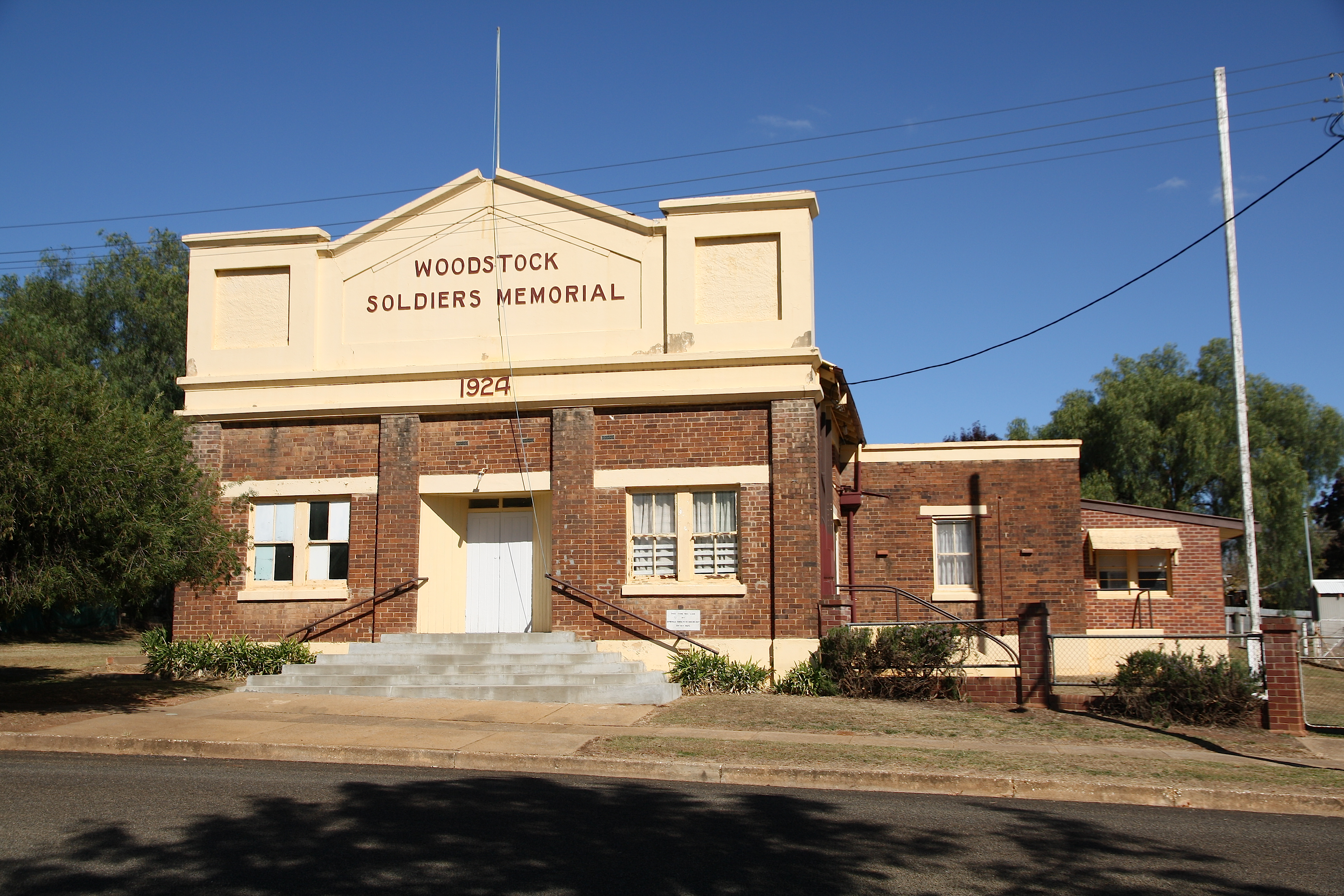
Woodstock Soldiers Memorial Hall,
Rankin Street

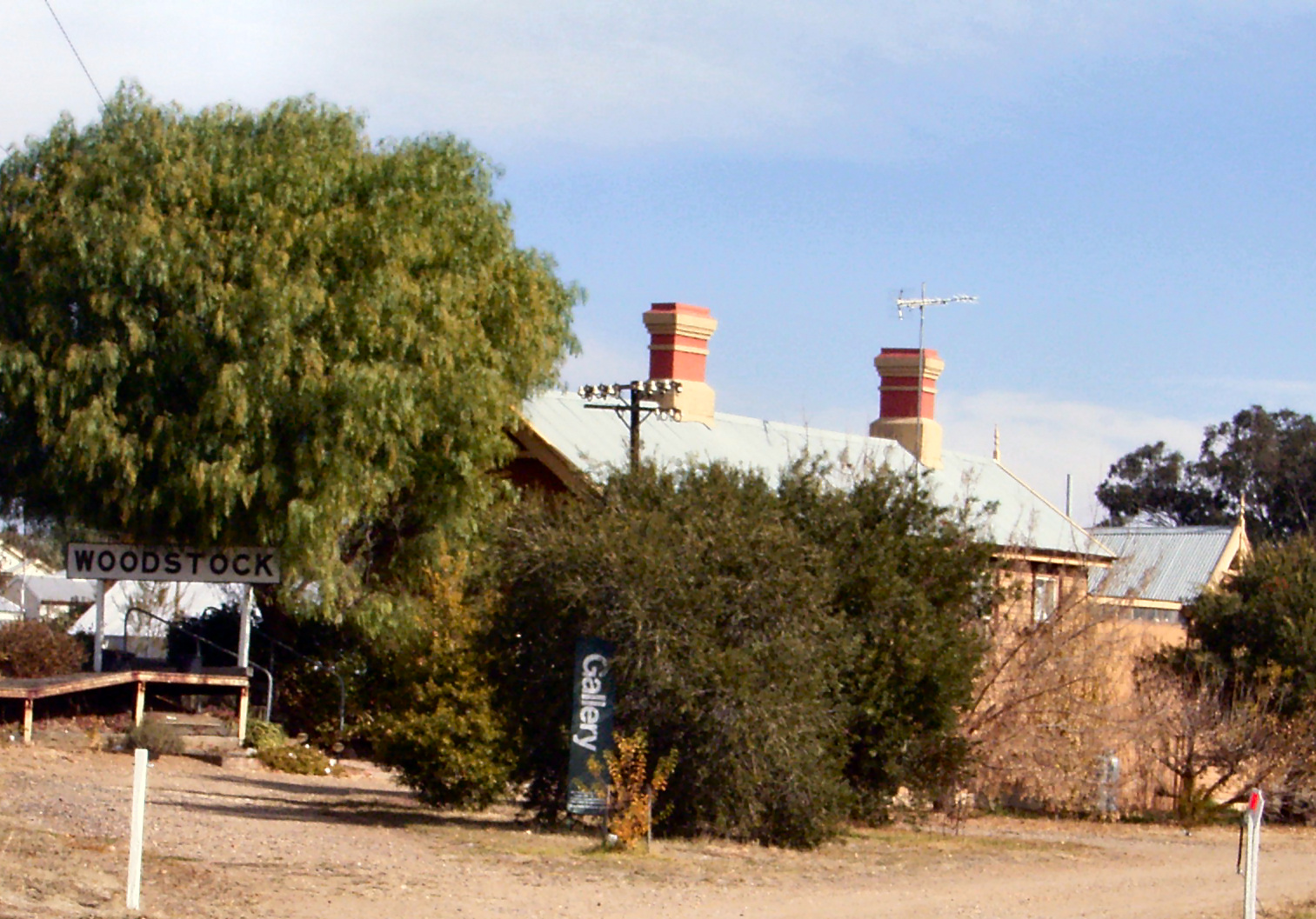
Woodstock railway station,
now an art gallery

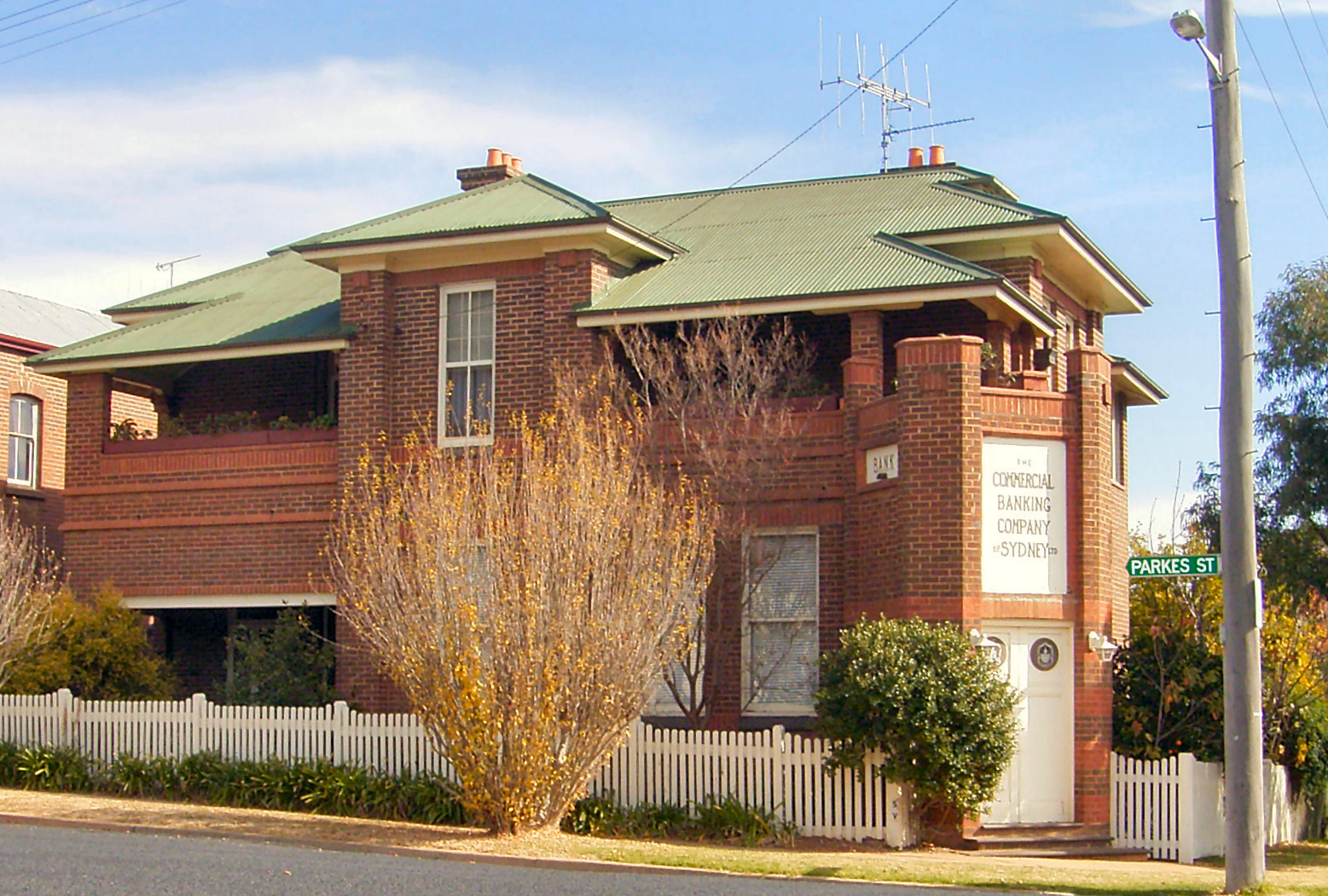
Former Commercial Banking Company branch
and residence
