= Caloola =

- Town
- Interactive map of Caloola
- Coordinates: 33°36′13.3″S 149°26′13.6″E
- Country: Australia
- State: New South Wales
- LGA: Bathurst Regional Council
- Location: 230 km (140 mi) W of Sydney; 28 km (17 mi) SW of Bathurst; 24 km (15 mi) ESE of Blayney

Government
  - State electorate: Bathurst
  - Federal division: Calare

Population
  - Total: 62 (2021 census)
- Postcode: 2795

Caloola is a locality in the Central West region of New South Wales. There once was a small village of the same name but it is a ghost town today. At the 2016 census, the locality had a population of 88, which fell to only 62 in 2021.

== Location ==
Caloola is 28 km south-west of Bathurst and 24 km east-south east of Blayney, by road. The nearest settlement is the village of Newbridge, 7 km to the west. The locality lies on either side of Trunkey Road, the road between Bathurst and Trunkey Creek.

== History ==
=== Aboriginal and early settler history ===
The area now known as Caloola is on the traditional land of Wiradjuri people. The name Caloola is probably a settlers' rendering of an aboriginal word and is said to mean "old battleground". After settler colonisation, Caloola lay within the County of Bathurst, Parish of Lowry.

In 1853, Caloola Creek was included as a goldfield within the Western Goldfields. There was a short-lived gold rush to Caloola Creek. By 1858, most of the ethnic-European gold diggers had moved on and the field had about 150 ethnic-Chinese miners working there.

Despite the presence of alluvial gold, the main impetus for further settlement, during the 1850s, seems to have been agriculture. Settlers in the area were petitioning for the establishment of a post office in 1856. The post office was opened in 1858 and operated from a newly built store.

In 1865, the Caloola Union Church was built. This church was unusual, in that the building was controlled by a local trust and made available to any denomination to hold church services.

=== Bushrangers ===
Gold in areas nearby, such as Tuena and Trunkey Creek, and improvements made to the roads to Bathurst and Tuena, generated passing traffic for Caloola, which in turn attracted bushrangers. In the early 1860s, the small settlement at Caloola—without any police—had more than its share of mayhem, largely but not only due to Ben Hall, John Gilbert and their criminal associates.

In late 1862, the owner of the store and inn at Caloola was shot during a robbery. Two of the robbers, Charles Ross and—unrelated—Alexander Ross, were convicted of attempted murder and hanged in 1863.

On 30 July 1863, the store was again robbed by two men, believed to be the bushrangers, John Gilbert and John O'Meally. The storekeeper rode to Bathurst to inform the police about the robbery.

On 23 September 1863, Caloola was the site of a raid by a gang of five notorious bushrangers, Ben Hall, John Gilbert, John O'Meally, John Vane, and Michael Burke. At the time, as well as the store, Caloola had a blacksmith and a shoemaker. The storekeeper and the two others were handcuffed. The gang ransacked the store, taking what they needed and willfully destroying the rest, as revenge for the storekeeper previously having given information to the police. The gang stole two horses from an adjacent paddock to carry their loot—shooting dead some other horses that they could not catch—before adjourning to Caloola's public house and carousing, until ten o'clock at night. One of the gang, John Vane, was later tried and convicted for his part in the raid, among other crimes. The other four members of the gang, who had raided Calooola, had all met violent deaths, by the end of May 1865.

=== Mining village ===
The impetus for the official establishment of a village was gold mining, after reef gold was found there in 1871. In 1897, there were three reef mines in the area. The most significant of these was the Caloola Creek Gold Mine. The Caloola Creek Gold Mining Co. had been registered in 1872. The mine continued in operation, until at least 1914, and probably somewhat later.

The site of a village, with the official name of Egan, was set aside on 27 January 1871. The site was between the left bank of Caloola Creek and the right bank of its tributary McGeorges Creek, on either side of the road now known as Trunkey Road, which was originally its main street. Within the village, the main street was called Lanarch Street. Other planned streets of Egan included Belmore, Corrie and Caloola Streets. The village had been planned in 1870. As a result of the Crown Lands Act of 1884, the village of Egan was proclaimed a village in 1885.

The manager of the Caloola Creek Gold Mine, in 1872, was Patrick Egan and it seems likely that the village took its official name from his surname. However, as the locality was already known as Caloola, or Caloola Creek, and it had an existing church and post office, the village was always better known as Caloola. The village seems to have grown, but not very much beyond the few buildings that were already on its site by 1871. Caloola had a post office, using that name, from 1858 to 1931.

A provisional school opened in 1871. An application was made for a public school at Caloola in August 1877. The public school opened in September 1877 and a board to control it was appointed in November of the same year. A teacher's residence existed at Caloola by 1880. The public school closed in 1891, reopening again as a provisional school in 1896. In 1904 residents were agitating for the opening of a public school. Tenders were called for the construction of a public school building in 1906. The school became a 'half time school' in 1909 and finally closed altogether, in 1917, after the mine had closed. In 1954, residents were once again advocating opening a school at Caloola, this time without success. The school was on the western side of Trunkey Road, at the southern end of the village.

In 1879, a contract was let for roadworks for a road connecting Caloola with Newbridge, which from 1882 lay on the Main Western railway line.

In 1902 and 1903, the size of the land allocated to the village was reduced and some streets closed, to more realistically reflect the future prospects of the village. By 1982, the village had been officially renamed Caloola and Trunkey Road had been realigned so that it ran slightly to the west of the old main street, Lanarch Street.

== Present day ==
The locality of Caloola is largely an agricultural area.

Little remains of the village of Caloola. Old roads roughly corresponding to Lanarch and Belmore Streets are still discernible. The Caloola Union Church, and its associated cemetery survive. These are still managed and maintained by a local trust. The church, the former schoolhouse, and teacher's residence were on a local heritage item list in 2014.

== External links section ==
- Map of the Parish of Lowry, with an inset diagram of the village of Egan (1942)
- Map of the Parish of Lowry, with an inset diagram of the village of Caloola (1982)
