= Woodstock railway station, New South Wales =

Woodstock railway station
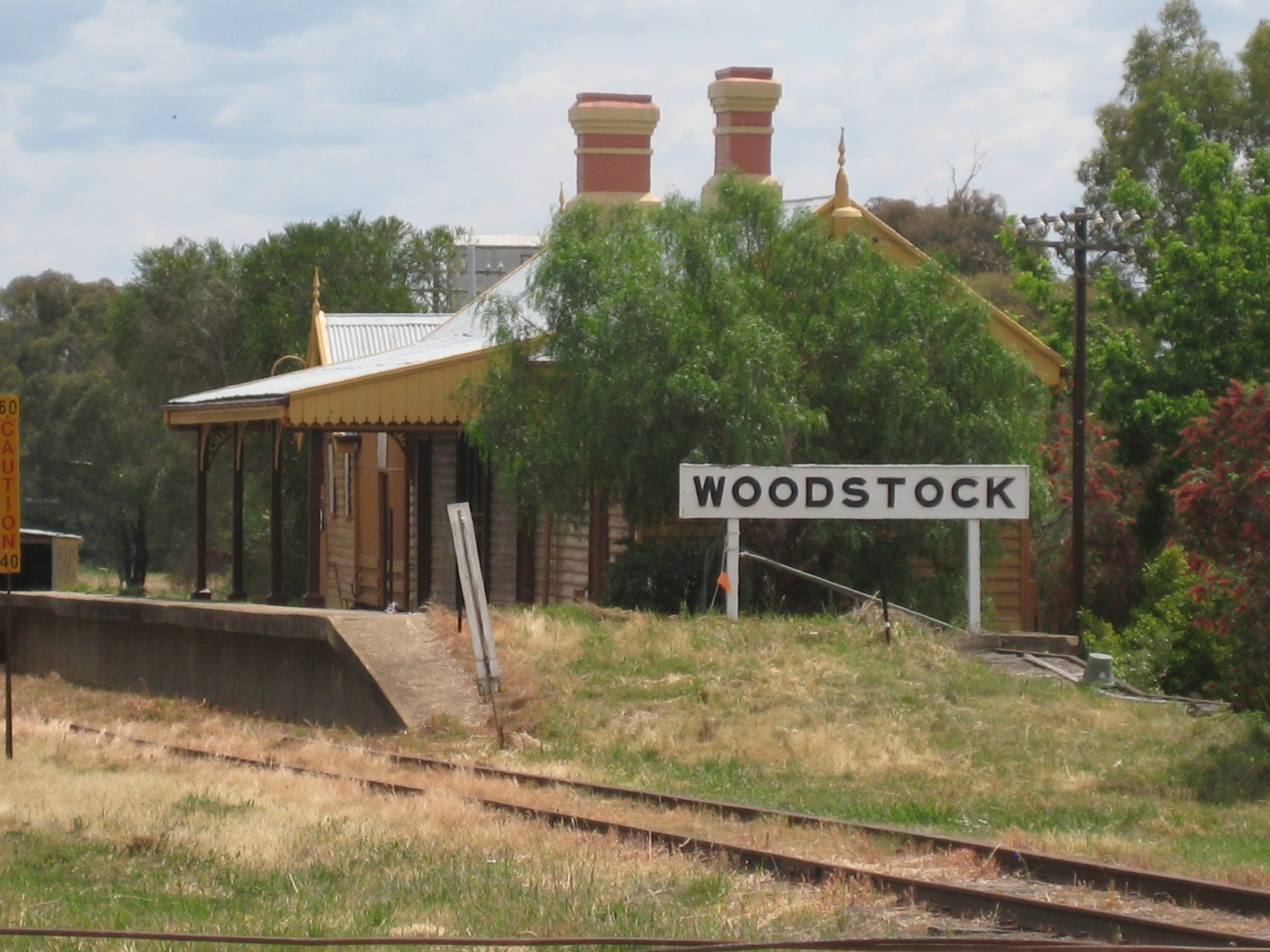
- Woodstock station in 2015

- Location within New South Wales Location within Australia
- 33.7432°S 148.8471°E
- Location: Blayney–Demondrille line, Woodstock, New South Wales, Australia

Site notes
- Owner: Transport Asset Manager of New South Wales

New South Wales Heritage Register
- Official name: Woodstock Railway Station
- Type: state heritage (built)
- Designated: 2 April 1999
- Reference no.: 1290
- Type: Railway Platform/Station
- Category: Transport – Rail

Woodstock railway station is a heritage-listed former railway station on the Blayney–Demondrille railway line at Woodstock, Cowra Shire, New South Wales, Australia. The property was added to the New South Wales State Heritage Register on 2 April 1999.

== History ==
The first cross-country railway line in NSW, connecting the southern and western lines, was proposed as early as 1875, with Surveyor Wade instructed to explore the country between Murrumburrah and Blayney to recommend a suitable route. Two similar routes were considered: one leaving the western line near the summit between Newbridge and Blayney, following the Evans Swamp Valley and the ridge near Waugoola Creek. The alternative was a line further west and in flatter country, between the Waugoola and Limestone creeks to the east of Cowra and continuing past Young before joining the southern line.

A later proposal (1879), this time by Surveyor Hogg, recommended that the branch line leave the western line 1.005 kilometres beyond Blayney station, passing through Carcoar and going directly through, rather than above, the town of Young. Construction of the cross-country line was approved by Parliament in April 1881 and a contract for the first stage of works to the first section of line from Murrumburrah to Young let to Messrs. O'Rourke and McSharry in September 1882. The work was to be completed by December 1884 but did not open until March 1885.

The rest of the cross-country line was constructed in two sections (Young to Cowra and Cowra to Blayney) with tenders called for both sections in February 1885 for completion by June 1887. The successful contractor for the Cowra to Blayney section was J. S. Robertson with the contract for the section from Young to Cowra let to Fishburn & Co. The first sod for the Blayney – Cowra section was turned in Blayney in March 1885 by the widow of Andrew Lynch, the former member for the electorate of Carcoar, who had been a strong advocate for construction of the line. The Young to Cowra section opened as a temporary terminus on November 1, 1886. The section between Cowra and Blayney (including Woodstock) was delayed due to late arrival of materials for the bridge over the Lachlan River at Cowra, but opened on 13 February 1888.

Rail services to Woodstock (and other stations on the line) were suspended in c. 1987.

== Description ==
Extant items at Woodstock include the type 4, timber, 3rd class station building (1888), brick and concrete platform face, station seat, and station signs. There are also some relics in the former goods yard.

The station building is a weatherboard structure which includes a gabled roof with galvanized corrugated sheeting, two brick chimneys, and bargeboards with finials at gable ends. There is an attached platform awning with metal roof, metal posts and decorative brackets. The platform side of the building is notable for a lack of fenestration, with five double hung sash windows provided on the road side of the building and few windows on the platform side. The internal arrangement of the building features six main rooms all accessed from the platform.

A jib crane with brick base, loading bank, and remains of a storage bin (possibly for coal) were reported to exist in the adjacent yard and former loco depot, though at the time of writing the station's entry on the State Heritage Register it was unclear as to whether they were located outside the heritage listing boundary.

== Heritage listing ==
The railway station at Woodstock is a good representative example of a type 4 (third class), late nineteenth century, timber station building that retains a good level of intactness. The railway station is an elegant, restrained weatherboard building which includes a notable veranda awning. It is an important element within the townscape of Woodstock, being located in a prominent position in the centre of the town. The station building, loading bank and jib crane demonstrate the former use of the place as a passenger station and goods yard dating back to the 1880s.

Woodstock railway station was listed on the New South Wales State Heritage Register on 2 April 1999 having satisfied the following criteria.

The place is important in demonstrating the course, or pattern, of cultural or natural history in New South Wales.

The station building, loading bank and jib crane at Woodstock date back to the arrival of the railway in Woodstock and surrounding districts in the 1880s, a period of rapid expansion of the government railway network throughout NSW.

The place is important in demonstrating aesthetic characteristics and/or a high degree of creative or technical achievement in New South Wales.

The railway station is an elegant, restrained weatherboard building which includes a notable veranda awning. It is an important element within the townscape of Woodstock, being located in a prominent position in the centre of the town.

The place is important in demonstrating the principal characteristics of a class of cultural or natural places/environments in New South Wales.

The passenger station at Woodstock is a good representative example of a type 4 (third class) timber railway station building constructed in western NSW in the late nineteenth century.
