= Fred Lowry =

Australian bushranger

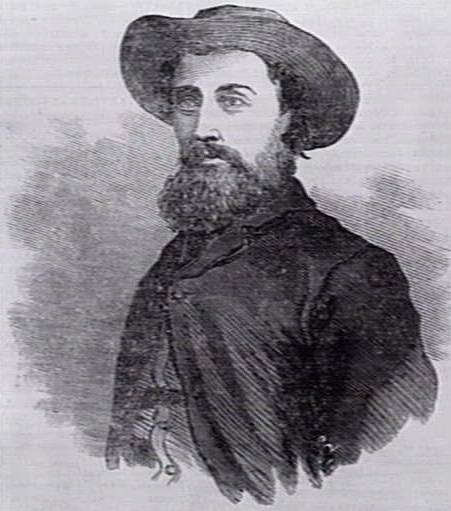
- Illustration of Fred Lowry by Samuel Calvert (Illustrated Melbourne Post, October 1863)
- Born: Thomas Frederick Lowry c. 1836; Windsor, New South Wales, Australia
- Died: 30 August 1863; Woodhouselee, New South Wales, Australia
- Cause of death: Gun-shot wound during apprehension by police
- Other names: Frederick McGregor; Samuel Barber; Boyd

Thomas Frederick Lowry (c. 1836 – 30 August 1863), better known as Fred Lowry, was an Australian bushranger whose crimes included horse theft, mail-coach robbery, prison escape, and assault with a deadly weapon. Lowry briefly rode with the Gardiner–Hall gang, but soon afterwards formed his own gang with John Foley.

His purported last words after being shot by police during apprehension, "Tell 'em I died game", cemented his place as the archetypal Australian bushranger.

== Biography ==
=== Early life ===
Thomas Frederick Lowry was born c. 1836 in Windsor, New South Wales, to former convicts, James Lowry and Ellen Jackson. Lowry had five siblings—three brothers and two sisters. The Lowry family eventually settled in the Young district inland of the Great Dividing Range, which had seen increasingly dense settlement since the early 1830s. Lowry and his brothers became stockmen and Lowry, who was described as gaunt and tall—exceeding six feet (180 centimetres)—gained a reputation as a good horseman and skillful horse-breaker.

In the early 1850s, when he was around 18 years old, Lowry began stealing cattle and developed a method of modifying brands by rubbing oil over the existing brand, covering it with a piece of oil-soaked hessian, and applying an iron to shape a forged brand.

=== Horse-stealing ===
In 1858 it was reported that "for some considerable time" a gang of horse-stealers had been operating in the Lachlan district and using the refuge of the Weddin mountains, south-west of Grenfell. Fred Lowry, using aliases such as Frederick McGregor and Samuel Barber, was described as the gang's "travelling agent or man of business", who had established an overland trade in horses between the Lachlan and Murrumbidgee districts. Lowry had an accomplice in the Murrumbidgee district who disposed of stolen horses from the Lachlan district and, in a mutual exchange arrangement, furnished Lowry with Murrumbidgee horses. Lowry was also involved in stealing horses in the Murrumbidgee district; on 25 June 1858 Thomas Lowry (alias Samuel Barber), described as a horse-breaker by profession, was suspected of stealing two horses from John Lupton, near Wagga Wagga.

In early July 1858, after information was received of the gang's whereabouts in the Weddin mountains, a party of police from Cowra and several volunteers set out in pursuit. After "scouring the country for five or six days" the police and volunteers arrived at a place called 'The Ladder', known as a rocky stronghold in the region. As the police came within sight Lowry broke cover and galloped away at speed. The pursuers set off after him, calling upon him to surrender, which he did after a shot was fired at him. Lowry was captured in company with Sarah McGregor (alias Cowell), described as "a lady of questionable repute, well known for her equestrian feats in the Weddin country" with whom Lowry "has been cohabiting with him for some time past". The police found two stolen horses in Lowry's possession: a bay gelding they believed was one of the horses stolen from John Lupton near Wagga Wagga and a bay mare and foal stolen from a station on 'The Levels'.

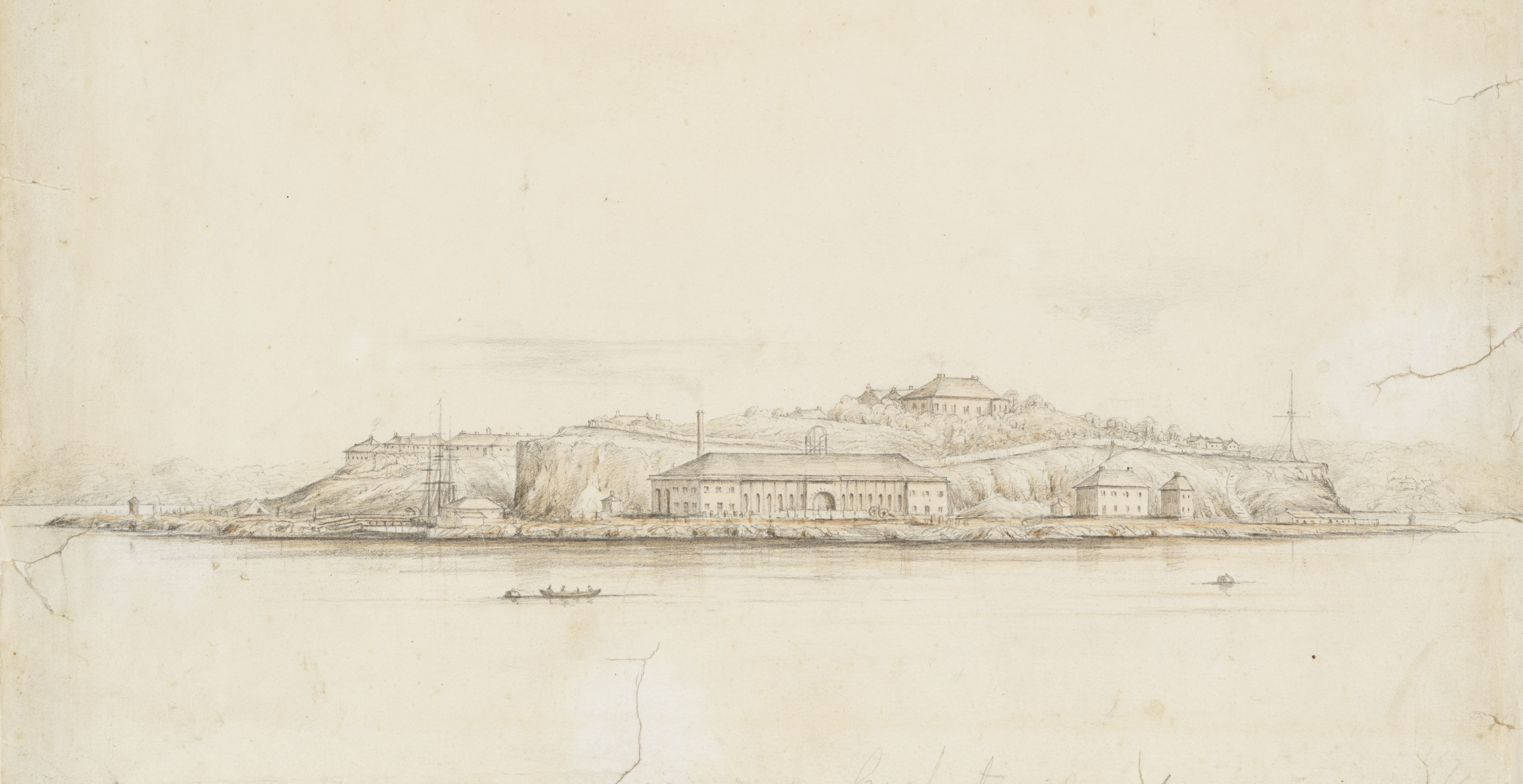
The Cockatoo Island prison, Sydney Harbour, where Fred Lowry was sentenced to five years' hard labour for horse-stealing in 1858

On their journey from the Weddin mountains to Bathurst the police patrol stopped for the night at King's Plains (near Blayney) and their two prisoners were placed in separate cells in the local lock-up. In the middle of the night the lock-up keeper, Constable Leonard, entered Sarah's cell and "made improper overtures to her, which she indignantly repulsed". Leonard "repeated this abominable conduct at a later hour of the night, but with no better success". When they reached Bathurst the two prisoners made a complaint to the authorities and the constable was suspended (and later charged with "having feloniously assaulted... a prisoner under his charge").

At the Bathurst Police Court on 22 July 1858 Frederick McGregor (alias Thomas Lowry, alias Samuel Barber) and Sarah McGregor (alias Cowell) were charged with horse-stealing, and remanded to appear again. On 5 August the pair were charged with stealing a bay horse from Joseph West's 'Oma' station near Bathurst. The case "was fully proved" and both prisoners were committed to stand trial at the Bathurst Court of Quarter sessions in early September 1858. Sarah McGregor was found to be not guilty and the charge was dismissed and Fred Lowry (under the name Frederick McGregor) was convicted of horse-stealing and sentenced on 8 September to five years' hard labour "on the roads". He was incarcerated in the prison established on Cockatoo Island in Sydney Harbour.

=== Bushranging ===
Fred Lowry served his time and was probably released from prison in 1862. He joined with John Foley, a skilled horseman from the Oberon district, and the two began committing robberies. Foley and Lowry were of a similar age.

On Sunday, 14 September 1862, the mail contractor, William Weston, was stuck-up by two armed men at a location called the Black Swamp, two miles from Wilson's inn between Cassilis and Mudgee. The bushrangers took the contractor's horse, mail-bags and saddle-bags. The horse was later recovered with the empty mail-bags fastened to the saddle. The bushrangers had their faces covered with crêpe, though at one stage the fabric fell from the face of one man whom Weston was able to identify as Fred Lowry (alias Boyd). On 20 September 1862 Fred Lowry (alias Boyd) and two others stuck up Mr. Lawrence and his men at 'Wilpingong' station near Reedy Creek (north of Rylstone) and robbed them of £29 in notes, a cheque and "two silver hunting watches".

On 2 October 1862 William Todd's store on the Fish River was held up by armed men and robbed of cash totalling about £50 (the number of offenders was initially reported as two). The men had their faces covered, but it was suspected that "Thomas Foley" was one of them. It was later reported that a man named John Cosgrove had been apprehended by the Bathurst Police on suspicion of being one of the men who robbed the store. Cosgrove was a known criminal previously associated with the bushranger, John Peisley. A later account maintained that it was in fact four men that robbed Todd's store and that two of the men had been apprehended (Cosgrove and one other). Of the two who had escaped, one was identified as Fred Lowry. The man initially identified as "Thomas Foley" was John Foley (later indicted for this offence).

=== Race meeting shooting ===
A race meeting was held on New Year's Day 1863 at a race-course on Daniel McGuirk's land in the Brisbane Valley, south-west of Oberon near the Native Dog Creek diggings. Amongst those who attended were Fred Lowry and John Foley, described as "two men for whom the police have been some time on the look-out". Towards evening after the races were concluded and the prize-money had been paid out, Lowry (by some accounts in a state of drunkenness) "attempted to bail up the persons present". Holding a revolver in each hand Lowry sought to drive a number of men towards the house. A man named Allen refused to move and Lowry struck him across the cheek with a revolver, which fired and struck a horse tethered nearby. At this a man named Patrick Foran came out of the house and rushed at Lowry, who fired again, hitting Foran in the chest. Despite his wound Foran held on to Lowry until others intervened and the assailant was secured. Lowry was conveyed under heavy guard to Bathurst gaol. The accounts of the events make no mention of John Foley after the shooting; it is assumed he made his departure when his companion was apprehended. A newspaper report of Lowry's capture made the following comments: "There are several charges of robbery against him, and his apprehension will be a source of gratification to the inhabitants of the district, to whom he has long been a terror and a pest".

=== Escape from Bathurst gaol ===
On 9 January Frederick Lowry was charged at Bathurst with shooting Patrick Foran with the intent to kill him. He was initially taken before Foran, lying wounded in a precarious state at McDonald's public-house, where depositions were taken, after which he was removed to the Court House before the bench of magistrates where other witnesses were examined.

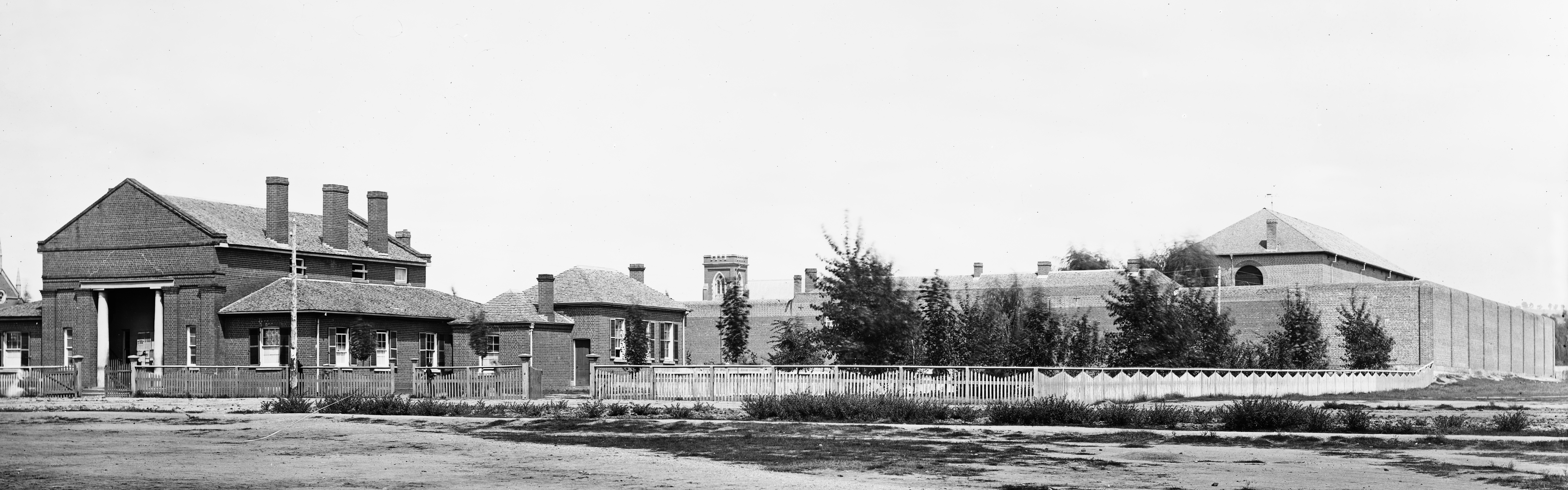
The courthouse and gaol at Bathurst (photographed in the early 1870s)

Mid-morning on 13 February 1863 Fred Lowry and four other prisoners escaped from Bathurst Gaol through a hole they had made in the western side of the prison wall. The section of the wall through which they escaped was described as being "in a very rotten state" where the bricks could be easily removed. The prisoners were in the exercise yard and a group of them congregated in one corner to hide from view two of their number being engaged in removing bricks from the wall by means of a pickaxe (thought to have been obtained from a member of the prison road gang). A member of the public observed the prisoners escaping and raised the alarm and the police and warders were soon afterwards in active pursuit. Two of the men were recaptured in the township and another several hours later seven miles away. Two others, Fred Lowry and William Woodhardt, managed to evade capture. Rewards were offered for the apprehension of the escaped prisoners (or such information leading to their apprehension); in the case of Lowry, the reward offered was £100, and for Woodhardt, £50.

=== Bushranging resumed ===
Mid-morning on Tuesday, 24 February 1863, Fred Lowry "forcibly entered" the public-house of Cornelius Hewett, a publican at Grabben Gullen (south-west of Crookwell) armed with a butcher's knife. Lowry stole a rifle, a pistol, a flask of powder, a bottle of gin and twelve shillings in cash. He also stole a horse from a man who was passing the public-house at the time.

Just before dawn on Wednesday, 6 May 1863, four horsemen later identified as members of the Gardiner-Hall gang passed through the township of Bowning, north-west of Yass, riding at a leisurely pace. On the road near the township they passed the Binalong mail, without interrupting its progress. Riding in the vehicle was a passenger who had previously been stuck-up by Frank Gardiner and John Gilbert, and also knew John O'Meally and Fred Lowry by sight, and so claimed to recognise the riders as they passed. However, the identification of Gardiner was not correct as Gardiner had already made his way to Queensland by this time; it is more likely the fourth man was Ben Hall (based on a later identification). The men were mounted on "fine upstanding horses" and each man had a brace of Colt revolvers in his belt and a double-barrelled gun slung from the saddle. The Yass police were alerted and later came in contact with the bushrangers as they passed the township; the police pursued them along the road towards Bungendore, but eventually abandoned the chase in the Nanima district.

In the early hours of Monday morning, 18 May 1863, the mail-cart from Queanbeyan to Sydney was held up by a group of four armed men at a locality known as the Sand-hills, about three miles from Boro (ten miles east of Bungendore). During the robbery the mailman dared to hold up a lamp in order to throw light on the faces of the bushrangers; realising his intent, the mailman "was told to desist, or they would put a bullet in him". After they had rifled through the contents of the mail-bags, the bushrangers burned the contents of the bags. Even though the men's faces were covered with crêpe, the mailman was of the opinion the men who robbed him were Ben Hall, John Gilbert, John O'Meally and Fred Lowry. The offenders had been in the area for several days beforehand, as there were reports of shepherds' huts being robbed of rations. It was supposed that the bushrangers had intended to rob a gold escort that had passed along the road, but it was too well-guarded, so they chose to rob the mail instead.

At about mid-morning on 21 June 1863 John McBride, a miner living on the Twelve Mile Rush diggings, was on his way to nearby Young township when he came upon two men being stuck-up by two armed men on horseback (later identified as John Gilbert and Fred Lowry). McBride was armed with a revolver; seeing the robbery in progress he went off the road into the bush and fired at the two bushrangers. Gilbert and Lowry returned fire and separated so they were each side of McBride. The gun-fight ended when McBride was shot in the thigh and, after having discharged his last shot, the miner collapsed beside a tree. Gilbert dismounted and rifled McBride's pockets for a few shillings and stole his revolver. They then left the wounded man. Two hundred yards further on Gilbert and Lowry stuck up three other men and said to them: "If you've got any money you had better hand it over, or we might serve you the same as we have served a 'bravado' that we have just shot in the leg, and is lying by a tree close by." When found McBride was carried to a nearby hut. A doctor attended him later that day but did not consider the wound to be of serious concern. During the night the wounded man was delirious and when the doctor returned the following day he reluctantly agreed for him to be admitted to hospital. A spring cart was sent for but McBride died during the journey. A day or two after the shooting John Gilbert was reportedly "carousing" at a public-house a few miles from Young and was proudly showing a "handsome revolver" he had taken "from a ----- trap in fair fight". It was explained that McBride, from whom the revolver was taken, "always adopted the style and costume of a trooper out of uniform i.e., with revolver in belt, Bedford cord pants, and long polished boots, &c.", and so Gilbert had mistaken him for a policeman.

=== Goulburn mail robbery ===
On the early afternoon of 3 July 1863 Cobb and Co.'s coach was bailed up by two armed men within a quarter of an hour of its departure from Goulburn, still within sight of the township and less than a mile from the police barracks. The incident was described as "the coolest case of bushranging perhaps ever recorded". The coach was carrying mail for Sydney. The contents of the mail-bags were ransacked and one of the three passengers, Mr. Copeland, was robbed of £15 and his watch. While the robbery was in progress two men rode up, unaware of what was happening until too late when the pair were forced to dismount at gunpoint. One of the men, Captain Morphy, was robbed of a gold watch and chain. Other passers-by were also stopped and robbed by the bushrangers. One traveller who was stopped, Mr. March of Jerrara, remonstrated with the bushrangers, telling them "he had just buried two sons, and needed the money more than they", in response to which the outlaws returned his money to him. After they had finished examining the mailbags the bushrangers rode off towards the Cookbundoon range (north-east of the township).

Even though the bushrangers who held up the Goulburn mail did not attempt to disguise themselves, their identity was not immediately established. The correspondent to the Sydney Mail newspaper speculated that they belonged "to the Abercrombie or Bathurst side". After Fred Lowry was fatally wounded two months later the gold watch he had stolen from Captain Morphy was found in his possession and three witnesses, including Morphy and the driver of the coach, Michael Curran, positively identified the deceased Lowry as one of the two bushrangers who had robbed the coach outside of Goulburn. Lowry's companion was almost certainly John Foley; the two of them were later proven to have held up the Mudgee mail, just ten days after the Goulburn mail robbery.

=== Mudgee mail robbery ===
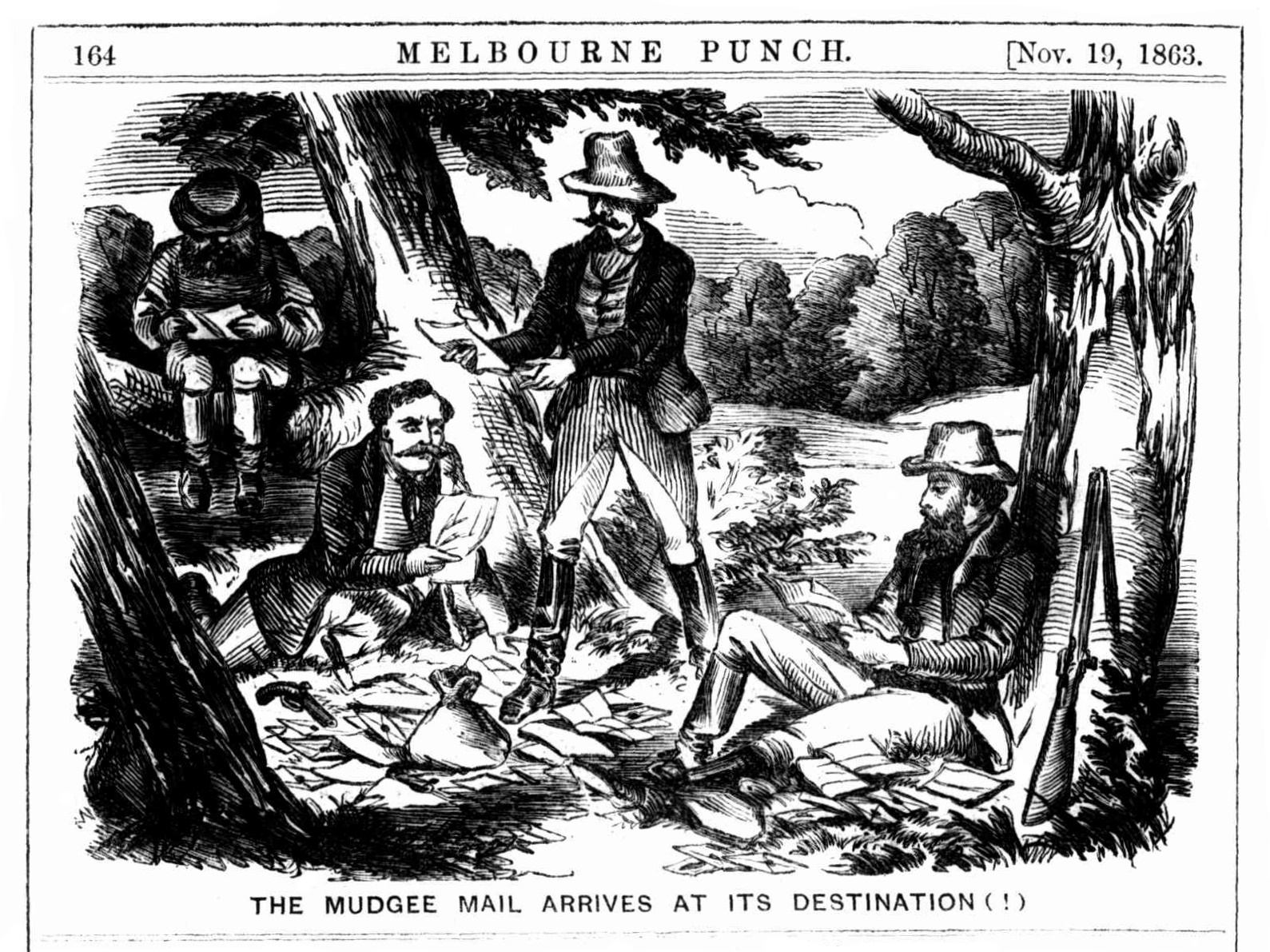
'The Mudgee mail arrives at its destination (!)', a satirical response to the lucrative mail-coach robbery by Lowry and Foley (Melbourne Punch, November 1863)

Late in the morning of Monday, 13 July 1863, Cobb and Co.'s Mudgee mail coach was held up by two bushrangers. The coach had left Mudgee the previous evening with one passenger, Henry Kater, the accountant of the Mudgee branch of the Australian Joint Stock Bank. Kater had charge of a parcel of bank-notes amounting to £5,700. Along the way the coach picked up another passenger, Mrs. Smith, the wife of an inn-keeper at Ben Bullen. At the time of the robbery the coach was ascending the steep rise known as 'Big Hill', sixteen miles from Bowenfels. Two men on horseback came down the hill and bailed up the coach-driver and Kater, who was walking alongside the coach because of the steep incline. The coach-driver was ordered to drive into the bush.

When they were off the road the accountant, Kater, was robbed of a revolver and a gold watch and chain. The mail-bags were taken down from the box and the letters opened, looking for cash and valuables. When the parcel of bank-notes was discovered Kater told them the notes would be useless, as they were old and were being taken to Sydney to be destroyed, to which one of them responded, "Never mind, we can make a bonfire of them". Before they left the robbers told the coachman to unharness the horses, who were then driven into the bush as the bushrangers departed.

After the bushrangers had left Henry Kater and the coach-driver, William Tinker, went to try and catch the horses, but without success. When they returned Mrs. Smith told them she had seen "a third man follow in the direction the bushrangers had taken". The third man was Larry Cummins, who probably had the role of keeping watch on the road during the robbery by Lowry and Foley. Kater eventually made his way to Hartley and reported the robbery, after which four mounted police set off to search for the offenders.

The identity of the Mudgee mail bushrangers was not determined immediately. Soon afterwards the police arrested three suspects, but when the coach-driver and passengers gave evidence they did not recognise them as the men who robbed the coach, they were discharged. Eventually it was determined that two of the offenders were the wanted men, Frederick Lowry and John Foley (both of whom were later found with bank-notes from the robbery in their possession). The full list of issuing banks and serial numbers of the stolen bank-notes was published (taking up nearly three entire newspaper columns), together with an offer of a £500 reward from the bank, to anyone "who will give such information a will lead to the conviction of the offenders, or the recovery of the said notes".

On 3 August 1863 seventeen residents of the Fish River district signed a letter sent to their local parliamentary representative, William Cummings, the member for East Macquarie in the New South Wales Legislative Assembly. The letter pointed out that "not a single policeman" was stationed along the road from Hartley to Goulburn and that the perpetrators of the two recent robberies (the Goulburn and Mudgee mail coaches) "in each instance took this road". The letter also claimed that John Foley and Fred Lowry (described as "a most notorious nest of Highway Robbers") were "living publicly on this road having recently built stabling, house, etc. upon Government Ground". The letter concluded that the road "seems to be a kind of back door for the escape of any scoundrel that thinks proper to turn Highwayman".

=== Capture and death ===
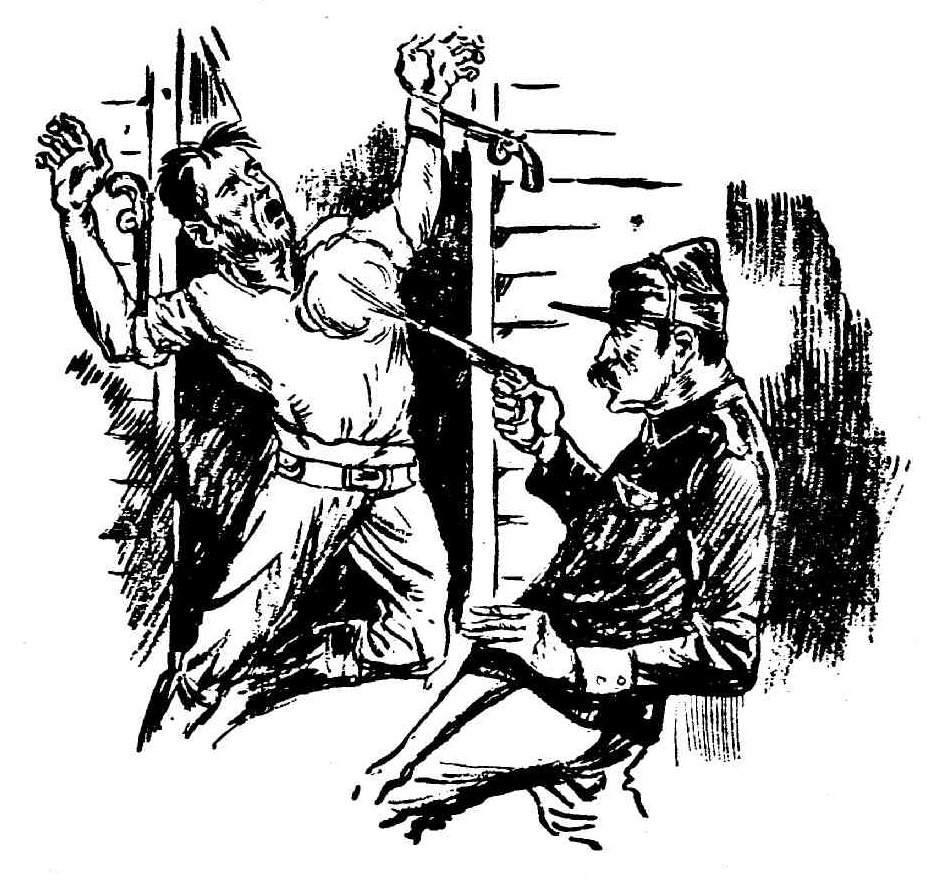
An artist's impression of the wounding of Fred Lowry by senior-sergeant Stephenson (published in The World's News (Sydney), November 1928)

Early on Saturday morning, 29 August 1863, four policemen arrived at the Limerick Races Inn, Thomas Vardy's public-house on Cook's Vale Creek about 20 miles north of Crookwell. The contingent—Senior-sergeant James Stephenson, Detectives Camphin and Sanderson, and Constable Herbst—arrived as a result of information received indicating that Frederick Lowry was present within. Stephenson positioned Herbst and Camphin at the rear and front of the house before he and Sanderson entered. When asked if he had any strangers in the house, the owner indicated the room they were in. Stephenson found the door to the room locked and "knocked and asked for admittance". Receiving no reply, he declared that if the door was not opened, he would break it open. A shot was fired through the door from inside and wounded Stephenson's horse tethered outside. Stephenson went outside and moved his horse; as he returned to the house, Fred Lowry emerged from his room with a revolver in each hand, calling out "I'm Lowry; come on ye b⸻s, and I'll fight ye fair". Both men fired. A shot by Lowry hit the barrel of Stephenson's revolver and caused minor injury. According to Stephenson, his second shot, which struck Lowry in the throat, caused Lowry to drop his revolvers, at which point Stephenson "seized him by the neck" and struck him with his revolver. Lowry continued to struggle, so Sanderson assisted in dragging the bushranger into the yard where he was handcuffed and subdued.

Leaving Sanderson in charge of the prisoner Stephenson and Detective Camphin proceeded to the room in which Lowry had stayed, where they found Larry Cummins, who was brought to the yard and handcuffed. A search of the room revealed a watch stolen from Captain Morphy near Goulburn in early July and £164 in notes later identified as being stolen from the Mudgee mail in mid-July. Senior-sergeant Stephenson also arrested the publican, Thomas Vardy, his two step-sons and three others who were on the premises, all of them later charged with "harbouring bushrangers and with being accessory to robberies after the fact".

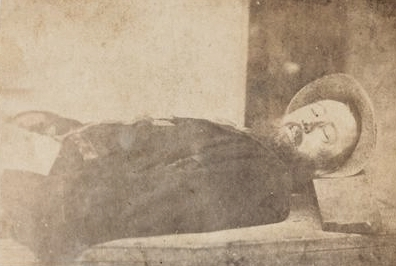
Fred Lowry, photographed after his death by George Gregory

The policemen secured horses and a dray to convey Lowry to Goulburn. The wounded prisoner "suffered very much on the way, choking in the throat". They arrived at Woodhouselee on nightfall, sixteen miles from their destination. Having determined the dray-horses would not reach Goulburn, Stephenson decided to stop at Pratton's public-house and despatched a messenger to Goulburn for a doctor. Dr. Waugh arrived at three in the morning and, establishing that Lowry's wound was fatal, told the bushranger "he had best prepare to meet his Maker". Fred Lowry died at about six o'clock on Sunday morning, 30 August. His body was conveyed to Goulburn later that morning.

On Monday, 1 September, the district coroner, Dr. Waugh, held an inquest at the Goulburn hospital before a jury regarding the death of Frederick Lowry. Evidence was presented regarding the autopsy, Lowry's identity and details of the events leading to his death. The jury returned a verdict of justifiable homicide and found that the dead man was Thomas Frederick Lowry. The jury added the following statement to their verdict: "That it is our opinion that great praise is due to senior-sergeant Stephenson, for his active, judicious, and courageous conduct on the occasion".

Despite the verdict of the jury there appeared to be some ongoing doubt that the dead man was the bushranger, Fred Lowry. A warder of the Goulburn gaol and Henry Kater, the accountant in charge of the parcel of bank-notes stolen from the Mudgee mail, arrived at Goulburn on Thursday, September 4, in order to identify the body. However, Kater was unable to make a positive identification, "though he stated there was a resemblance in the features". Since the inquest earlier in the week Lowry's moustache and beard had been shaved off in order to take a plaster cast of the features. Notwithstanding Kater's hesitation, the warder of the Goulburn gaol was able to confidently identify the man as Lowry.

=== Aftermath ===
On 24 September 1863 at the Goulburn Assizes the publican, Thomas Vardy, was charged with harbouring Lawrence Cummins (who had been convicted of armed robbery just prior to Vardy's trial). After hearing the evidence the jury returned a verdict of not guilty, however, the prisoner was remanded on a further charge of harbouring Frederick Lowry. When Vardy appeared on the following day to face that charge, the prosecution announced they did not intend to proceed with the trial on that occasion. The publican was dismissed after entering into "his own recognizance". Vardy's two step-sons, charged with the same offence, were also dismissed.

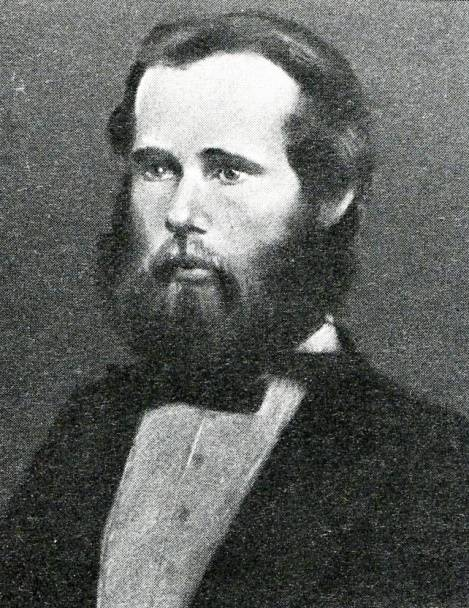
Senior-sergeant (later sub-inspector) James Stephenson (1831–1908)

In September 1863 the policeman who shot Lowry, James Stephenson, was promoted to Sub-Inspector. In October the Board of Directors of the Australian Joint Stock Bank voted to grant an amount of £400 (in addition to £100 already paid) for "the capture of Lowry and Foley, the robbers of the Mudgee mail... for distribution among the men, whose excellent conduct entitles them to reward". The reward was equally divided between the four policemen who captured Lowry and three constables and a black tracker who had captured Foley. The reward of £100 offered by the Government for Lowry's capture was equally shared between the four policeman involved in Lowry's capture—Sub-inspector (then Senior-sergeant) Stephenson, Detectives Camphin and Sanderson and Constable Herbst. In December 1863 a testimonial was held at Goulburn honouring Sub-inspector Stephenson, where he was presented with an inscribed silver salver and purse of sovereigns raised by public subscription.

Foley's share of the money stolen from the Mudgee mail was recovered after his arrest in August 1863, but Lowry's share was not found, and over time a number of the bank-notes began to be circulated. A number of businesses and tradesmen at Bathurst took stolen notes in the ordinary course of their business, and were only made aware of the status of the notes after depositing their takings in the bank. Several respected tradesmen were summoned to answer for having the notes in their possession, but the "high-handed action of the police and bank authorities" led to ill-feelings in the community.

In November 1863 a man named William Slattery was drinking at Robert Dunsmore's public-house at Dirty Swamp (now Locksley), on the Fish River south-east of Bathurst. Before he left Slattery asked the publican to take care of a bundle of £5 notes for him, to be called for at a later date. Dunsmore accepted the trust, but his suspicions were aroused. He took the bundle of notes, and some others passed by Slattery at the hotel, to the Police Magistrate in Bathurst who ascertained the bank-notes had come from the Mudgee mail robbery. Slattery later admitted to Dunsmore that the notes had come from the mail robbery, and that he was receiving 30 per cent of the value for cashing them, but declined to say who had given him the money. Slattery was eventually convicted of knowingly possessing the stolen money and sentenced to five years' hard labour on the roads.

== Cultural legacy ==
=== 'Tell 'em I died game' ===
Fred Lowry's purported last words, "Tell 'em I died game", have entered bushranging lore to represent the archetypal dying words of the Australian outlaw of the nineteenth century. However, these were not Lowry's final words, nor is the quote entirely accurate. At the inquest into the death of Frederick Lowry, Detective William Camphin gave evidence that, as the bushranger lay dying at Woodhouselee, Lowry told him that "he had a brother-in-law named Elliott in the employ of a person named Cummins living on the Lachlan, and he wished me to let him know that he had died game". Lowry reportedly added that "he had always said that he would not be taken alive but would fight for it; he said that the reason why he fought so was that he knew he should be hung if taken, that he didn't like to die a coward". Lowry's request that Detective Camphin inform his brother-in-law "that he had died game" has, after constant re-telling, undergone a transformation and is frequently invoked as Lowry's last words, reshaped as the more generalised statement, "Tell 'em I died game".

A commentator writing in 1867, quoting Lowry as saying "Tell my uncle (sic) that I died game!", was in no doubt about the intent of the bushranger's words: "by showing that he died 'game', and in a manner consistent with the lawless life which provoked such a death, [Lowry] thought he should obtain praise and fame of those whose associate he was, and be talked of more as a hero than as a ruffian".

The characterisation of "Tell 'em I died game" as Fred Lowry's last words was fashioned by George E. Boxall in his history of the Australian bushrangers, first published in 1899. George Eedes Boxall was born in London in 1836 and arrived with his family in Australia in 1850 as a fourteen-year-old. By 1880 Boxall was working in Sydney as an engraver, and later as a journalist and editorial assistant for the Australian Town and Country Journal. By the mid-1890s he had returned to England where his The Story of the Australian Bushrangers was published in 1899. The second edition in 1902 was renamed The History of the Australian Bushrangers. The book was a success in Australia and has been re-published in many editions ever since. However, Boxall's history of Australian bushrangers is riddled with inaccuracies and invented details. Despite the myriad inaccuracies Boxall's bushranging history continues to be reprinted by a variety of publishers (with the work now in the public domain).

=== Folk-ballad ===
Australian folklorist, John Meredith, collected and published a ballad called The Death of Fred Lowry, which came about as a result of a collecting trip in early 1983 in the foothills of the Great Dividing Range south of Bathurst. The lyrics were remembered by Kevin Hotham, who had grown up in the village of Black Springs, the locality where Lowry's partner in crime, John Foley, had lived for his remaining years after his release from gaol in the mid-1870s. The song's melody was recalled by Thelma Cook of nearby Tuena.

From the opening verse the song represents Fred Lowry in a romantic and sympathetic light:

Come all young men and gentle maids,
come listen now to me;
'Til I relate a cruel fate
of one both bold and free,
who fell while fighting the police,
he to the last was game;
A gallant fine young man he was,
Fred Lowry was his name.

The song depicts the police as cowards, outnumbering and surrounding the heroic and defiant bushranger, who vows: "My life I'll sell it dear".

At length brave Lowry he stepped out,
a pistol in each hand,
saying, come on you cowardly troopers,
I'll fight you man for man.

In the ensuing gunfight Lowry keeps the troopers at bay for an hour and a half; at length he is wounded "near the heart" from a "coward's aim" (significantly different from the historical version of events). The dying man requests that the police convey his appeal for forgiveness to "a lovely maiden" who was his "only joy". A doctor is called for, but "there is no hope... the ball has pierced a vital spot, he'll soon be out of pain".

The dying man tried hard to speak,
his mouth was full of gore;
He closed his eyes and gave a sigh,
Fred Lowry was no more.

== See also ==
- Gardiner–Hall gang
- John Foley (bushranger)
- Larry Cummins (bushranger)
