= Gardiner–Hall gang =

19th-century criminal gang in Australia

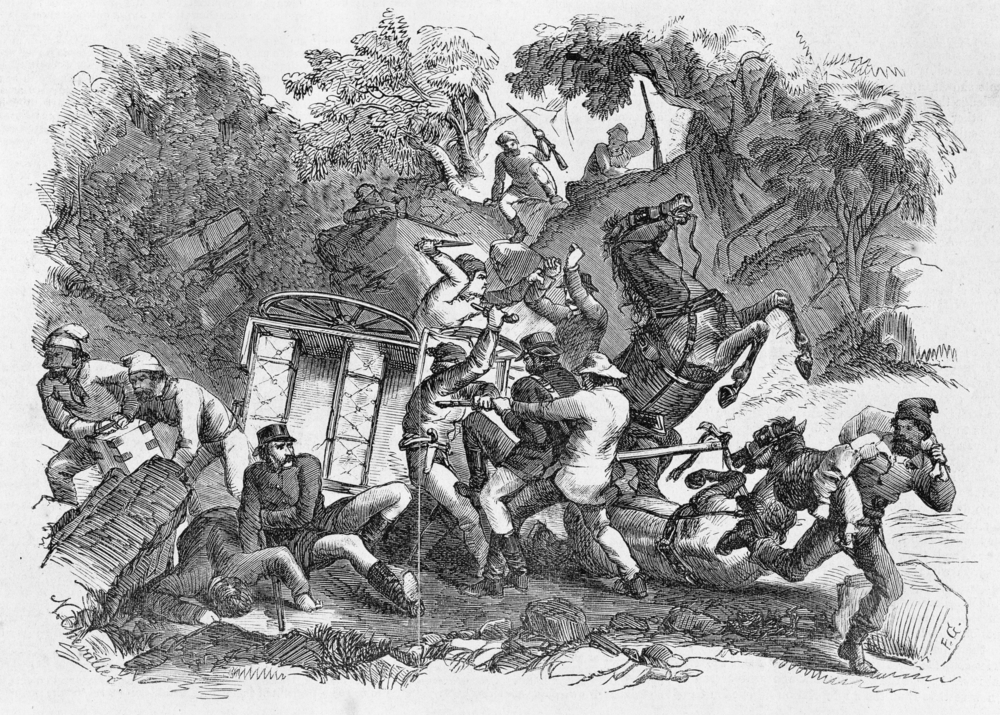
The robbery at Eugowra Rocks, 1862

The Gardiner–Hall Gang was an informal group of bushrangers who roamed the central west of the Colony of New South Wales, Australia in the 1860s. Named after leaders Frank Gardiner and Ben Hall, the gang was involved in numerous shootouts and robberies, including Australia's largest ever gold robbery, at Eugowra Rocks. The gang formed in 1861 and its demise came with the execution of John Dunn in 1866.

Several members of the gang, in particular Ben Hall, have become prominent figures in Australian folklore, inspiring numerous songs, films, plays and other cultural depictions.

== Known members and fate ==
- John Bow: sentenced to death, later commuted to fifteen years in prison
- Michael Burke: committed suicide via gunshot after being shot in the stomach
- Dan Charters: caught, testified against the gang
- John Connors: one of the "Three Jacks"
- Larry Cummins: sentenced to fifteen years in prison
- Patrick Daley: sentenced to fifteen years in prison, served ten, and later became a prominent and wealthy resident of Wrightville.
- John Davis, one of the "Three Jacks": wounded in gunfight with the police, sentenced to 15 years in prison
- James Dunleavy: gaoled in April 1865 after being sentenced to fifteen years’ imprisonment with hard labour at the Bathurst Circuit Court for armed robbery (six separate charges); died of consumption in October 1868 (aged 24 years) at Darlinghurst Gaol.
- John Dunn: hanged
- Francis Foley (younger brother of notorious bushranger John Foley): sentenced to ten years in prison
- Alexander Fordyce: sentenced to death, later commuted to fifteen years in prison

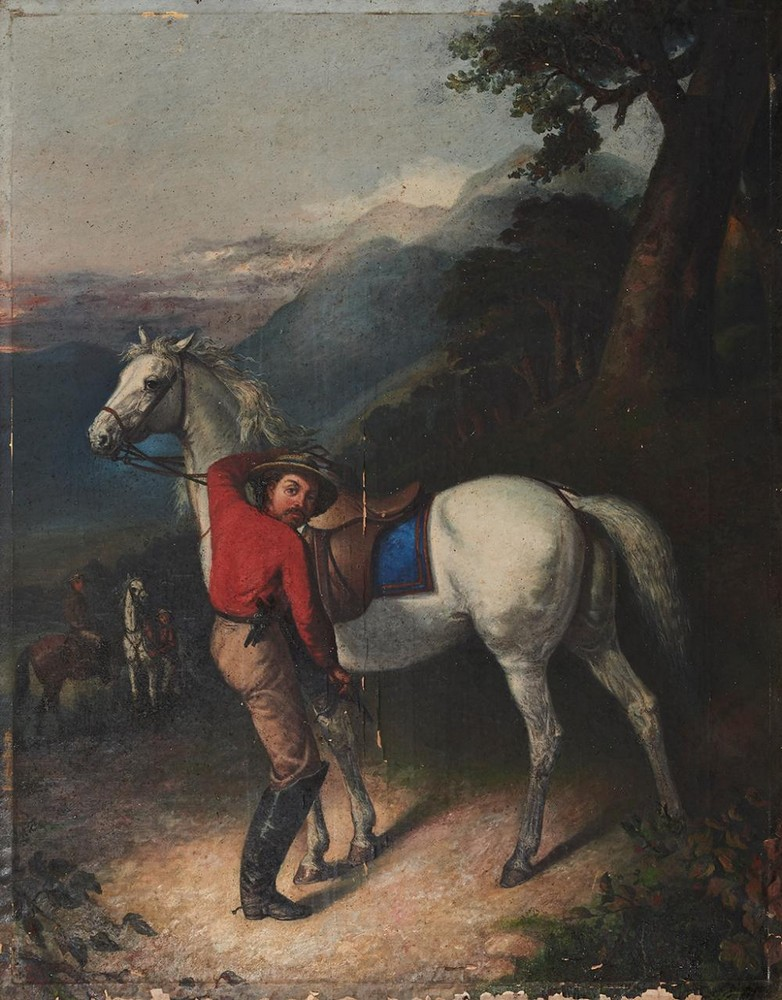
Painting of Gardiner, 1867

- Frank Gardiner: sentenced to 32 years in prison (served 10 years and then exiled from Australia)
- John Gilbert: shot dead by police
- Ben Hall: shot dead by police
- Fred Lowry: shot dead by police
- Henry Manns: hanged
- John McGuiness: one of the "Three Jacks"; shot dead (probably by Gardiner for leaving Davis alone to fight police)
- James Mount ('Old Man'), alias Gordon: charged in November 1864 at Forbes with armed robbery of Pearce and Hilliard's store at Canowindra in June 1864 in company with Ben Hall and one other; sentenced to twenty five years in prison.
- John O’Meally: shot dead
- John Peisley: tried for the murder of William Benyon, convicted and executed in April 1862.
- John Vane: sentenced to fifteen years in prison, paroled after six years
- William Woodhart: ran with Lowry and Gardiner, after escaping with Lowry from Bathurst Gaol on 13 February 1863; captured at Braidwood in May 1863, sentenced to three years (on top of a previous five-year sentence for horse stealing).
- John Youngman: skipped bail and disappeared.

== Timeline of gang activities ==
Frank Gardiner was granted a ticket of leave in December 1859 on the condition of staying in the Carcoar district, and he soon joined up with John Peisley. Johnny Gilbert joined them soon afterwards, and the gang started stealing cattle and horses. Gardiner's ticket of leave was revoked when a warrant for his arrest for cattle stealing was issued.

Gardiner had a partnership with William Fogg in a butcher shop at Spring Creek. Gardiner supplied Fogg with stolen cattle, and Fogg would slaughter the cattle and sell the meat.

=== 1861 ===
- May: Gardiner, Peisley and Gilbert robbed mail in Cowra.
- 16 July: Sgt. John Middleton and Constable William Hosie went to Fogg's house in search of Gardiner. He was briefly captured after a gunfight, but he was rescued by Peisley and John Gilbert, who ambushed the police on their return to town.
- 28 December: Peisley shot William Benyon, an innkeeper at Bigga, who died seven days later.

=== 1862 ===
- 12 January: Peisley was captured and committed for trial by the Carcoar bench for murdering Benyon. Within two months he was convicted and hanged at Bathurst.
- January: "The Three Jacks" – Davis, McGuinness, and Connors – committed their first robberies with Gardiner.
- 10 April: Davis was wounded four times by police near Lambing Flat. His companions, the other two Jacks, escaped.
- 13 April: McGuiness was found dead near where Davis was captured; he had been shot.
- 14 April: Gardiner, Hall, Youngman, and Gilbert robbed dray near Forbes.

In 1862, John Gilbert was first named as an accomplice of Gardiner when they and two others held up a storekeeper. Just over a month later, John Gilbert was involved in another robbery, this time with Gardiner and Ben Hall. From then on John Gilbert was identified as being involved in several hold-ups between Lambing Flat and Lachlan.

- 25 April: Peisley was hanged in Bathurst.

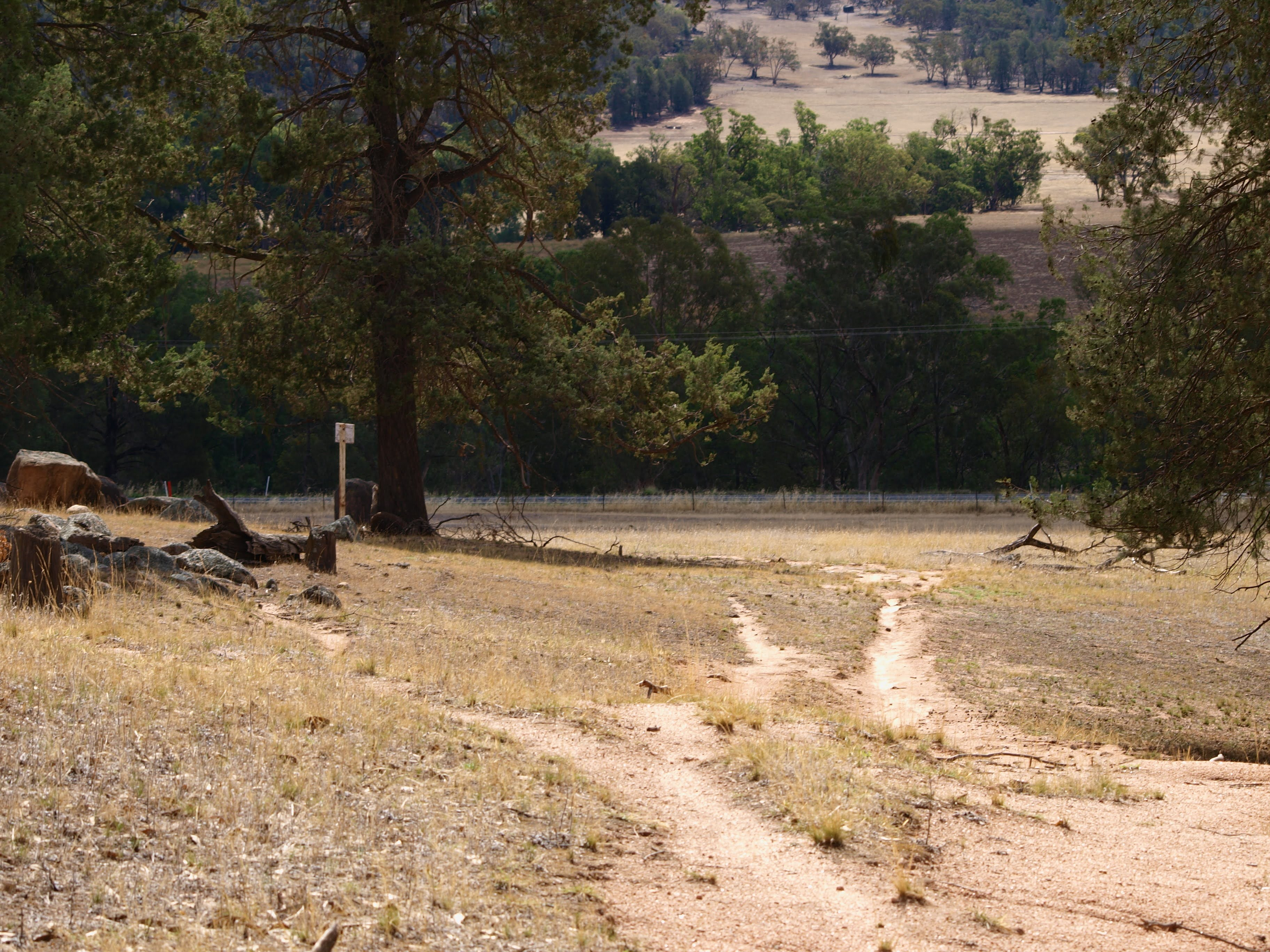
Location of the robbery at Eugowra Rocks

- 15 June: Frank Gardiner enlisted the assistance of John Gilbert, Ben Hall, John O'Meally, Dan Charters, Henry Manns, Alexander Fordyce, and Johnny Bow to rob the Forbes gold escort, at a place called Eugowra Rocks, of banknotes and 2700 ounces of gold worth more than £14,000.
- 27 July: Hall and several others were arrested. Charters turned Queen's evidence but failed to name Hall or O'Meally.
- 23 August: Hall was released. Gardiner left the district and escaped to Queensland.

=== 1863 ===
- 1 January: Fred Lowry shot a man whilst robbing the Brisbane Valley races (near the head of Fish River Creek) with John Foley. Lowry robbed settlers at Wambanamba. Lowry shot John Mcbride, who died from his leg wound.
- 13 February: Fred Lowry had been captured and placed in Bathurst Jail. On 13 February he had a mattock secreted into the jail and smashed a hole in the jail wall. Five prisoners escaped. Three escapees were caught that day. Fred Lowry and William Woodhart escaped capture. Lowry and Woodhart joined up with Gardiner.
- 12 May: William Woodhart caught at Fowlow by Senior Constable Reilly and brought into Braidwood.
- 13 July: Johnny Gilbert and John O'Meally, led by Ben Hall, held up the Commercial Bank at Carcoar. A brave teller in the bank fired a shot into the ceiling of the bank, thwarting the robbery. The manager was shot outside the bank as he was returning to the bank, and the gang fled without seizing anything. This was Australia's first bank robbery, and it took place in broad daylight.
- 13 July: Lowry, with Cummins and John Foley, robbed the Mudgee mailcoach.
- 30 July, an attempt was made to rob the Commercial Bank in Carcoar and later the store at Caloola was robbed by two men, believed to be John Gilbert and John O'Meally. The storekeeper rode to Bathurst to inform the police about the robbery.
- August: John O'Meally shot dead John Barnes, a shopkeeper near Wallendbeen.

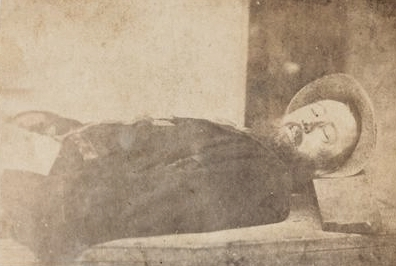
Lowry's body

- 30 August: Fred Lowry died from wounds after a shootout with police at Crookwell the night before. Cummins was arrested.
- 7 September: Francis Foley was sentenced to ten years "on the roads", with the first year in irons. Francis' brother, John Foley, was sentenced on the same day to fifteen years hard labour, with the first three in irons.
- 23 September: Hall, Gilbert, O'Meally, Vane, and Burke raided Caloola, ransacking the store, taking what they needed and willfully destroying the rest—as revenge for the storekeeper having given information to the police (see 30 July above)—before adjourning to Caloola's public house and carousing, until ten o'clock at night.
- 23 September 1863, Patrick Daley sentenced to fifteen years on the roads
- 27 September: First raid on Canowindra.

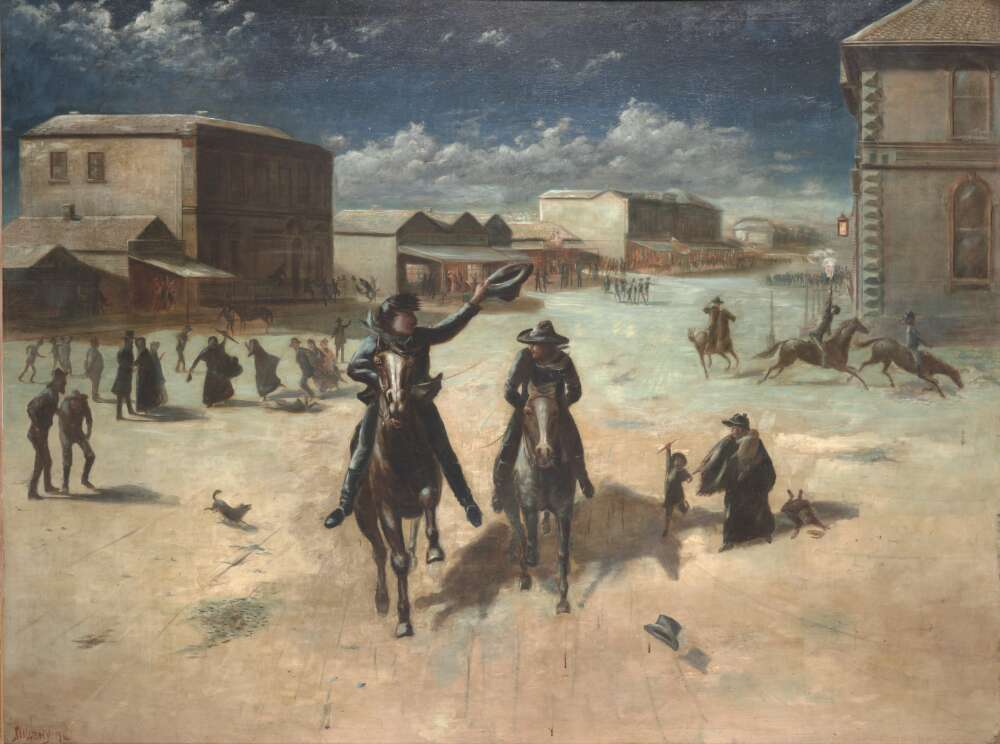
The gang attacks Bathurst

- 1 October: John Gilbert, Ben Hall, John O’Meally, and two Mount Macquarie lads, John Vane and Micky Burke, held up a jeweller’s shop and the Sportsman’s Arms Hotel in Bathurst in broad daylight. They exchanged shots with police as they made their escape down George Street. Three days later they returned to rob more stores, houses, and hotels on the outskirts of the town.
- 12 October: Hall and his gang bailed up Robinson's Hotel in Canowindra and held all the people of the town captive for three days. The hostages were allegedly not mistreated, and were provided with entertainment. The local policeman was subjected to humiliation by being locked in his own cell. When the hostages were set free, the gang insisted on paying the hotelier and giving the townspeople "expenses".
- 24 October: Twenty-year-old Michael Burke’s bushranging career ended at Rockley. Holding up Gold Commissioner Keightley, he was wounded in the stomach and, believing he was about to die, shot himself in the head. While he was still alive and in pain, one of his friends killed him (the coroner named Hall as the person who fired the shot).
- 3 November: Third raid on Canowindra.
- 18 November: John Vane surrendered to police. Vane was sentenced to fifteen years; he was released in 1870.

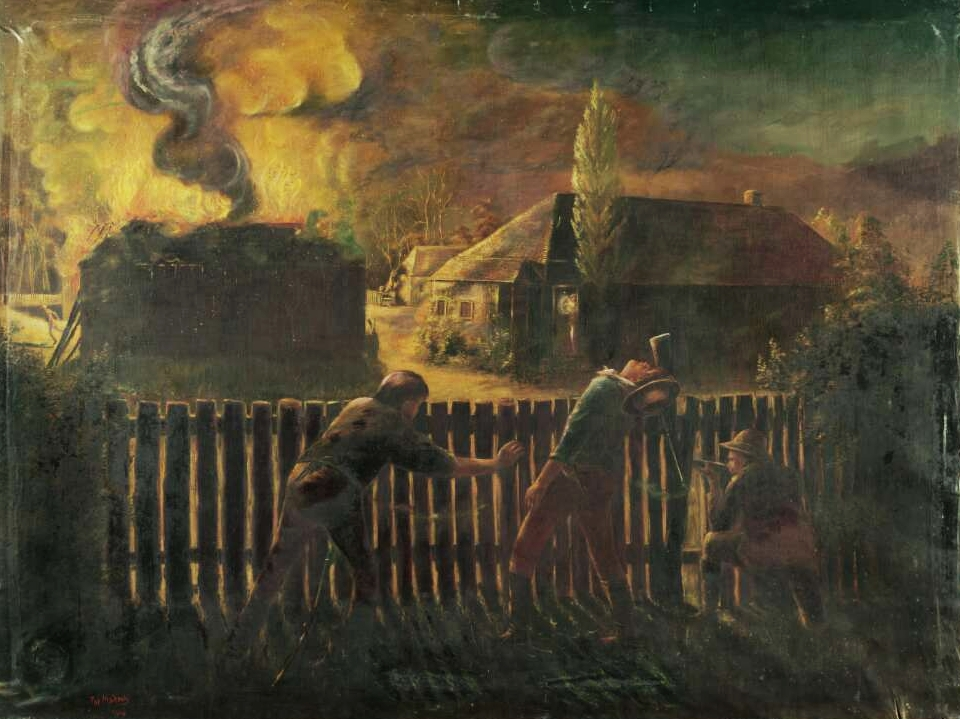
P. W. Marony's painting The Battle of Goimbla shows O'Meally being fatally shot and the burning of the homestead.

- 19 November: John O'Meally was shot dead during a raid on Goimbla station.
- December: Dunleavy and Mount joined the gang.

=== 1864 ===
- 24 March: Frank Gardiner was living at Apis Creek near Rockhampton, Queensland, where he was running a general store. He was recognised and reported to the police in Sydney. Gardiner was arrested and taken back to Sydney, and sentenced to 32 years hard labour.
- 16 June: William Fogg Sentenced to 7 years hard labor at Yass Quarter Sessions for maliciously killing cattle.
- 25 September: The gang robbed a mail coach near Yass.
- October: Dunleavy and Mount were arrested by police; Dunn joined Ben Hall's gang.

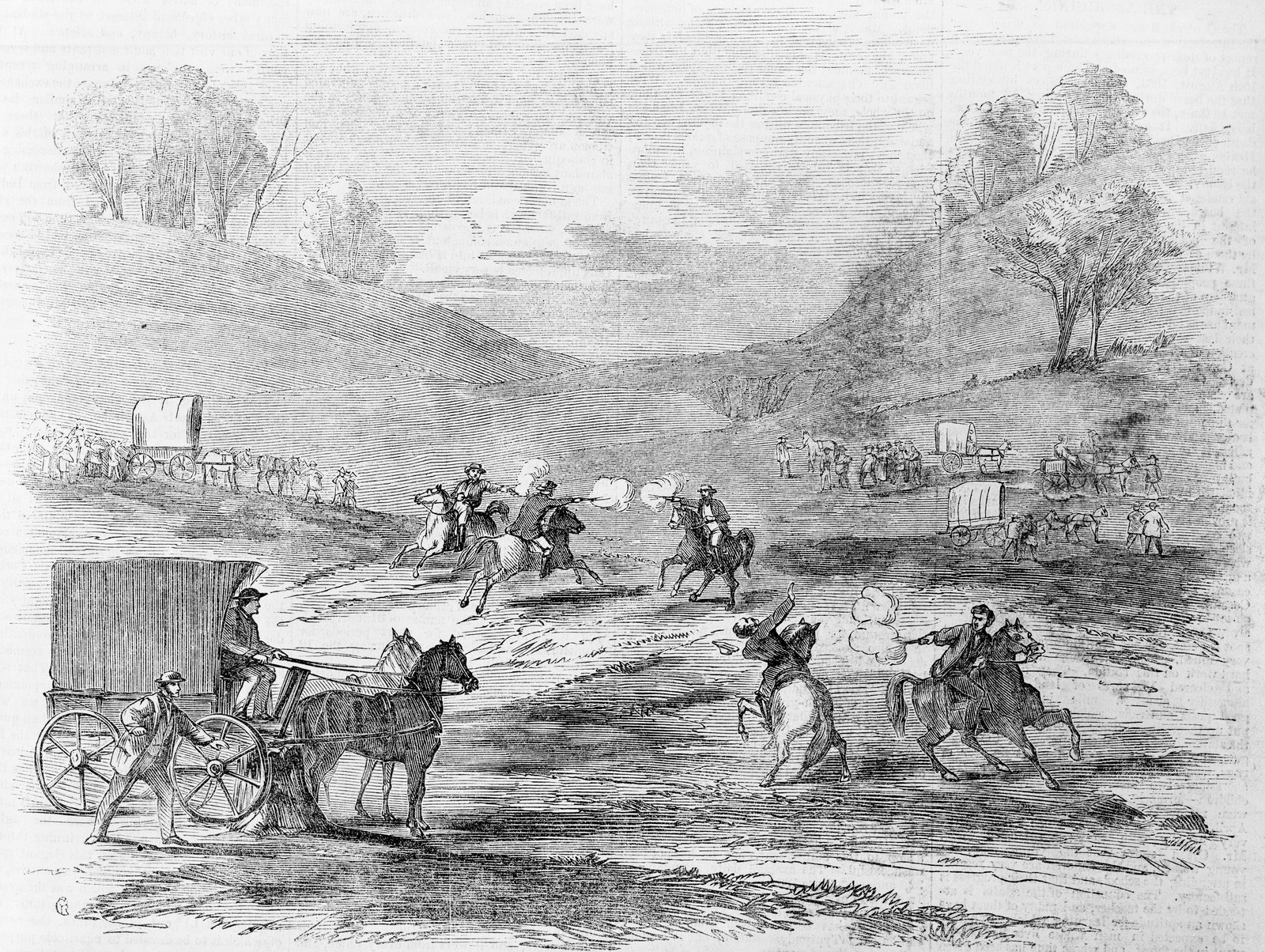
Shootout while bailing up the mail

- 15 November: The gang robbed the Gundagai Mail near Jugiong and Gilbert shot Sergeant Parry dead.
- 26 December: Hall, Gilbert, and Dunn bail up the town of Binda. Hall burned down Morriss’s store as an act of revenge after Morriss escaped and alerted police.

=== 1865 ===
- 26 January: Hall, Gilbert, and Dunn were at Collector, near Lake George. Dunn twice shot and killed the local police officer, Constable Samuel Nelson, the sole policeman in the township and father of eight children, while Hall and Gilbert were holding up the hotel. Dunn also shot at one of Nelson's sons but missed.

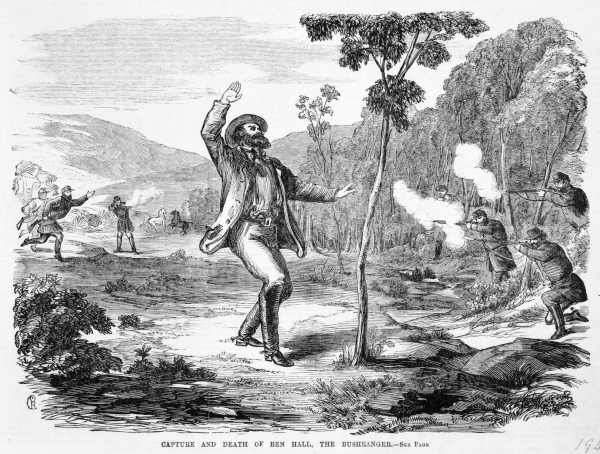
Death of Ben Hall

- 3 February: Robbed the Murrumbah Inn and the Ploughed Ground Inn at Paddys River.
- February: Shootout with four brothers of the Faithfull family; Gilbert's horse was killed, and the brothers were later awarded bravery medals by the New South Wales government.
- 6 February: Robbed the Braidwood mail coach south of Goulburn.
- 24 February: Shootout with police at Byrnes’ farm in Mutbilly.
- 4 March: Robbed the Gundaroo mail coach at Gearys Gap.
- 13 March: The gang attempted to rob the Araluen gold escort near Majors Creek.
- 17 March: The gang robbed Chinese miners at Little Wombat.
- 18 March: The gang exchanged shots with police at Wallendbeen; Gilbert was wounded in the arm.
- 25 March: Robbed Jones’s store at Forbes.
- 9 April: Robbed Brazier’s Inn at Nubryan.
- 10 April: Robbed Watts’s Inn, Austin’s inn, and Gallimore’s store at Black Rock.
- 21 April: The gang robbed Yamma Station.
- May: Hall, Gilbert, and Dunn were proclaimed outlaws. The Felons Apprehension Act was passed, which allowed known bushrangers to be shot and killed rather than taken to trial. This put the members of the gang outside the law and liable to be killed by anyone.
- 5 May: Hall had separated from the other two and later was surrounded by police and shot dead in the bush near Forbes.
- 12 May: Gilbert and Dunn, on hearing the news of Hall's death, headed for Dunn's grandfather's property at Murrumbarrah.

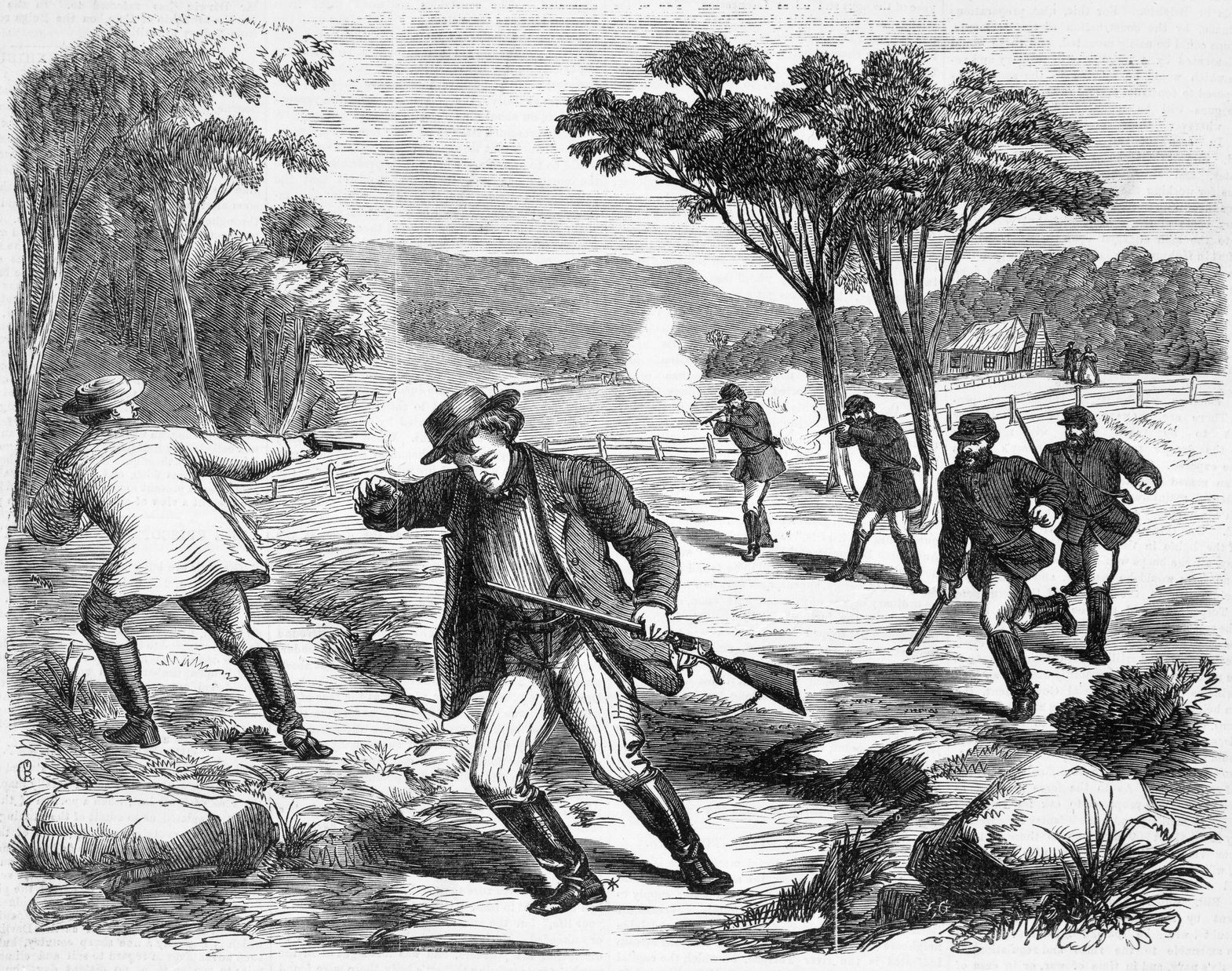
Gilbert shot dead by police

- 13 May: The Binalong Police Station Senior Constable Charles Hales thought they might visit John Kelly, Dunn's grandfather. On the morning of 13 May, John Kelly informed Senior Constable Hales that Gilbert and Dunn were at his hut. Hales gathered Constables John Bright, Michael King, and Henry Hall and headed to Kelly's place. Two parties were formed: Bright and Hall went to the back of the hut and were stationed in the creek, while Hales and King were stationed at the front of the hut.

As Hales and King approached the hut, the dogs started barking. Bushrangers ran out the back of the hut firing their guns, and kept up the fire as they got through a bush fence that led to the creek. They positioned themselves behind a large tree. Gilbert fired his revolving rifle at Hales and Bright, but it misfired. Meanwhile, King and Hall took up positions. Dunn and Gilbert started firing their revolvers at Hall and King and ran down to the creek. Hales and Bright immediately fired at the bushrangers; Gilbert was shot and died instantly.

Hales ordered his men to follow and to chase Dunn. The three constables chased Dunn for about a mile and a half; they were exhausted and had to give up the pursuit. Dunn stole a horse from nearby Bogolong station and wasn't heard from again for seven months.

- 18 December: Dunn was recognized by Police at McPhails Station near Walgett. A week later on 26 December, after a gunfight with police, he was wounded and captured near Coonamble. He was tried on 19 January 1866; the jury took ten minutes to find him guilty of murder, and he was sentenced to hang. He was hanged in Darlinghurst Gaol on 19 March 1866.

== Cultural depictions ==
During their heyday, the gang inspired many bush ballads, including "Streets of Forbes", about the death of Hall.

During Australia's first cinematic boom (1910–12), a series of films were made about the gang and its members, including The Life and Adventures of John Vane, the Notorious Australian Bushranger (1910), A Tale of the Australian Bush (1911), Bushranger's Ransom, or A Ride for Life (1911), Ben Hall and His Gang (1911) and Frank Gardiner, the King of the Road (1911).
