= John Foley (bushranger) =

Australian convict and bushranger

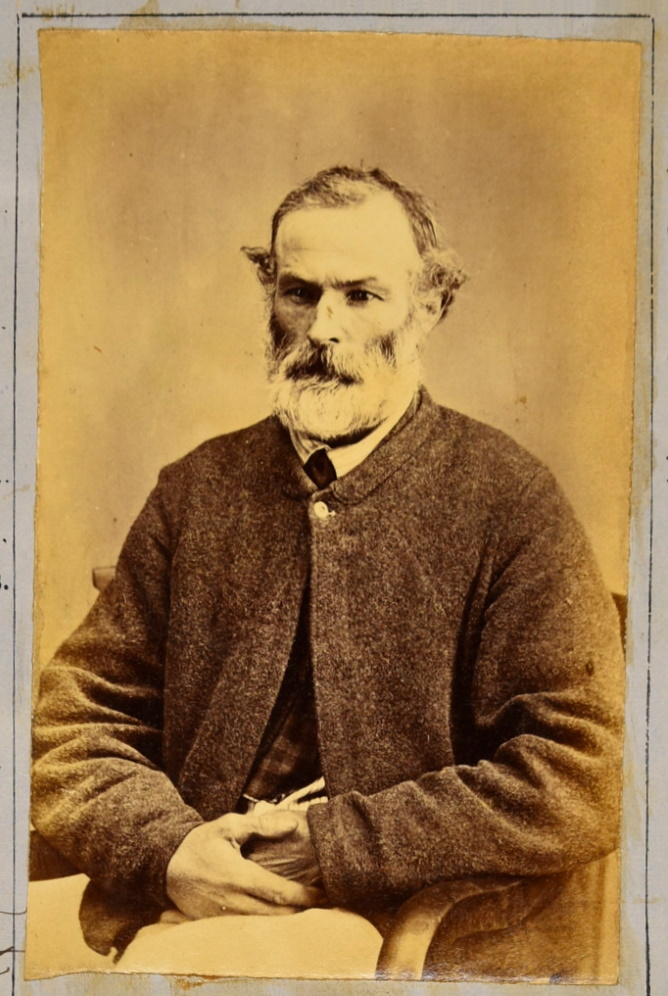
- John Foley, photographed in September 1873 (from his prison discharge file).
- Born: John Joseph Foley; 1833; Kelso, New South Wales, Australia
- Died: 26 February 1891 (aged 57–58); Near Swatchfield, Oberon district
- Resting place: Black Springs, New South Wales
- Occupation(s): Bushranger, farmer

John Foley (1833 – 26 February 1891) was a bushranger and associate of Fred Lowry. In July 1863 they robbed several mail coaches, including the Mudgee mail robbery which netted £5,700 in bank-notes. Foley was captured several weeks later with bank-notes from the Mudgee mail in his possession. He was tried at Bathurst and sentenced to fifteen-years hard labour. Foley was released in 1873; he settled in the Black Springs district near Oberon and led a respectable life until his death in 1891.

== Biography ==
=== Early life and family ===
John Joseph Foley was born at Kelso (near Bathurst) in 1833, the son of Laurence Foley and Mary (née Sullivan). He was third of eleven children, having seven brothers and three sisters.

Foley’s parents had both been transported from Ireland as convicts. They married at Campbelltown in June 1828 (five months after Mary Sullivan's arrival in Sydney). Soon afterwards, however, Laurence Foley was brought before the Campbelltown Bench of Magistrates “for harbouring Bushrangers & Robbers”; on 30 October 1828 he was sentenced to three years at the Moreton Bay penal settlement. Mary Foley relocated to the Oberon district soon afterwards, where the first of her children was born. Laurence Foley returned from Moreton Bay and received his Certificate of Freedom in August 1833. Laurence and Mary Foley's children were all born in the Oberon and Bathurst districts. By the 1840s the Foley family had settled at Wiseman’s Creek on the Campbell's River (north-west of Oberon).

As a young man John Foley was a skilled horse-rider and “was considered the ablest man in the saddle of his time”. It was recorded that Foley could "read and write well and work arithmetic".

=== Bushranging ===
On 13 February 1862 John Foley was charged with horse-stealing, and was allowed bail to appear at a later date. However, the charge was not proceeded with and after a fortnight Foley was discharged.

On Thursday, 31 July 1862, Ann Webb’s store at Mutton’s Falls on the Fish River was robbed by two men “with blackened faces”. They entered the premises and bailed up Mrs. Webb and her staff, eventually departing with £25 in cash and store merchandise to the value of about £70. John Foley was later indicted for this offence.

John Foley probably joined with Fred Lowry during 1862 (possibly as early as Webb's store robbery in July) and the two began committing robberies. Foley and Lowry were of a similar age. Lowry was a notorious horse-stealer who had been released after serving a prison sentence.

On Sunday, 14 September 1862, the mail contractor, William Weston, was stuck-up by two armed men at a location called the Black Swamp, two miles from Wilson’s inn between Cassilis and Mudgee. The bushrangers took the contractor’s horse, mail-bags and saddle-bags. The horse was later recovered with the empty mail-bags fastened to the saddle. The bushrangers had their faces covered with crêpe, though at one stage the fabric fell from the face of one man whom Weston was able to identify as Fred Lowry (alias Boyd). On 20 September 1862 Fred Lowry (alias Boyd) and two others stuck up Mr. Lawrence and his men at ‘Wilpingong’ station near Reedy Creek (north of Rylstone) and robbed them of £29 in notes, a cheque and “two silver hunting watches”.

On 2 October 1862 William Todd’s store on the Fish River was held up by armed men and robbed of cash totalling about £50 (the number of offenders was initially reported as two). The men had their faces covered, but it was suspected that "Thomas Foley" was one of them. It was later reported that a man named John Cosgrove had been apprehended by the Bathurst Police on suspicion of being one of the men who robbed the store. Cosgrove was a known criminal previously associated with the bushranger, John Peisley. A later account maintained that it was in fact four men that robbed Todd’s store and that two of the men had been apprehended (Cosgrove and one other). Of the two who had escaped, one was identified as Fred Lowry. The man initially identified as “Thomas Foley” was John Foley (later indicted for this offence).

On 9 November 1862 three armed men, with their faces blackened, robbed a number of Chinese miners at their camp in the upper Campbell’s River district. Foley’s younger brother Francis, then aged seventeen, was later convicted of being one of the men who carried out these robberies.

=== Race meeting shooting ===
A race meeting was held on New Year's Day 1863 at a race-course on Daniel McGuirk's land in the Brisbane Valley, south-west of Oberon near the Native Dog Creek diggings. Amongst those who attended were Fred Lowry and John Foley, described as “two men for whom the police have been some time on the look-out”. Towards evening after the races were concluded and the prize-money had been paid out, Lowry (by some accounts in a state of drunkenness) "attempted to bail up the persons present". Holding a revolver in each hand Lowry sought to drive a number of men towards the house. A man named Allen refused to move and Lowry struck him across the cheek with a revolver, which fired and struck a horse tethered nearby. At this a man named Patrick Foran came out of the house and rushed at Lowry, who fired again, hitting Foran in the chest. Despite his wound Foran held on to Lowry until others intervened and the assailant was secured. Lowry was conveyed under heavy guard to Bathurst gaol. The accounts of the events make no mention of John Foley after the shooting; it is assumed he made his departure when his companion was apprehended. A newspaper report of Lowry's capture made the following comments: “There are several charges of robbery against him, and his apprehension will be a source of gratification to the inhabitants of the district, to whom he has long been a terror and a pest”.

=== Goulburn mail robbery ===
Fred Lowry accomplished a sensational escape from Bathurst Gaol in mid-February 1863 and for several months rode with members of the Gardiner-Hall gang, a loosely-formed group of bushrangers notorious for having robbed the Lachlan Gold Escort near Eugowra in mid-1862. By the end of June, however, Lowry had again joined up with John Foley.

On the early afternoon of 3 July 1863 Cobb and Co.’s coach was bailed up by two armed men within a quarter of an hour of its departure from Goulburn, still within sight of the township and less than a mile from the police barracks. The incident was described as “the coolest case of bushranging perhaps ever recorded”. The coach was carrying mail for Sydney. The contents of the mail-bags were ransacked and one of the three passengers, Mr. Copeland, was robbed of £15 and his watch. While the robbery was in progress two men rode up, unaware of what was happening until too late when the pair were forced to dismount at gunpoint. One of the men, Captain Morphy, was robbed of a gold watch and chain. Other passers-by were also stopped and robbed by the bushrangers. One traveller who was stopped, Mr. March of Jerrara, remonstrated with the bushrangers, telling them “he had just buried two sons, and needed the money more than they”, in response to which the outlaws returned his money to him. After they had finished examining the mailbags the bushrangers rode off towards the Cookbundoon range (north-east of the township).

Even though the bushrangers who held up the Goulburn mail did not attempt to disguise themselves, their identity was not immediately established. The correspondent to the Sydney Mail newspaper speculated that they belonged “to the Abercrombie or Bathurst side”. After Fred Lowry was fatally wounded two months later the gold watch he had stolen from Captain Morphy was found in his possession and three witnesses, including Morphy and the driver of the coach, Michael Curran, positively identified the deceased Lowry as one of the two bushrangers who had robbed the coach outside of Goulburn. Lowry's companion was almost certainly John Foley; the two of them were later proven to have held up the Mudgee mail, just ten days after the Goulburn mail robbery.

=== Mudgee mail robbery ===
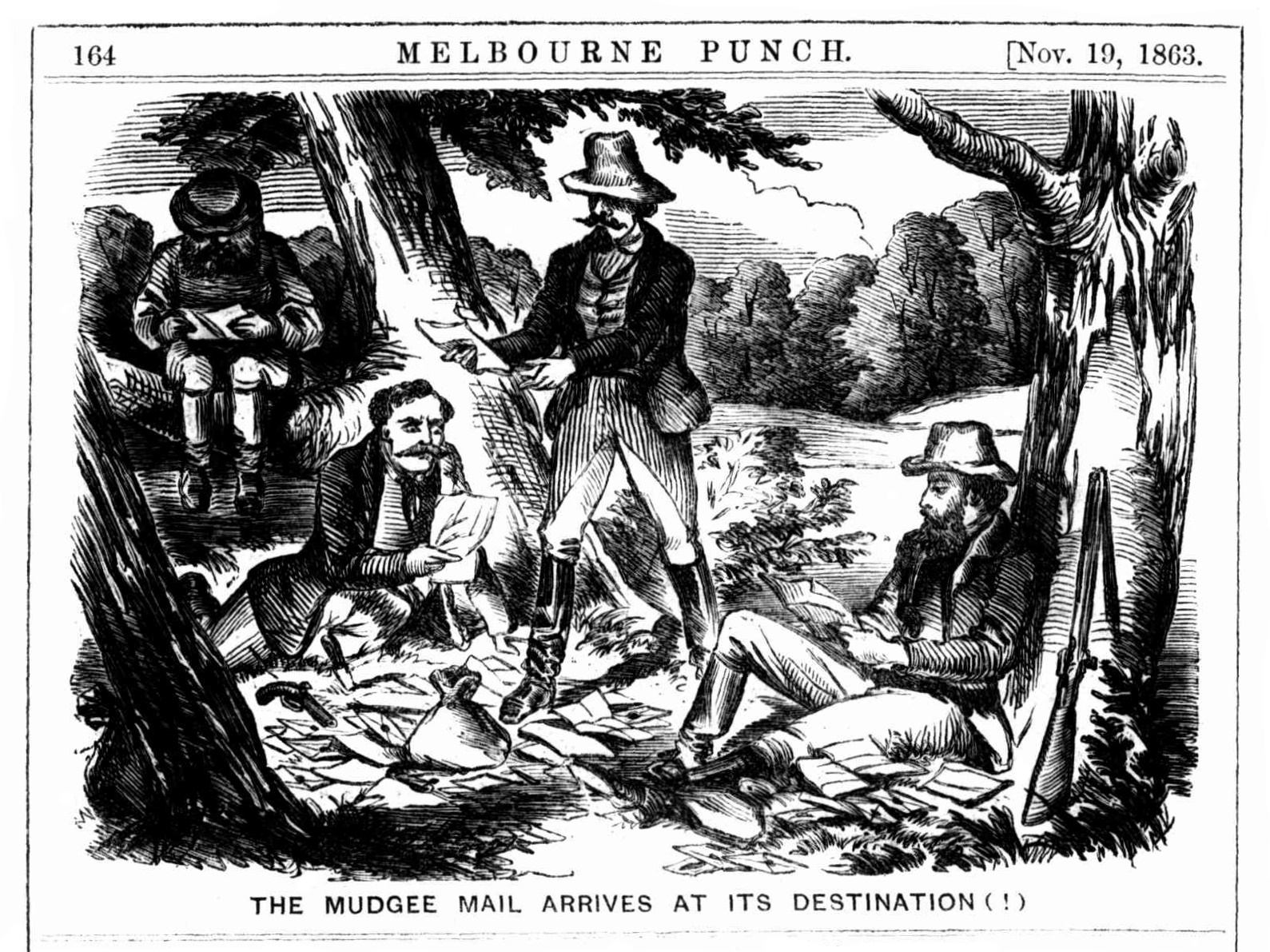
’The Mudgee mail arrives at its destination (!)’, a satirical response to the lucrative mail-coach robbery by Lowry and Foley (Melbourne Punch, November 1863).

Late in the morning of Monday, 13 July 1863, Cobb and Co.’s Mudgee mail coach was held up by two bushrangers. The coach had left Mudgee the previous evening with one passenger, Henry Kater, the accountant of the Mudgee branch of the Australian Joint Stock Bank. Kater had charge of a parcel of bank-notes amounting to £5,700. Along the way the coach picked up another passenger, Mrs. Smith, the wife of an inn-keeper at Ben Bullen. At the time of the robbery the coach was ascending the steep rise known as ‘Big Hill’, sixteen miles from Bowenfels. Two men on horseback came down the hill and bailed up the coach-driver and Kater, who was walking alongside the coach because of the steep incline. The coach-driver was ordered to drive into the bush.

When they were off the road the accountant, Kater, was robbed of a revolver and a gold watch and chain. The mail-bags were taken down from the box and the letters opened, looking for cash and valuables. When the parcel of bank-notes was discovered Kater told them the notes would be useless, as they were old and were being taken to Sydney to be destroyed, to which one of them responded, “Never mind, we can make a bonfire of them”. Before they left the robbers told the coachman to unharness the horses, who were then driven into the bush as the bushrangers departed.

After the bushrangers had left Henry Kater and the coach-driver, William Tinker, went to try and catch the horses, but without success. When they returned Mrs. Smith told them she had seen “a third man follow in the direction the bushrangers had taken”. The third man was Larry Cummins, who probably had the role of keeping watch on the road during the robbery by Lowry and Foley. Kater eventually made his way to Hartley and reported the robbery, after which four mounted police set off to search for the offenders.

The identity of the Mudgee mail bushrangers was not determined immediately. Soon afterwards the police arrested three suspects, but when the coach-driver and passengers gave evidence they did not recognise them as the men who robbed the coach, they were discharged. Eventually it was determined that two of the offenders were the wanted men, Frederick Lowry and John Foley (both of whom were later found with bank-notes from the robbery in their possession). The full list of issuing banks and serial numbers of the stolen bank-notes was published (taking up nearly three entire newspaper columns), together with an offer of a £500 reward from the bank, to anyone “who will give such information a will lead to the conviction of the offenders, or the recovery of the said notes”.

On 3 August 1863 seventeen residents of the Fish River district signed a letter sent to their local parliamentary representative, William Cummings, the member for East Macquarie in the New South Wales Legislative Assembly. The letter pointed out that “not a single policeman” was stationed along the road from Hartley to Goulburn and that the perpetrators of the two recent robberies (the Goulburn and Mudgee mail coaches) “in each instance took this road”. The letter also claimed that John Foley and Fred Lowry (described as “a most notorious nest of Highway Robbers”) were “living publicly on this road having recently built stabling, house, etc. upon Government Ground”. The letter concluded that the road “seems to be a kind of back door for the escape of any scoundrel that thinks proper to turn Highwayman”.

On 8 August 1863 Senior-sergeant Waters was involved in searching a house in Durham-street, Bathurst, occupied by John Foley’s parents. During the search the policeman noticed “Mrs. Foley in the act of secreting something”. He demanded to see what it was, and established it to be one of the banknotes stolen from the Mudgee mail.

=== Capture ===
On Sunday, 9 August 1863, three constables named Edward MacDonald, James Lee and Henry Nichols, and a black tracker named Georgie Miranda, arrived at Jack Mackey’s public-house at Campbell’s River. The constables were in disguise, looking “more like diggers than policemen”. They asked the landlord if any strangers were there. Mackey said he had been out all morning looking for some sheep, but had no objection if they wished to search the premises. Constable MacDonald tried to open a bedroom door, and found there was a man on the other side with his shoulder pushing against the door. MacDonald called upon the man to admit him, to no avail, so he directed another constable to take up position at the window of the room. The policeman pushed against the door again, and thrust his pistol through the opening and fired. At this the man gave up his resolve and allowed MacDonald to enter, who called on the man to surrender (who turned out to be John Foley). In the room the constable found two revolvers, both of them capped and loaded, and £60 in notes in a pocket-book (a number of them stolen from the Mudgee mail robbery). Foley was handcuffed and the bushranger and his captors returned to Bathurst.

On Friday, 21 August 1863, John Foley appeared before the Bathurst Police Court, charged with robbing the Mudgee mail. Depositions were taken regarding the circumstances of the robbery and identification of the prisoner. The coach-driver, William Tinker, said he had “very little doubt” the prisoner was one of those who had stuck them up, “though at that time he had more beard than now”. It was later revealed that Foley’s whiskers had been shaved off by the barber at Bathurst Gaol (despite instructions not to shave anyone who was awaiting trial). The Police Magistrate then ordered that the barber be immediately confined to a cell. At the conclusion of the hearing Foley was remanded in custody. A week later he was brought before the Bathurst Police Court again where Henry Kater produced the original manuscript list of the bank-notes stolen from the Mudgee mail. It was ascertained that the all the notes found on the prisoner, with the exception of two, corresponded with those on the list. Foley was committed to take his trial at the next circuit court.

While Foley was waiting to be tried, his former associate, Fred Lowry, died after being severely wounded in a violent confrontation with the police.

=== Foley family trials ===
On Monday, 7 September 1863, John Foley was placed in the dock of the Bathurst Circuit Court before Justice Wise, charged with robbery of the Mudgee mail. He was undefended at the trial. Two of the three constables who had captured Foley gave evidence, as well as the driver of the Mudgee mail coach, William Tinker, and the passenger, Henry Kater. The jury “almost immediately returned a verdict of guilty”. In summing up, the Justice Wise observed that “it was really lamentable that a young man in the possession of youth and vigour should have reached that depth of moral degradation”. He expressed the hope that the fate of the prisoner would serve as a warning to those “whose sympathies were with him – persons who would be ready to harbour and screen him from the just punishment of his guilt”. Foley was sentenced to fifteen years’ hard labour on the roads, the first three years in irons.

On the day following John Foley's trial the same judge tried his younger brother Francis Foley. The young man had first appeared at the Bathurst Circuit Court in March 1863, indicted on a charge relating to the raid on the Chinese miners’ camp at Campbell’s River by three armed men in November 1862. Francis had been initially charged with the armed robbery of Sam Chung, but was acquitted of the charges. He was then indicted on additional charges alleged to have occurred on the same day and place, for which he was remanded in custody until the next court sessions. When Francis Foley appeared in court on Tuesday, September 8, he was charged with having on 9 November 1862, in company with two unknown persons, assaulted Ah Chi and Ah Sam at Campbell’s River and stolen from them one ounce of gold and a small amount of cash.

During the examination of the first defence witness at Francis Foley’s trial, the prisoner’s mother was observed going in and out of the courtroom on several occasions and entering into conversations with the waiting witnesses. Mrs. Foley was brought before the judge and reprimanded. Each of the subsequent defence witnesses were “severely cross-examined as to the nature of the remarks made to them by the woman, but nothing was elicited”. The defence were attempting to establish an alibi for Francis, with their witnesses consisting of four members of the prisoner’s family, and an old man named Shee “who had been on terms of intimacy with them for a number of years”. In regard to their testimonies, the newspaper report commented, “it has seldom been our lot to witness such an exhibition of prevarication and lying as was shown in their conflicting statements”. Francis Foley was found guilty and sentenced to ten years on the roads, the first year in irons. After the trial had concluded Justice Wise had all the defence witnesses brought before him. He committed Thomas Foley, the prisoner’s twin brother, for contempt of court and sentenced him to one weeks’ imprisonment. The old man Shee was called, but “it was found he had contrived to slink off”. The other witnesses, Foley’s father and two sisters, “were cautioned and allowed to depart”.

John Foley was from a Catholic family and during his incarceration at Bathurst, prior to being transferred to Cockatoo Island, he was visited on several occasions by Father Timothy McCarthy, based at nearby Carcoar. The visits appear to have had a morally uplifting effect on the prisoner. Before he was transferred, Foley revealed to the Bathurst Police Magistrate and Father McCarthy where bank-notes stolen from the Mudgee mail amounting to £2,700 were concealed. The bank-notes were recovered and handed back to the Australian Joint Stock Bank. McCarthy later claimed that "no special religious influence was brought to bear" upon Foley, that his action in revealing where the money was hidden was actuated by Foley’s own "moral motives".

=== Prison ===
Both John and Francis Foley were initially sent to Cockatoo Island. In November 1863 John Foley was transferred to Parramatta Gaol in order to separate him from his brother. John’s conduct during the two years and four months he spent at Parramatta Gaol was summarised in his prison record as “bad”. In late-December 1863, as punishment for “insubordinate conduct” (that included destruction of Government property), he was confined to his cell for seven days followed by two months of “separate treatment” (solitary confinement). In February 1864 he was confined to his cell for 24 hours. In June 1865, in punishment for an escape attempt and the assault of officers, he received 25 lashes and a period (unspecified) of solitary confinement.

On 28 February 1866 John Foley was transferred to Darlinghurst Gaol where his conduct dramatically changed, which soon afterwards was described as “orderly, industrious and attentive in school”. John Foley served ten years of his fifteen-year sentence. He was discharged from prison on 6 September 1873.

=== Later life ===
When he was released from prison in September 1873, John Foley settled down to a respectable life, becoming a farmer near Black Springs, in the Campbell's River district. In 1877 Foley married Bridget Behan, from an established family in the district. The couple had seven children, born between 1878 and 1889. John and Bridget Foley lived at a property called 'Green-mount' in the Black Springs district, with Foley described as a farmer and grazier. A school was opened in 1881 at Swatchfield (about five miles from Black Springs), brought about by an application from local residents Alfred Stevenson, James Hanrahan and John Foley.

John Foley died on 26 February 1891, aged 58 years; he was "returning from a bazaar at Swatchfield" when he "died suddenly from heart disease". He was buried in Black Springs Cemetery. Foley died without having made a will and administration of his estate was granted to his widow. Bridget Foley died in May 1934 and was buried at Black Springs.

== See also ==
- Fred Lowry (bushranger)
- Larry Cummins (bushranger)
