= Larry Cummins (bushranger) =

Australian bushranger (1843–1909)

Lawrence 'Larry' Cummins
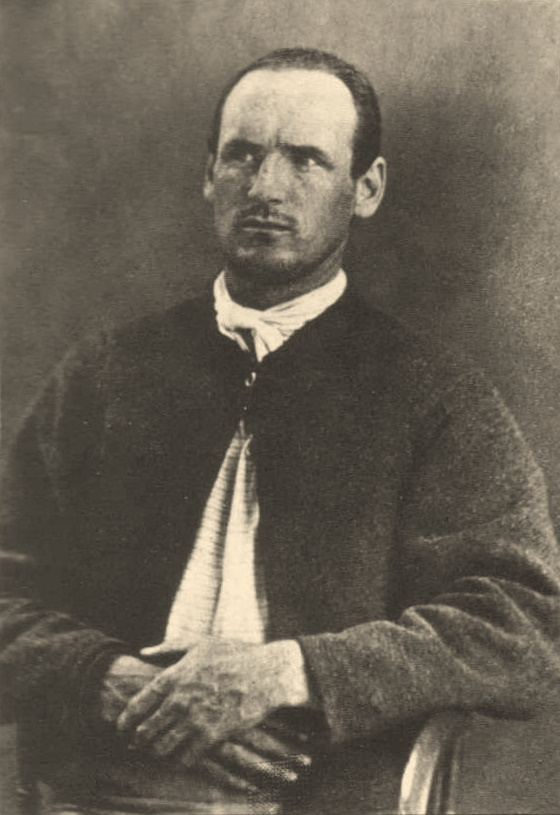
- Larry Cummins (1843 - 1909).
- Born: Lawrence Cummins; 1843; Yalbraith, New South Wales, Australia
- Died: 19 October 1909 (aged 65–66); Wodonga, Victoria, Australia
- Other name: James Long

Lawrence Cummins (1843 – 1909), known informally as Larry Cummins, was a bushranger who operated primarily in the districts surrounding the Abercrombie River (in the central west of New South Wales between Bathurst and Goulburn). In July 1863 he participated in the Mudgee mail robbery led by Fred Lowry and John Foley. Soon afterwards Cummins and his younger brother John carried out several robberies. They were identified and John Cummins was apprehended; he was accidentally shot and killed while being escorted by police constables (probably by Larry Cummins in an abortive attempt to free his brother). Three weeks later Cummins was captured with his associate Lowry, in an encounter with the police which resulted in Lowry’s death. Cummins was sent to Berrima Gaol in late 1863, from where he escaped in November 1866 with another prisoner. From December 1866 to April 1867 Cummins carried out a series of audacious robberies. In April, during an attempted robbery of Webb's store on the Fish River in company with John Foran, he received a wound in the face from birdshot. He was captured soon afterwards and sentenced to thirty years hard labour and sent back to Berrima Gaol.

Cummins was released from prison in January 1876 after his sentence was controversially reduced by the Robertson government (with the official sanction of the colonial Governor). After his release Cummins left the colony and lived in Victoria using the name 'James Long', where he married and had a family. Lawrence Cummins (as James Long) died at Wodonga in October 1909.

== Biography ==
=== Early life ===
Lawrence Cummins was born on 12 June 1843 at Yalbraith, eight miles north-west of Taralga in the Goulburn district, the son of Joseph Cummins and Mary (née Ryan). His parents were both from county Tipperary in Ireland; they were married in 1838 at Holycross. Joseph and Mary Cummins emigrated to Australia aboard the Portland, arriving at Sydney in March 1841. They were living at Cobbitty near Camden soon afterwards and by 1843, when Lawrence was born, the family had settled at Yalbraith.

Lawrence was the second eldest child of the family, having three brothers and five younger sisters.

Lawrence Cummins married Bridget Francis in October 1861. Cummins was aged eighteen and Bridget was fifteen when they married. Bridget Francis was from an established family in the Abercrombie River district, north of Crookwell. By the time of her marriage in 1861 both of Bridget’s parents had died. Larry's father, Joseph Cummins, died in October 1862. The couple’s first child was born in December 1862 on the Bolong River (which flows north into the Abercrombie River).

=== Mudgee mail robbery ===
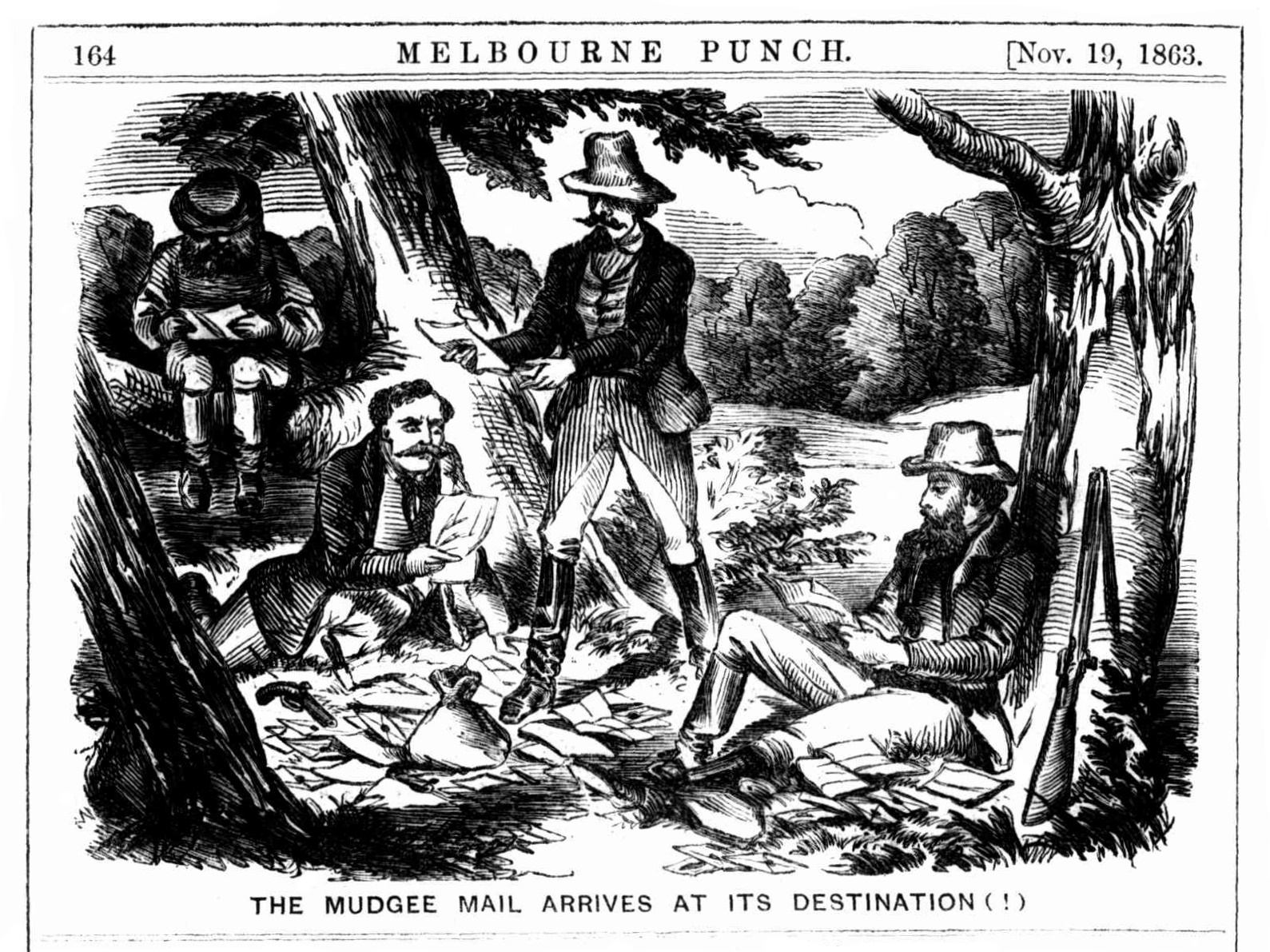
’The Mudgee mail arrives at its destination (!)’, a satirical response to the lucrative mail-coach robbery (Melbourne Punch, November 1863).

By July 1863 Cummins had joined up with the bushrangers Fred Lowry and John Foley. Late in the morning of Monday, 13 July 1863, Cobb and Co.’s Mudgee mail coach was held up by Fred Lowry and John Foley. Larry Cummins was also involved, though not directly; he probably had the role of keeping watch on the road during the robbery. The coach had left Mudgee the previous evening with one passenger, Henry Kater, the accountant of the Mudgee branch of the Australian Joint Stock Bank. Kater had charge of a parcel of bank-notes amounting to £5,700. Along the way the coach picked up another passenger, Mrs. Smith, the wife of an inn-keeper at Ben Bullen. At the time of the robbery the coach was ascending the steep rise known as ‘Big Hill’, sixteen miles from Bowenfels. Lowry and Foley came down the hill on horseback and bailed up the coach-driver and Kater, who was walking alongside the coach because of the steep incline. The coach-driver was ordered to drive into the bush. When they were off the road the accountant, Kater, was robbed of a revolver and a gold watch and chain. The mail-bags were taken down from the box and the letters opened, looking for cash and valuables. When the parcel of bank-notes was discovered Kater told them the notes would be useless, as they were old and were being taken to Sydney to be destroyed, to which one of them responded, "Never mind, we can make a bonfire of them". Before they left the robbers told the coachman to unharness the horses, who were then driven into the bush as the bushrangers departed.

After the bushrangers had left Henry Kater and the coach-driver, William Tinker, went to try and catch the horses, but without success. When they returned Mrs. Smith told them she had seen "a third man follow in the direction the bushrangers had taken". Kater eventually made his way to Hartley and reported the robbery, after which four mounted police set off to search for the offenders.

The identity of the Mudgee mail bushrangers was not determined immediately. Soon afterwards the police arrested three suspects, but when the coach-driver and passengers gave evidence they did not recognise them as the men who robbed the coach, they were discharged. Eventually it was determined that two of the offenders were the wanted men, Frederick Lowry and John Foley (both of whom were later found with bank-notes from the robbery in their possession). Cummins' role in the robbery was determined after his later capture in the company of Lowry. The full list of issuing banks and serial numbers of the stolen bank-notes was published (taking up nearly three entire newspaper columns), together with an offer of a £500 reward from the bank, to anyone "who will give such information a will lead to the conviction of the offenders, or the recovery of the said notes".

=== The shooting of John Cummins ===
On 26 July 1863 just after sundown, Larry Cummins and his younger brother John (aged eighteen) arrived at Norman McKinnon’s farm at Richlands (six miles north of Taralga). With their faces blackened they rode up to the house, dismounted and, each presenting a pistol, ordered McKinnon and his brother to "bail up". With no money in the house the brothers took possession of a whip, bridle, a pair of saddle-bags and a girth-strap before departing.

On Thursday morning, 6 August 1863, two policemen, Senior-constable Murphy and Constable Molloy, went to the hut of Mrs. Cummins at Menangle Creek, near Bolong in the Crookwell district, in search of her two sons, Larry and John Cummins, who were suspected of having robbed dwellings near Taralga (including McKinnon's farmhouse at Richlands). While searching the farm buildings they found John Cummins hiding in the loft. Murphy was in the process of ascending to the loft in order to apprehend him when Cummins fired twice at the constables. The policemen took cover and returned fire, after which the young man surrendered. The police saddled one of the family’s horses for Cummins and proceeded towards Binda, Murphy leading the prisoner’s horse and Molloy a few yards in the rear. When they had covered about eight miles a gunshot was suddenly fired from the bush beside the roadside, which hit the back of Cummins’ head behind his ear. John Cummins fell forward, "gave one groan" and died. The policemen did not see the shooter but heard the sound of a horse galloping away. It was assumed that the shot was intended for Constable Murphy, who was abreast of the prisoner (on the opposite side from where the shot came). It was speculated that the person who fired the shot was the dead man’s elder brother, Lawrence Cummins.

=== Captured with Lowry ===
Early on Saturday morning, 29 August 1863, four policemen arrived at Thomas Vardy’s public-house (the Limerick Races Inn) at Cook’s Vale Creek, about 20 miles north of Crookwell. They had arrived as a result of information received and strongly suspected that Frederick Lowry was present within Vardy’s public-house. Senior-sergeant Stephenson positioned Constable Herbst and Detective Camphin at the rear and front of the house before he and Detective Sanderson rode up, dismounted and went into the bar. Stephenson asked the publican if he had any strangers in the house, to which Vardy answered "yes" and nodded his head towards the room they were in. Stephenson went to the parlour-door leading to the room and, finding it locked, he "knocked and asked for admittance". Receiving no reply, the policeman declared that if the door was not opened, he would break it open. A shot was then fired from inside which went through the door and wounded Stephenson’s horse tethered outside. Stephenson went outside and moved his horse; as he returned to the house, the parlour-door suddenly opened and Fred Lowry emerged with a revolver in each hand, calling out "I’m Lowry; come on ye b------s, and I’ll fight ye fair". Standing about five yards apart the two men exchanged gunshots, resulting in the bushranger receiving a wound in the throat. Sanderson assisted in dragging the bushranger into the yard where he was handcuffed and subdued.

Leaving Sanderson in charge of the prisoner Stephenson and Detective Camphin proceeded to the room in which Lowry had stayed, where they found Larry Cummins in bed (but wearing his shirt and trousers). There was a revolver on the washstand, capped and loaded and within reach of the bed. Cummins was brought to the yard and handcuffed. A search of the room revealed £164 in notes later identified as being stolen from the Mudgee mail in mid-July. Senior-sergeant Stephenson also arrested the publican, Thomas Vardy, his two step-sons and three others who were on the premises, all of them later charged with "harbouring bushrangers and with being accessory to robberies after the fact".

The policemen secured horses and a dray to convey the severely wounded Lowry to Goulburn. They arrived at Woodhouselee on nightfall, sixteen miles from their destination. Having determined the dray-horses would not reach Goulburn, Stephenson decided to stop at Pratton’s public-house and despatched a messenger to Goulburn for a doctor. Lowry died at about six o’clock on Sunday morning, 30 August. The policemen, with Lowry's body and Cummins in handcuffs, travelled to Goulburn later that morning.

=== Armed robbery conviction ===
At Goulburn Larry Cummins was remanded in custody on charges of armed robbery and the murder of his brother. On Monday evening, 7 September 1863, a public meeting was held in the Mechanics’ Institute in Goulburn for the intention of initiating the presentation of a testimonial to Sub-inspector Stephenson (recently promoted) and his men, "for their courageous conduct in the capture of the bushrangers Lowry and Cummins". One speaker called attention to "the courage displayed by Mr. Stephenson" when, after capturing Lowry, "he proceeded to apprehend Cummins, a man looked upon as even more desperate, and as a perfect fiend".

Lawrence Cummins was brought before the Goulburn Police Court on 9 September 1863 and charged with the murder of his brother. He was remanded in custody "for the production of further evidence". On 14 September Cummins was brought before the Police Magistrate on charges of robbing the huts of Norman McKinnon and Alexander McKenzie near Richlands. The prisoner was positively identified and committed to stand trial on both charges. A further witness was also examined in regard to the charge of murdering his brother. It was later determined there was insufficient evidence to proceed with the indictment for murder and this charge was dismissed.

On Thursday, 24 September 1863, at the Goulburn Assizes Lawrence Cummins was charged with having committed armed robbery and assault of Norman McKinnon at Richlands on 26 July. Cummins pleaded not guilty. McKinnon gave his account of the robbery and Senior-sergeant Stephenson outlined the circumstances leading to Cummins’ arrest. After the judge had summed up, the jury retired for about an hour and returned a verdict of guilty. On the following day Cummins was brought before the court again and sentenced to "be kept to hard labour on the roads or other public works for fifteen years, the first year in irons". Cummins was sent to Berrima Gaol, where he remained for about three years. During much of this time substantial additions and extension of the prison walls were carried out at Berrima Gaol.

=== Escape and return to bushranging ===
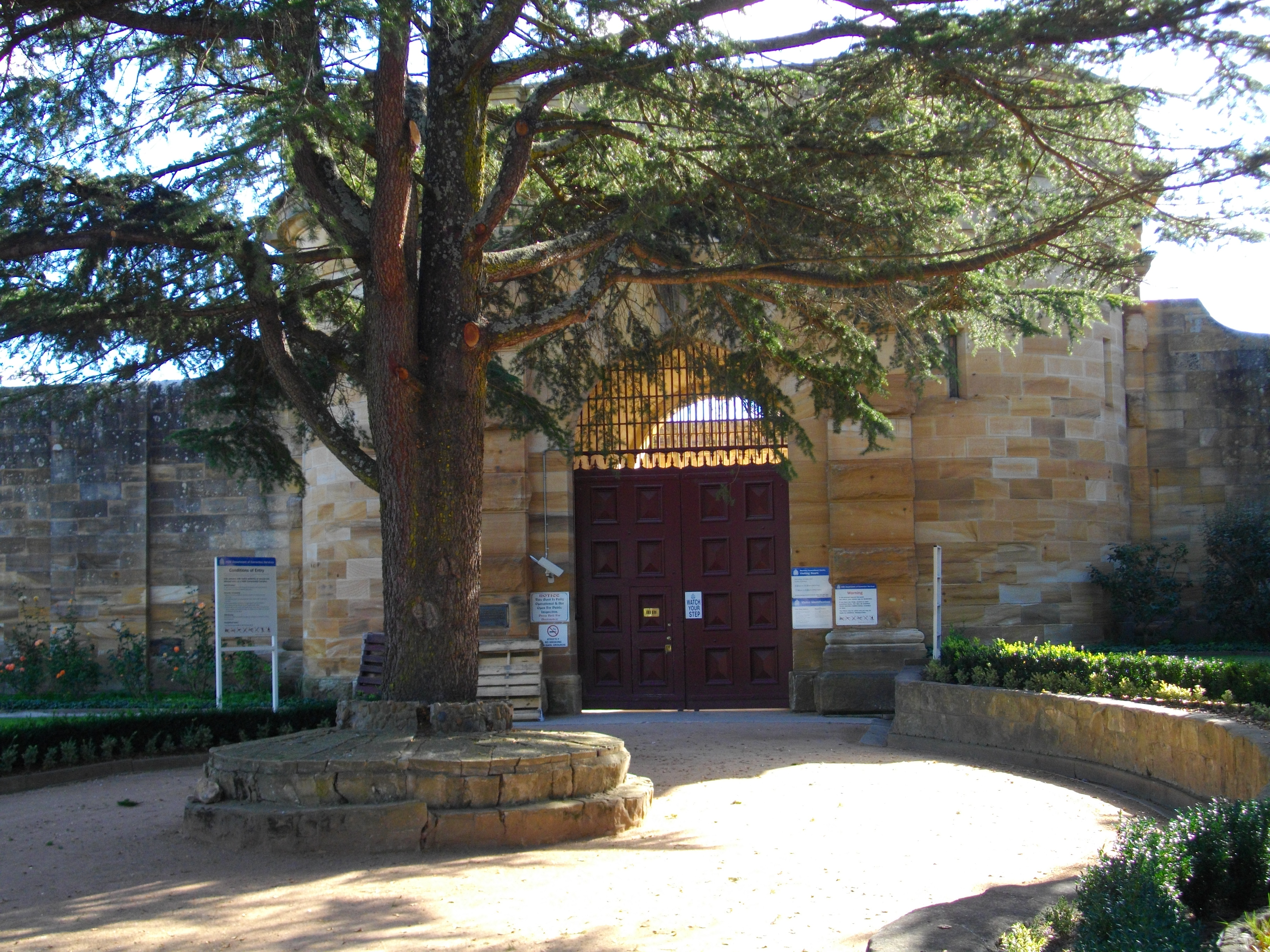
The entrance to Berrima Gaol, part of the extensive prison re-build and expansion completed in 1866.

Late-morning on 27 November 1866, Larry Cummins and another prisoner at Berrima Gaol, John Southgate, escaped by crawling through the main sewer outlet from the gaol. One of the prison drains had been opened, and was undergoing the process of being cleaned out. Cummins’ duty at the prison was as a wood-cutter in a part of the gaol-yard away from the opened drain, but during the morning he was found to be missing by the warder on duty. A muster-roll was called and the other prisoner, Southgate, was also found to be missing. Southgate had been working as a wardsman in one of the prison wings. The prisoners crawled through one hundred and twenty yards of the sewer (described as "a tube of muck and filth") which drained towards the Wingecarribee River. About twenty yards from the river they made a breach in the sewer where the covering was close to the surface. When the breakout was discovered parties of police and volunteers went in pursuit of the escapees, but without success.

On Thursday afternoon, 6 December 1866, two men arrived at Henderson’s house at ‘Rosslyn’, in the Cotta Walla district near Crookwell. They were described as being "very badly mounted and wearing clothes that did not at all fit them". The men, reported to be the escaped prisoners, Cummins and Southgate, rounded up the men working in the fields at gunpoint and ordered them up to the house. They then selected a number of articles: two saddles and bridles, a double-barrelled gun, a silver watch, tea and sugar and other foodstuffs, and a large amount of clothing (including women’s and children’s). Two of the best horses on the farm were then selected, which were laden with the stolen property, and the two men then departed. During the whole time it was noted the bushrangers "appeared very nervous, and would not allow anyone to come within ten yards of them". After they had gone several of the Henderson family rode to Goulburn to report the crime. The police declined to go out at once, but stated they would be at ‘Rosslyn’ early the next morning. However, four days after the robbery the police had not yet appeared at the farm.

On Tuesday, 11 December 1866, a carrier named George Writer was riding on horseback near Cook’s Vale Creek (north of Crookwell) when he came across the camp of three men. They made an attempt to bail him up, but the carrier galloped away and was fired upon by the bushrangers. The men were believed to be the escaped prisoners Cummins and Southgate, as well as "a new recruit". On Monday evening, 24 December, the bushrangers Cummins and Southgate held up Hadfield’s store at Binda, and stole bank-notes, cheques and goods to a value of more than £40.

In January 1867 the fellow-escapees Cummins and Southgate went their separate ways. In late-January John Southgate was captured by the police near Cowra. He was brought to Bathurst Gaol where his identity was established. It was reported he was "recognised as one of the ten men who were sticking up in this neighbourhood a week or so ago". It is conceivable that Cummins visited his wife in the Abercrombie River district during his period of freedom after November 1866. During 1867 Bridget Cummins gave birth to her second child, a daughter named Catherine.

On 31 January 1867 Oliver Sleeman was robbed on the Carcoar Road by four armed men. That evening Sleeman arrived at William Whittaker’s Half-way House on the Carcoar Road, to find the inn being held up by the same four bushrangers. The four were later identified as Larry Cummins, James ('Big Jim') Kelly and the brothers Patrick and John Foran. The outlaws had about forty people bailed up inside the public-house, and stole about £100 in bank-notes, £10 in silver and 30 ounces of gold, as well as a number of bottles of spirits. Kelly and Paddy Foran were recognised and later apprehended for the robbery at Whittaker's public-house and convicted in April 1867. When Cummins was later charged with this offence he claimed that Kelly and Patrick Foran, previously convicted of the same crime, "were perfectly innocent".

On Sunday, 17 February 1867, "two men and a lad", each of them armed with revolvers, called at Daniel O’Brien’s inn at Laggan (north-east of Crookwell) and bailed up those present. The three bushrangers were Larry Cummins, a young man named William Johnson and a youth called ‘Jim’. They demanded money, but not finding any, threatened to burn down the hotel. In the end they stole two of O’Brien’s horses and a quantity of brandy. From there the bushrangers headed east towards Taralga. The following morning a report reached the Taralga township that the bushrangers were at McAlister’s public-house at Strathaird, five miles to the south on the Goulburn road. Cummins and his companions ate breakfast and drank some grog at the inn, and then "went off without paying". At Taralga, as soon as word reached them constables Wiles and Chalker mounted their horses and rode towards Strathaird. When the policemen arrived Cummins and his mates had already left, heading south. After about five miles further on the policemen caught up with the three riders. When they sighted them, Wiles and Chalker separated, one taking to the bush at the side of the road and the other keeping to the road. Drawing near, they called on the bushrangers to surrender, but received a volley of gun-fire in response. The policemen returned fire, and during the gunfight the young lad Jim cried out "I’m shot". At this the other two bushrangers, Cummins and Johnson, galloped away in opposite directions, closely followed by the constables, Chalker after Johnson and Wiles after Cummins. Chalker knew his horse was nearly winded, so he aimed a shot at the bushranger’s horse, hitting it in the shoulder and both horse and rider went to the ground. Johnson escaped through the fence beside the road and started running across the paddock; Chalker dismounted, went through the fence and gave chase. With the policeman gaining on him Johnson surrendered. Meanwhile, Constable Wiles had noticed Chalker’s horse cantering without a rider; he gave up the chase and returned to where his colleague was holding Johnson captive. Cummins and Jim made their escape, the latter apparently not that badly wounded.

On Thursday, 14 March 1867, John Burke, the mailman between Bathurst and Bullock Flat, was held up by Larry Cummins in the vicinity of Mutton Falls (16 miles north of Oberon on the Fish River). Cummins was on horseback, brandishing a revolver; he ordered Burke off the road and transferred the mailman’s saddle and the mailbags to his own horse, before riding away.

=== With John Foran ===
Early on Monday morning, 4 April 1867, William Todd’s store at Stoney Creek near the Campbell’s River was robbed of money by two armed men, the escaped bushranger Larry Cummins and a younger man, John Foran (who had been part of the gang who bailed up Whittaker's inn with Cummins and two others in late-January). John Foran was recognised by the storekeeper as being from a family long-settled in the Fish River district. Four days later Cummins and Foran arrived at Todd’s store again, just after day-break. Cummins remained on guard outside while Foran entered the house and demanded money from Todd. When he was told there was none in the house, Foran vowed, "if you do not hand it out I will blow your bloody brains out", adding, "You informing dog, you are the cause of me being a bushranger". The storekeeper eventually surrendered £4 10s. in gold and silver and the two outlaws departed, but not before Foran attempted to set fire to a Todd’s haystack.

At about noon on Thursday, 11 April, the Mudgee mail-coach was stopped at Blackman’s Flat (near Wallerawang) by Cummins and Foran. The driver and two passengers were robbed of bank-notes, a gold watch and a knife, and the mail-bags were taken.

Early on Friday morning, 12 April 1867, Larry Cummins and John Foran entered the bar of Edward Locke’s public-house at Dirty Swamp on the north side of the Fish River (13 miles south-east of Bathurst). They asked the publican for a glass of port wine and as he turned to serve them the two bushrangers drew their revolvers. While Cummins covered the publican, Foran went to the dining room where five travellers were eating breakfast; he ordered them outside where they were bailed up against a fence. In the bar Cummins said to Lock: "You’re a great fellow I believe, to resist the bushrangers. If you make any resistance now I’ll riddle you". However, the publican was a belligerent man, and challenged Cummins to a fair fight, saying "I’ll fight either or both of you, either with my hands or a revolver". The outlaw took up the challenge and the two went outside. Cummins "handed his revolver to his mate, Locke pulled off his coat, and a regular set-to was commenced". As they fought, with the hotel guests "begging the bushrangers not to use their fire-arms", the publican hit Cummins with a blow that caused him to stagger, which prompted Foran to intervene, pointing his revolver at Locke and threatening to "quieten the b----". The publican, realising the danger he was in, desisted and sat down on a stool. Cummins went to him and struck him a number of times on the temple and back of the head until Locke "was almost stupefied". The bushrangers then searched their captives and appropriated what money they found. Locke refused to be searched, but held out six shillings he had in his pocket; Cummins "did not press him, nor did he take the silver offered". A search of the house revealed several pounds in silver. They also stole Locke’s riding boots and spurs and his seal-skin coat. Before departing the bushrangers ordered all their captives into the bar and ‘shouted’ for them. Demanding three bottles of whiskey off the shelf they then took their leave.

When Cummins and Foran left Dirty Swamp they crossed the Fish River and headed straight for Anne Webb’s store at Mutton Falls, 25 miles from Bathurst on the old Fish River road, arriving there mid-morning. The men were observed riding up to the store by two of Mrs. Webb’s daughters. Hannah Webb suspected the men were bushrangers and told her brother Robert to get his guns ready. The two men had entered the premises under the pretense of being customers when Cummins presented his revolver at Elizabeth Woods, daughter of the store-owner, saying, "If you move by the Holy ---- I will put the contents of this through you". Cummins then went into the adjoining room where Hannah and her younger sister were, and brought them into the store. Leaving Foran guarding the sisters, Cummins went from the store into the hall, heading towards the kitchen. At that moment Hannah Webb screamed. Robert Webb, in his bedroom, raised the window and saw Cummins running out of the back door with a revolver in his hand. When Cummins was within five yards of him Robert fired his double-barrelled shot-gun loaded with bird-shot, causing the bushranger to fall to the ground having been shot in the face; he then rallied, got to his feet and, leaving a trail of blood, ran back through the house. In the store, hearing the gunfire, the other bushranger ran out the door. Cummins and Foran were mounting their horses when Robert Webb fired his shot-gun again. As the men were galloping away he ran outside and fired after them with his other gun. In their hasty departure the bushrangers left a hat, a poncho, a bottle of whiskey and a purse containing the coins stolen earlier that morning from Lock's public-house.

As soon as the alarm was raised and horses saddled, three sons of Mrs. Webb (two of them settled on farms in the district) set out in pursuit of the bushrangers, "the blood still marking their route". Witnesses to their flight reported them "thumping their horses with their revolvers, Cummins leading the way; and both riders bare-headed". Their tracks, however, were lost at Diamond Hill, three miles from the store.

=== Conviction and prison ===
After being wounded Larry Cummins made his way to the house of his brother-in-law, Josiah Cramp, at Porter’s Retreat near the Little River (north of the Abercrombie River). The police, however, received word of his whereabouts and a party, consisting of three constables and a black tracker, led by Senior-sergeant Grainger, was sent to apprehend him. They arrived at Cramp’s residence on Tuesday, 2 May 1867, where two women came outside to meet them. One of the women implored the police not to fire, to which Grainger replied: "Let him give himself up, and I won’t". The woman then went back inside. Grainger called out: "Cummings, surrender at once; it is of no use now holding out"; and the bushranger replied, "I will, if you will treat me like a man". Cummins then came out of the house and said, "Here I am now". When he was arrested Cummins had two revolvers ("capped and loaded, and at full cock") and a double-barrelled gun in the house. Cummins was taken to Rockley that night and the next day brought to Bathurst. Josiah Cramp, in whose hut the bushranger was found, was at the time on bail on a charge of sheep-stealing. The wounds from where Cummins had been shot at Webb's store, on his right cheek and neck, were noted at his arrest.

On Tuesday, 7 May 1867, Lawrence Cummins was charged with attempting to rob Mrs. Webb’s store at Mutton Falls in mid-April, in company with John Foran. After hearing evidence from members of the Webb family, Cummins was committed to stand trial at the next Circuit Court in October next. Immediately afterwards Cummins was charged with the armed robbery of the mailman, John Burke, in mid-March 1867. The mailman gave evidence to the court and, on this charge, Cummins was remanded for further evidence.

In the late-afternoon of Sunday, 30 June 1867, Constable William Wiles from Taralga, accompanied by two other constables, Wiles’ son George and John Chalker, proceeded to Larry Cummins’ mother’s house at Menangle Creek near Bolong, where they had been informed the bushranger, John Foran, was located. The men surrounded the house and the elder Wiles knocked on the door and announced he was the police. At the back of the house Foran "threw down two slabs from the hut" and ran towards a fence, with a revolver in each hand. George Wiles, stationed at the back of the house, "called on him to stand" but Foran responded by presenting a revolver at the trooper. Wiles fired at the bushranger with his horse pistol. The bushranger fell to the ground, wounded and yelling with pain. Constable Chalker appeared from around the corner of the house and Foran aimed a revolver at him, but William Wiles, also arriving at the scene, fired his rifle near the bushranger, who then surrendered his weapons and was taken into custody. Foran ended up with two wounds in his chest and shoulder from the confrontation, both described as "slight flesh wounds". Foran was taken to the Taralga lock-up and conveyed to Goulburn the following day. The next day Foran was charged with highway robbery under arms in the Goulburn Police Court (relating to the Mudgee mail robbery in April), after which he was remanded to Bathurst "for further examination". On Monday, 19 August, John Foran was charged at Bathurst with armed robbery of Mrs. Webb’s store at Mutton Falls on the Fish River and the earlier robbery at Locke’s public-house at Dirty Swamp, after which the prisoner was remanded in custody to be tried at the next Circuit Court.

On Friday, 25 October 1867, Cummins and Foran were sentenced in the Bathurst Circuit Court. Lawrence Cummins pleaded guilty to six charges of robbery with arms and was sentenced to thirty years’ "hard labour on the roads or other public works of the colony". John Foran, who had pleaded guilty to three charges of armed robbery, received fifteen years’ "hard labour on the roads". Larry Cummins was returned to Berrima Gaol to serve his sentence.

=== The Governor's prerogative ===
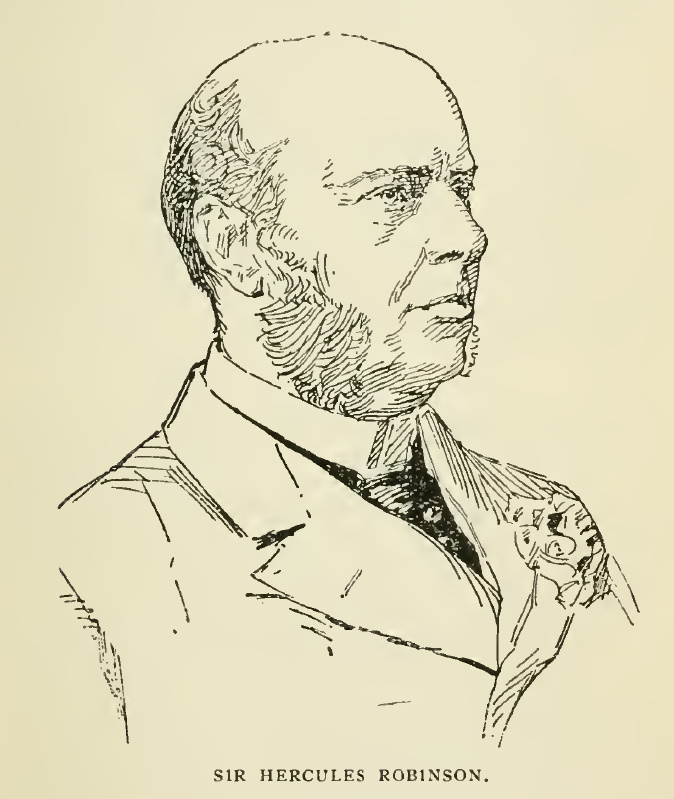
Sir Hercules Robinson, Governor of New South Wales from 1872 to February 1879.

In 1872 a petition was organised by the sisters of the notorious bushranger, Frank Gardiner, who had been convicted in July 1864 and sentenced to 32 years "on the roads". The petition was prepared for presentation to the newly-appointed Governor of New South Wales, Sir Hercules Robinson, seeking Gardiner’s early release. The Governor, as representative of the English sovereign, had the power to exercise the Royal prerogative of mercy for felony cases not subject to the death penalty. By the time it reached the Governor in September 1872 it had attracted the signatures of a number of prominent public men. After consideration, Robinson decided that Gardiner could be eligible for a pardon, but only after he had served ten years incarceration and providing his conduct in prison remained good, conditional upon him leaving the country on release and becoming an exile from the Australian colonies and New Zealand.

These arrangements became public knowledge in March 1874, four months prior to Gardiner’s anticipated release from prison. In response to this impending event the Parkes government had determined upon the commutation of sentences of a number of other prisoners convicted during the bushranging era of the 1860s and whose cases were "of a similar character" to Gardiner’s. This response was rationalised as a corrective measure, "in view of the severe sentences which the Judges at that time thought necessary in order to put down bushranging". Each prisoner’s "age, conduct, and circumstances" would be considered in deciding who was to have their sentences commuted. On 22 May 1874 a list of names and details of 24 prisoners was tabled in the Legislative Assembly for the consideration of the parliament. The prisoners, "whom it is proposed to exile or liberate during the next twelve months", were categorised as "men convicted of the crime of bushranging, at and about the time of Christie’s [Gardiner’s] conviction". One of the prisoners approved for early release was John Foran, Cummins' partner in crime. His record was notated: "May be brought forward for conditional pardon in January 1874".

When these arrangements became widely known there was political and public uproar, much of it directed at Parkes’ government and its apparent complicity in the release of the prisoners. The decision prompted counter-petitions and rancorous debates in the Legislative Assembly, which eventually led to the fall of Parkes' government by February 1875.

On 25 February 1875 the Minister of Justice in the new Robertson ministry, Joseph Docker, recommended to the New South Wales Governor, Sir Hercules Robinson, that the prisoner, Lawrence Cummins, should be released in January 1876, providing that "his conduct continued good". The Governor concurred with the recommendation. However, communication of the Government's intention was inadvertently conveyed to the prisoner in March 1875, in a letter from Cummins’ mother that was passed to him by the gaoler at Berrima. This action made it impossible, "with due regard to the honour of the Government", to re-consider the matter. It was subsequently disclosed that, in communication on the subject between Robinson and Docker, the Governor had expressed the opinion that the judicial sentence "on the roads" had "been converted into one of imprisonment with hard labour within the walls of a gaol", a change he described as "arbitrary" and "an illegal exercise of Executive authority". The Minister of Justice Docker was alarmed that such a high authority as the colonial Governor should express doubts about the legality of sentences, especially if it became known to those prisoners who were presently serving sentences falling under that category. The matter was then referred to the Attorney-General, William Bede Dalley, who, in March 1875, issued a statement of opinion concluding that "the practice questioned by the Government was not illegal".

The uncertainty engendered by the debate concerning the possible illegality of the judicial sentence "on the roads" was probably the major factor that led to Cummins’ release, as his behaviour while in prison would have lessened the chance of such an outcome. A newspaper report detailing the events that led to Cummins’ release made the comment that "his prison career had been as conspicuously bad as Gardiner’s was signally good". Larry Cummins was released from prison in January 1876 after having served slightly more than eight years’ of his second term of imprisonment.

=== Later life ===
Larry Cummins’ wife, Bridget, gave birth to her third child in March 1873, which she named John Francis. With her husband in Berrima Gaol, Bridget used her maiden name for the surname of her child and did not include father’s details on the birth registration. Family details record that Bridget Francis left the Abercrombie River district and travelled to Georgetown, on the Ethridge River in Far North Queensland. Georgetown was the location of a gold-rush in the early 1870s, resulting in a rapid increase in population in a short period of time. In December 1871 it was reported that Georgetown township had about 500 residents, "and this is increasing almost daily by fresh arrivals from the Gilbert, Ravenswood, and other gold fields further south, and other parts of the country". By December 1873 the population of the Georgetown diggings was estimated at 800 to a thousand residents. It is feasible that Bridget Francis decided to travel to the Georgetown goldfields after the birth of her son in March 1873, most likely in company with the father of her child, in an attempt to make a fresh start. Bridget Francis died on 25 June 1876 at Georgetown.

Lawrence Cummins had relocated to Victoria by about 1879 (possibly as early as 1876 when he was released from prison), where he used the assumed name 'James Long'. In March 1880 Cummins, using his adopted name, married Ellen Cole at ‘Wadelock’ station near Maffra, in the Gippsland region of eastern Victoria. The couple’s first child was born in 1882 at ‘Wadelock’. James and Ellen Long eventually had eleven children, of which nine survived to adulthood. The family remained at Maffra until the late 1880s, after which they lived near Wodonga, on the Murray River. Long worked as a drover and was often seen about Albury, and attended sheep, cattle and horse sales. He also made and sold whips.

In his later years James Long resided "near the railway line on the Wodonga Flats" (the river-flats between Wodonga township and the Murray River). James Long (previously the bushranger Larry Cummins) died on 18 October 1909, aged 66 years. The causes of his death were multiple, recorded as hepatitis, cirrhosis and Bright’s disease. He was buried in the Wodonga cemetery.

== See also ==
- Fred Lowry (bushranger)
- John Foley (bushranger)
