= Black Springs, New South Wales =

Black Springs New South Wales
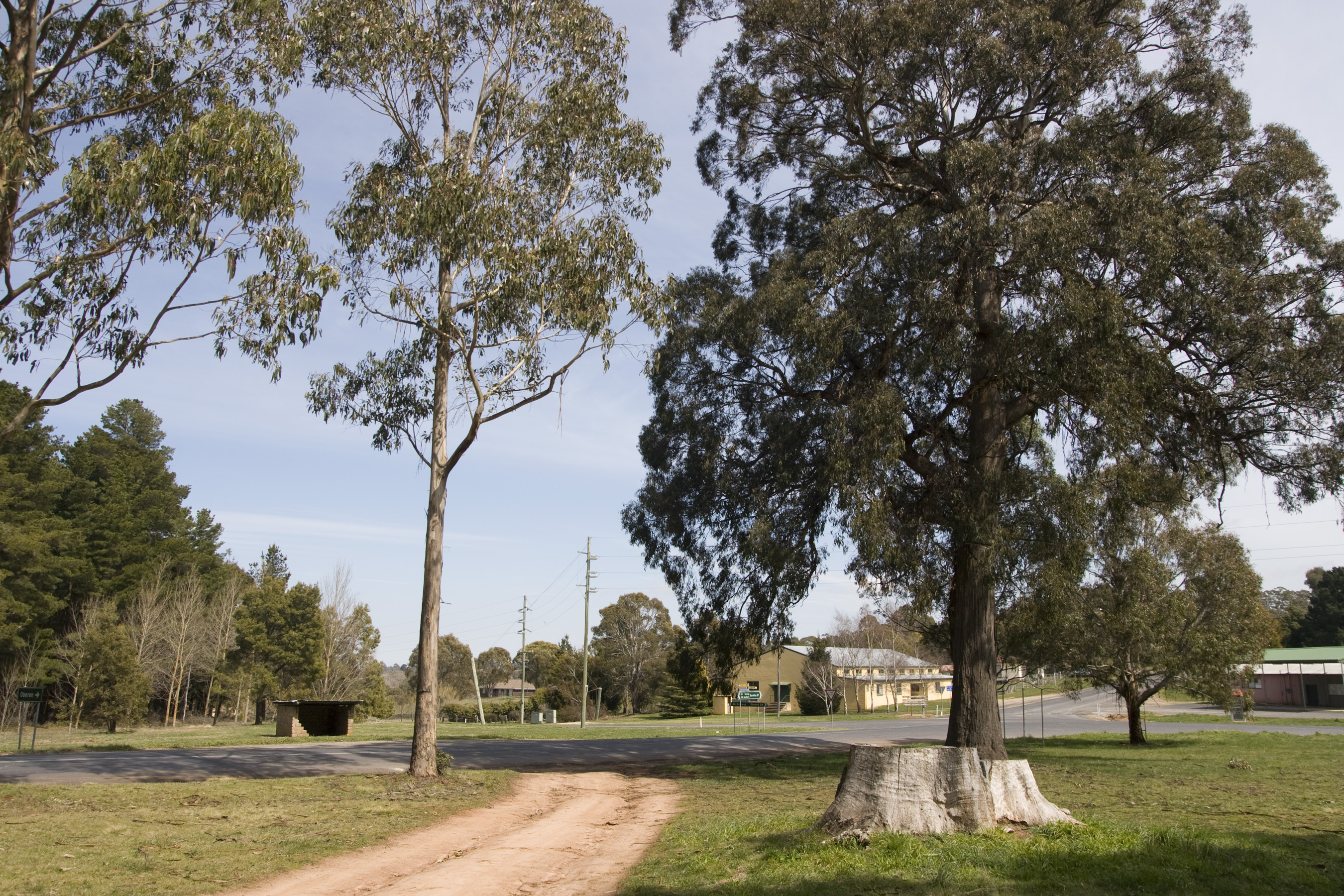

- Coordinates: 33°50′52″S 149°44′34″E
- Population: 225 (2016)
- Postcode(s): 2787
- Elevation: 1,210 m (3,970 ft)
- Location: 23 km (14 mi) SW of Oberon; 63 km (39 mi) S of Bathurst; 78 km (48 mi) SW of Lithgow; 124 km (77 mi) N of Goulburn; 202 km (126 mi) W of Sydney
- LGA(s): Oberon Council
- County: Westmoreland
- State electorate(s): Bathurst
- Federal division(s): Calare
Mean max temp	Mean min temp	Annual rainfall
15.3 °C; 60 °F	3.6 °C; 38 °F	1,008.5 mm 39.7 in

Black Springs, New South Wales is a village on the Great Dividing Range at an elevation of 1,210 metres (3,970 ft) and situated 138 km west of Sydney as the crow flies. It is located at 33 51.0493 °S, 149 44.41956 °E The post Code of the village is 2787. It is famous for its fossicking. It is midway between Taralga, New South Wales and Oberon, New South Wales. Black Springs, 24 kilometres from Oberon on the Abercrombie Road, is a tidy village with good facilities. The tennis courts, recreation ground and community hall are located opposite the Forestry Reserve camping area, which has toilets and fireplaces. The historic stone Avoca Catholic Church and Shrine is in a lovely setting south of the village. There is also an historic cemetery. Fossicking is popular at Sapphire Bend, off Riverview Road in Vulcan State Forest.

== Facilities ==
The village retains a public school, established in 1881, and Catholic Church but in 2018 the town's Anglican church was controversially sold to pay compensation to victims of historic child sexual abuse within the diocese.

== History ==
The original inhabitants of the land around Black Spring river were Indigenous Australians of the Wiradjuri or Gundungara clans.

Explorer Charles Throsby reached Black Springs on 25 April 1819. Lachlan Macquarie visited the Cookbundoon Range in October 1820 and the first settlement in the area was in 1826.

United Irishmen James Meehan, Edward Redmond and Philip Hogan were the first settlers at Black Spring.

The cemetery has the graves of many pioneers of the area including Patrick Hanrahan, a member of Cox's road gang of 1814 and a pioneer of Black Springs, John Foley a Bushranger and Thomas Kessey a convict and pioneer of the area. Mary Hogan, née McMahon, often regarded as the matriarch of the original Black Springs community. Bushranger and ex-convict Edward Lanigan was also active in the area.

== Population ==
In the 2016 Census, there were 225 people in Black Springs. 77.7% of people were born in Australia and 85.8% of people only spoke English at home.

== Climate ==
On account of its high elevation and windward position about the ranges, Black Springs features a cool oceanic climate (Cfb) with mild, stormy summers and cold, wet winters with moderate to heavy snowfall from June to September, sometimes occurring in the late spring months.

Climate data for Gurnang State Forest (1933–1975); 1,148 m AMSL; 34.01° S, 149.84° E
Month	Jan	Feb	Mar	Apr	May	Jun	Jul	Aug	Sep	Oct	Nov	Dec	Year
Record high °C (°F)	34.5 (94.1)	34.4 (93.9)	31.1 (88.0)	25.6 (78.1)	23.3 (73.9)	16.7 (62.1)	15.0 (59.0)	18.9 (66.0)	23.9 (75.0)	26.7 (80.1)	28.9 (84.0)	33.3 (91.9)	34.5 (94.1)
Mean daily maximum °C (°F)	22.8 (73.0)	22.1 (71.8)	20.2 (68.4)	15.4 (59.7)	11.1 (52.0)	8.1 (46.6)	7.4 (45.3)	8.7 (47.7)	12.2 (54.0)	15.5 (59.9)	18.1 (64.6)	21.5 (70.7)	15.3 (59.5)
Mean daily minimum °C (°F)	9.0 (48.2)	9.3 (48.7)	7.3 (45.1)	3.8 (38.8)	1.0 (33.8)	−0.3 (31.5)	−1.6 (29.1)	−0.7 (30.7)	0.4 (32.7)	3.2 (37.8)	5.1 (41.2)	7.2 (45.0)	3.6 (38.5)
Record low °C (°F)	−0.6 (30.9)	0.0 (32.0)	−5.6 (21.9)	−4.4 (24.1)	−8.0 (17.6)	−7.8 (18.0)	−10.0 (14.0)	−10.1 (13.8)	−6.7 (19.9)	−6.7 (19.9)	−3.3 (26.1)	−1.1 (30.0)	−10.1 (13.8)
Average precipitation mm (inches)	89.8 (3.54)	78.9 (3.11)	67.7 (2.67)	70.4 (2.77)	76.2 (3.00)	96.5 (3.80)	84.6 (3.33)	89.1 (3.51)	77.9 (3.07)	85.2 (3.35)	85.3 (3.36)	75.6 (2.98)	1,008.5 (39.70)
Average precipitation days (≥ 0.2 mm)	8.9	8.8	8.6	9.5	10.9	14.1	13.3	13.1	10.6	10.6	10.2	9.0	127.6
Source: Australian Bureau of Meteorology; Gurnang State Forest
