= Cooks Vale Creek =

Cooks Vale
- Location of the Cooks Vale Creek mouth in New South Wales

Location
- Country: Australia
- State: New South Wales
- Region: South Eastern Highlands (IBRA), South Western Slopes
- LGA: Upper Lachlan

Physical characteristics
- Source: Great Dividing Range
- Source confluence: two unnamed watercourses
  - location: southwest of Hadley
  - coordinates: 34°11′55″S 149°29′38″E
- Mouth: confluence with Abercrombie River
  - location: east of Tuena
  - coordinates: 33°59′38″S 149°23′17″E
- Length: 40 km (25 mi)

Basin features
- River system: Lachlan sub-catchment, Murray–Darling basin

The Cooks Vale Creek, a mostly–perennial river that is part of the Lachlan sub-catchment of the Murrumbidgee catchment within the Murray–Darling basin, is located in the South Western Slopes region of New South Wales, Australia.

== Course and features ==
Formed by the confluence of two unnamed watercourses, the Cooks Vale Creek (technically a river) rises southwest of Hadley, on the south western slopes of the Great Dividing Range, and flows generally northwest by north before reaching its confluence with the Abercrombie River east of Tuena.

== See also ==
- List of rivers of New South Wales (A–K)
- Rivers of New South Wales
