= No Show Without Punch =

Studio album by Weddings Parties Anything
- Released: 1989
- Genre: Rock / Folk rock
- Label: Utility Records
- Producer: David Williams, Alan Thorne

Weddings Parties Anything chronology
The Big Don't Argue (1989)	No Show Without Punch (1989)	The Weddings Play Sports (and Falcons) (1990)

Professional ratings
Review scores
Source	Rating
Allmusic	4/5 stars

No Show Without Punch is a mini-album released in the United Kingdom by Australian rock band Weddings Parties Anything. It was released in 1989 on Billy Bragg's Utility label on both vinyl and CD. The mini-album comprises material from the band's 1987 debut album, Scorn of the Women, and the 1988 EP, Goat Dancing on the Tables. This was the band's only release on this label.

== Track listing ==
No Show Without Punch
No.	Title	Writer(s)	Length
1.	"Hungry Years"	Mick Thomas	4:21
2.	"Marie Farrar"	Bertol Brecht, Mick Thomas	3:26
3.	"She Works"	Mick Thomas	3:03
4.	"Goat Dancing at Falafel Beach †"	Mark Wallace, Mick Thomas	1:58
5.	"Away Away"	Mick Thomas	3:50
6.	"Tough Time (In the Old Town Tonight) †"	Mick Thomas	3:05
7.	"Scorn of the Women"	Mick Thomas	5:20

† indicates tracks from the Goat Dancing on the Tables EP; all other tracks from the Scorn of the Women album

== Personnel ==
Weddings Parties Anything

- Peter Lawler — bass
- Marcus Schintler — drums, vocals
- Dave Steel — guitar
- Mick Thomas — guitar, vocals
- Mark Wallace — accordion, vocals

Additional musicians

- George Danglin — piano (track 6)
- Janine Hall — bass (track 3 & 5)
- Michael Barclay — background vocals (track 5)
- Jeff Raglus — trumpet (track 7)

Recording details

- Alan Thorne — producer (tracks 1, 2, 3, 5 & 7)
- Weddings, Parties, Anything — producer (tracks 1, 2, 3, 5 & 7)
