= Mick Thomas =

Australian singer-songwriter, producer, guitarist and hotelier

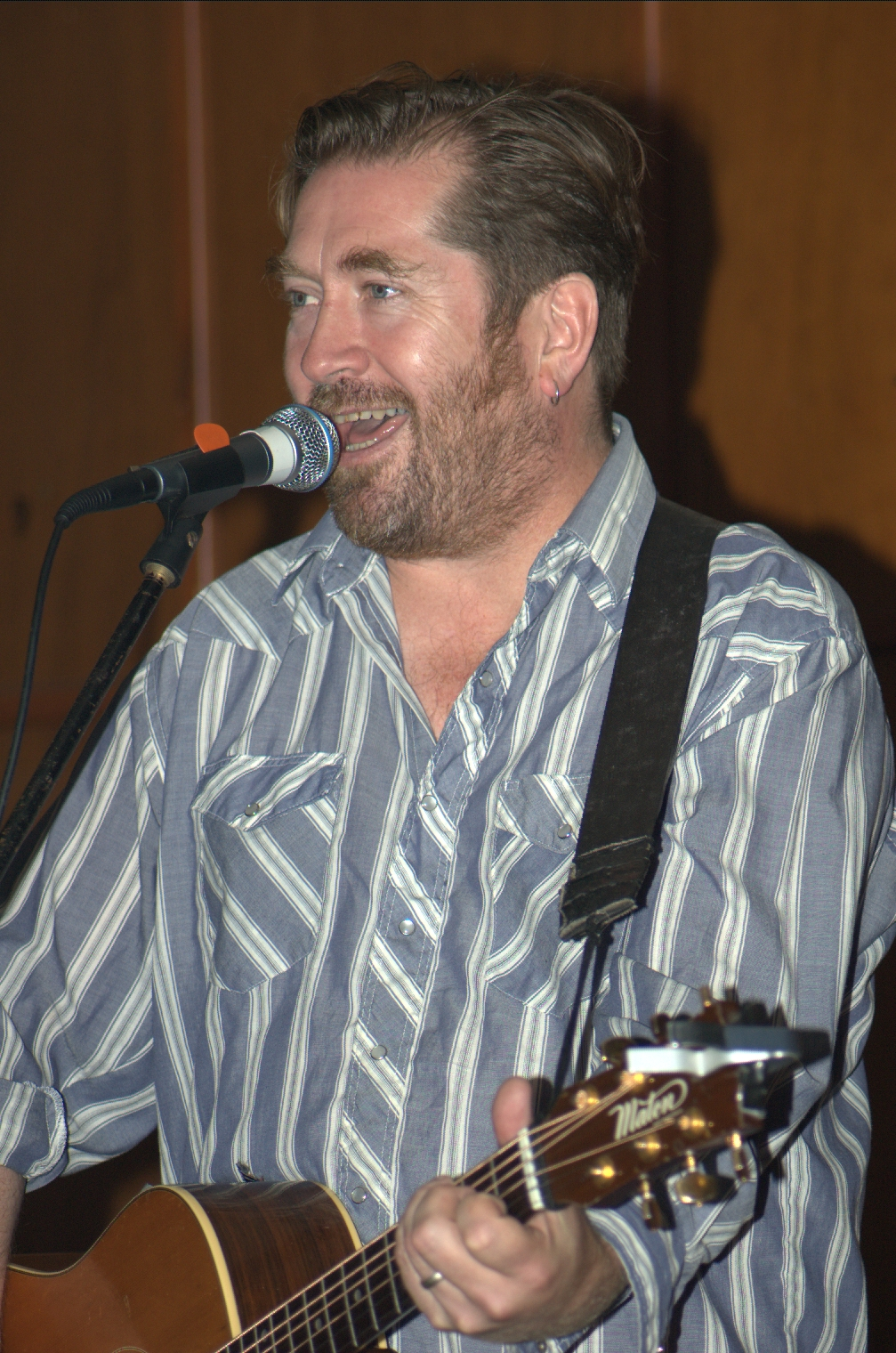
- Thomas performing at the Ebberley Arms, Barnstaple (May 2007)

Background information
- Born: Michael James Thomas; 7 February 1960 (age 66); Yallourn, Victoria, Australia
- Genre: Folk rock
- Occupations: Musician, singer-songwriter, guitarist, producer
- Instruments: Vocals, guitar
- Years active: 1975–present
- Labels: Croxton, Liberation
- Website: mickthomas.com

Michael James Thomas (born 7 February 1960) is an Australian singer-songwriter, producer, guitarist and hotelier. Thomas was the frontman of folk rock group Weddings Parties Anything (1984–1998), and leader of Mick Thomas and the Sure Thing. He has also released material as a solo artist.

== Early life ==
Michael James Thomas was born in Yallourn on 7 February 1960 and is the middle child of three. His older brother, Steve, was later a playwright. Their father, Brian Darvall Thomas (2 February 1925 – 12 September 2003), was a World War II naval veteran (23 April 1942 – 17 July 1946) and an electrical engineer with the State Electricity Commission. Brian's family were from Tasmania and his wife, Margaret, was from northern Victoria. They met in Melbourne after Brian returned from his war service.

He served in the Pacific with the Navy during the war. He was in Japan shortly after the nuclear blast on Hiroshima. He was one of those blokes who never left Australia again. He had a normal life after the war but I'm sure his dreams were full of those things.

— Mick Thomas,

The family moved with Brian's work, from Gippsland to Colac, Horsham and then Geelong. When Thomas was 15, in Geelong, he started playing folk music, initially as a solo artist. He was a member of Southern Aurora, and from 1978 to 1980 in Never Never Band which issued an independent single, "It Doesn't Mean Anything". Other members of Never Never Band were Brolga, Archie Cuthbertson on drums, Wendy Harrison on bass guitar, and Joe Nadoh on guitar. In 1981 (at age 21) he moved to Melbourne where he fronted a 1960s pop revival group, The Acrobats, from 1982 to 1983. He attended university initially at Ballarat College of Advanced Education (now Federation University) and later transferring to Deakin University at Geelong where he completed an arts degree, with majors in history, literature and sociology. With Cuthbertson other members of The Acrobats were David Adams on drums, Joe Colarazo, and Chris Dyson. He spent two years in the local pub rock scene first in 1983 in Where's Wolfgang with Adams and Dyson joined by Shane Day; and then in 1984 in Trial.

== Career ==
=== Weddings Parties Anything (1984–1998) ===
In late 1984 Mick Thomas (lead vocals, lead guitar and bass guitar) formed the first version of folk rock band, Weddings Parties Anything with former bandmate Adams (ex-The Acrobats, Where's Wolfgang). By 1985 they were joined by Mark Wallace aka Squeeze-Box Wally on piano, accordion and backing vocals. Their debut four-track extended play, Weddings Parties Anything, appeared in December 1985. It included two of "the band's early live classics", "Summons in the Morning" and "Roaring Days": both written by Thomas. In April 1987 the group issued their debut studio album, Scorn of the Women, which reached No. 52 on the Australian Kent Music Report Albums Chart. Eight of the twelve tracks were written solely by Thomas, with another track, "The Infanticide of Marie Farrar", adapted from the poem of the same name by Bertolt Brecht.

The band released further studio albums, Roaring Days (April 1988), The Big Don't Argue (October 1989), Difficult Loves (July 1992), King Tide (October 1993), Donkey Serenade (1995) and River'esque (September 1996) – with most of the material written by Thomas – before disbanding in December 1998. Thomas later explained his reasons for the split "[w]e weren't going anywhere, commercially or artistically ... Some nights you don't want to play 'Father's Day' or 'A Tale They Won't Believe'. People want them. I had to apologise for playing something new". The group had toured both nationally and internationally – they became popular in Canada and parts of United States. Fellow Australian musician, Paul Kelly, described touring with Thomas' group "[w]e did a lot of shows with The Weddos ... and had all-night singalongs with them ... and at afternoon barbecues in lead singer Mick's big backyard down by the river ... We liked a drink and weren't shy about it, but The Weddos made us look like ladies at a tea party". He noted that Thomas' musical influences were The Pogues, Fairport Convention (and guitarist Richard Thompson), Banjo Paterson and Henry Lawson.

Two of their singles, "Father's Day" (May 1992) and "Monday's Experts" (September 1993), appeared in the top 50 on the ARIA Singles Chart; both are written by Thomas. During their career they won four ARIA Music Awards – 'Best New Talent' (1988), 'Best Indigenous Release' (1989, 1990) and 'Song of the Year' for "Father's Day" (1993). According to Australian musicologist, Ian McFarlane, the band "united two great Australian music traditions: post-punk pub rock and folk/bush balladry".

=== Solo and the Sure Thing ===
Mick Thomas wrote a play, Over in the West (1996), a country rock opera, which was performed at the Playbox Theatre. The official cast soundtrack was released the following year. In June 1999 Over in the West was performed at the Maverick Arts Festival, with Thomas also contributing the role of Mr Robert, leader of a pub rock band. The play was described in McFarlane's Encyclopedia of Australian Rock and Pop as a "gripping saga scanning an entire continent, two hotels and a pinball machine".

Following the demise of Weddings Parties Anything, Thomas embarked on a solo music career. In 1998 he issued his debut solo album, Under Starter's Orders: Live at the Continental, which was recorded during various solo performances from 1997 to 1998, while still a member of that group. Allmusic's Aaron Badgley was impressed by the audience participation "wonderful to hear the audience know ['Step in Step Out'] and to hear the pride in Thomas's voice". Aside from his own material Thomas is also a record producer and engineer for other artists. In March 1998 he produced the debut album, Fisherman’s Daughter by Perth-born singer, Kavisha Mazzella. In January 1999 he supported a tour by Elvis Costello. In October that year a track, "Our Sunshine", co-written by Thomas and Kelly appeared on the Paul Kelly and Uncle Bill album Smoke. In 2010 Kelly recalled working with Thomas "Mick was the right person for the song I hand in mind. We'd played and sung together often and shared an interest in folk music and Australian history. I had the beginnings of a melody, a few lines and, most importantly, a title – 'Our Sunshine' ... Mick and I knocked off the song by lunch". At the ARIA Music Awards of 2000, Thomas was nominated for 'Best Blues and Roots Album' for Under Starter's Orders.

By mid-1999 he formed the Sure Thing as his backing band, with Darren Hanlon on guitar, mandolin and harmonica; and Rosie Westbrooke on double bass. About this time he started the now defunct label, Croxton Records, with his friend Nick Corr, a radio DJ and music journalist. By the end of that year Michael Barclay (ex-Weddings Parties Anything) joined The Sure Thing on drums. Mick Thomas and the Sure Thing's debut album, Dead Set Certainty: 12 Songs That Wouldn't Go Away, appeared in October 1999 on Suitcase Records / Croxton Records. Badgley compared the release to his earlier work with Weddings Parties Anything, he found it was "not as melodic, and more of a rawer sound ... but not altogether different".

On 12 March 2001 the group's second album, Dust on My Shoes, appeared; it was co-produced by Thomas with Jerry Boys. Badgley declared this to be Thomas' "best album so far ... he is truly a gifted and sensitive storyteller/writer ... [providing] a collection of short stories outlining the vulnerability and failings of the human race". Their next album, The Horse's Prayer, was issued on 3 March 2003 as a 2× CD. Thomas promoted the release with a national tour from February to May that year.

Another play, The Tank (2004), was co-written with his older brother Steve. On 18 March 2006 Thomas appeared on SBS-TV's music series, RocKwiz, which included his solo performance of "Away Away" and a duet with Mazzella covering The Human League's 1981 single, "Don't You Want Me". On 12 March 2007 he released another album, Paddock Buddy, on the Liberation Music label.

In 2011 he reunited with former Weddings Parties Anything bandmate, Wallace, to form Roving Commission. In February 2012 Thomas issued a solo album, Last of the Tourists, which had been recorded in Portland, Oregon with Darren Hanlon producing.

== Personal life ==
Thomas is a part-owner of the Merri Creek Tavern in Northcote. In 1993 or 1994 he bought a Maton guitar which he dubbed "Tommy Emmanuel's guitar" as it had been manufactured for the guitarist of the same name – he wrote a track, "Tommy Didn't Want You", in honour of his guitar. His father, Brian, died on 12 September 2003, aged 78, of motor neurone disease.

== Discography ==
=== Albums ===
Title	Details	Peak chart positions
Title	Details	AUS
Under Starter's Orders: Live at the Continental	Released: 1998; Label: Croxton (CROXT001); Format: CD; Note: Recorded Live at the Continental Café in Prahran	—
Dead Set Certainty (as Mick Thomas and the Sure Thing)	Released: 1999; Label: Croxton (CROXT004); Format: CD	—
Dust On My Shoes (as Mick Thomas and the Sure Thing)	Released: 2001; Label: Croxton (CROXT007); Format: CD	—
Something to Fight for (as Mick Thomas and the Sure Thing)	Released: 2003; Label: Croxton (CROXT008); Format: CD	—
The Horses Prayer (as Mick Thomas and the Sure Thing)	Released: 2003; Label: Croxton (CROXT014); Format: 2×CD	—
The Tank (with Steve Thomas)	Released: June 2004; Label: Croxton (CROXT020); Format: CD, digital download; Concept album	—
Anythings, Sure Things, Other Things	Released: August 2004; Label: Liberation Blue (BLUE0722); Format: CD, digital download	—
Other Things, Sure Things, Extra Things	Released: 2005; Label: Croxton (CROXT020); Format: CD, digital download; Note: Recorded Live at the Spiegletent	—
Paddock Buddy (as Mick Thomas and the Sure Thing)	Released: March 2007; Label: Liberation (LIBCD8220.2); Format: CD, digital download	—
Spin Spin Spin (as Mick Thomas and the Sure Thing)	Released: April 2009; Label: Liberation (LMCD0047); Format: CD, digital download	52
A Head Full of Road Kill (with Michael Barclay)	Released: 2009; Label: Croxton (CROXT050); Format: CD, digital download; Note: Recorded Live at Valve Studios, Solingen, Germany	—
Last of the Tourists	Released: February 2012; Label: Liberation Records (LMCD0165); Format: CD, digital download	—
Christmas Day at Spencers (as Mick Thomas and the Roving Commission)	Released: 2013; Label: Popboomerang Records (PB:093); Format: LP	—
These Are the Songs (A Mick Thomas Retrospective)	Released: 2017; Label: Liberation Records (LMCD0312); Format: 2×CD, digital download; Compilation	—
Coldwater DFU (as Mick Thomas and the Roving Commission)	Released: March 2019; Label: Bloodlines (BLOOD49); Format: CD, LP, digital download	—
Oh I Do Love To See Beside The B-Sides (as Mick Thomas and the Roving Commission)	Released: 2019; Label: Mick Thomas; Format: CD, digital download; Compilation	—
See You on the Other Side: A Postcard from April 2020 (as Mick Thomas and the Roving Commission)	Released: 2020; Label: Mick Thomas; Label: Brickfielders Recording Company (BRC007)	—
See You on the Other Side (as Mick Thomas and the Roving Commission)	Released: 2020; Label: Mick Thomas; Label: Brickfielders Recording Company (BRC008)	—
Cities Calling Me (as Mick Thomas and the Roving Commission)	Released: 2021; Label: Mick Thomas; Label: Brickfielders Recording Company (BRC011)	—
Where Only Memory Can Find You (as Mick Thomas' Roving Commission)	Released: 5 May 2023; Label: Mick Thomas, Coolin' by Sound	33
GoComeBack	Released: 31 October 2025; Label: Mick Thomas' Roving Commission, Coolin' by Sound	98

== Awards ==
=== ARIA Music Awards ===
The ARIA Music Awards is an annual awards ceremony that recognises excellence, innovation, and achievement across all genres of Australian music.

Year	Nominee / work	Award	Result
2000	Under Starters Orders	Best Blues & Roots Album	Nominated

=== Music Victoria Awards ===
The Music Victoria Awards are an annual awards night celebrating Victorian music. They commenced in 2006.

Year	Nominee / work	Award	Result	Ref.
2019	Coldwater DFU (as Mick Thomas' Roving Commission)	Best Country Album	Nominated	
