= Goat Dancing on the Tables =

EP by Weddings Parties Anything
- Released: November 1988
- Recorded: 1988
- Studio: Sugar Hill Studios, Houston
- Genre: Rock; Folk rock
- Label: WEA
- Producer: Alan Thorne, Weddings Parties Anything

Weddings Parties Anything chronology
Scorn of the Women (1987)	Goat Dancing on the Tables (1988)	Roaring Days (1989)

Goat Dancing on the Tables is the second extended play by Australian folk rock band, Weddings Parties Anything, which was released in November 1988. It was co-produced by Alan Thorne with the band.

The lead track, "Laughing Boy", is a cover version of Paul Kelly's tribute to Brendan Behan, which had already appeared on the band's second album, Roaring Days (April 1988). "Sergeant Small" is a live rendition of a Tex Morton song. The other two tracks, "Tough Time" and "Goat Dancing (At Falafel Beach)", were written or co-written by the band's members, Mick Thomas and Mark Wallace. "Goat Dance at Falafel Beach" was recorded at SugarHill Recording Studios, the first Australian group to record there, following the band's appearance at the 1988 Houston International Festival.

== Reception ==
Aaron Badgley at Allmusic states that the band's version of "Laughing Boy" "alone is worth the purchase of the EP" however that "the real gem of this release is the live recording of "Sergeant Small"."

Professional ratings
Review scores
Source	Rating
Allmusic	link

== Track listing ==
1. "Laughing Boy" - (Paul Kelly)
2. "Tough Time" (Mick Thomas)
3. "Sergeant Small" - (Tex Morton)
4. "Goat Dancing (At Falafel Beach)" - (Mark Wallace, Mick Thomas)

== Credits ==
- Ian McKenzie - tin whistle
- Mark Wallace - accordion, vocals (background)
- Dave Steel - guitar, vocals, vocals (background)
- George Danglin - piano
- Peter Lawler - bass
- Marcus Schintler - drums, vocals (background)
- Mick Thomas - guitar, vocals, vocals (background)
