= Streets of Forbes =

Single by Weddings Parties Anything

from the album The Big Don't Argue
- A-side: "Streets of Forbes"
- B-side: "Missing in Action"
- Released: 1989
- Genre: Folk rock
- Label: WEA
- Songwriter: traditional
- Producer: Jim Dickinson

Weddings Parties Anything singles chronology
"Darlin' Please" (1989)	"Streets of Forbes" (1989)	"The Wind and the Rain" (1989)

"Streets of Forbes" (Roud # 20764) is an Australian folksong about the death of bushranger Ben Hall. The song is one of the best-known elements of the Australian folk repertoire. It has been recorded by many folk and popular artists and groups including The Bushwhackers, Gary Shearston, Niamh Parsons, June Tabor, Show of Hands, and Weddings Parties Anything. English folk singer Martin Carthy sings the song on his 1968 album But Two Came By with Dave Swarbrick.

Paul Kelly made his public debut singing the Australian folk song "Streets of Forbes" to a Hobart audience in 1974. "The Streets of Forbes" is usually listed as traditional or anonymous, but Gary Shearston writes that "there are reasons for thinking John McGuire, (Ben Hall's brother in law), may well have been the original author".

== Lyrics ==
The song recounts how Ben Hall left his station and became a bushranger for three years and was then shot dead by police in 1865. The song paints Hall in a sympathetic light, and portrays the police as corrupt, brutal and cowardly.

=== Cultural references ===
Forbes is a small town in New South Wales, a state of Australia. At the time of Ben Hall, Forbes was part of the Colony of New South Wales, in turn part of the British Empire.

"Lachlan men" refers to people living near the Lachlan River, which runs through Forbes.

A station is a large Australian livestock farm.

"Traps" and "troopers" are old Australian terms for the police.

Gilbert and John Dunn were two other bushrangers who were members of Ben Hall's gang.

Bushrangers were rural outlaws in colonial Australia, who typically engaged in robbery and theft.

Goobang Creek is a small tributary of the Lachlan River.

The Bill Dargin (also known as Billy Dargin) mentioned in the song was an Aboriginal Australian tracker employed by the police to find Ben Hall.

"Prad" is old Australian slang for a horse.

"One thousand pounds" refers to the British pound, the currency of Australia during colonial times. In 1910 it was replaced by the Australian pound. In 1966 the Australian dollar became the official currency.
