= The Cost (2022 film) =

2022 Australian film

- Directed by: Matthew Holmes
- Written by: Matthew Holmes; Gregory Moss
- Produced by: Russell Cunningham; Matthew Holmes; Blake Northfield; Kurt Royan
- Starring: Jordan Fraser-Trumble; Damon Hunter; Kevin Dee; Nicole Pastor; Clayton Watson
- Cinematography: Cable Williams
- Edited by: Edward Tresize
- Music by: Ronnie Minder
- Production companies: RLC Motion Picture Entertainment; Two Tone Pictures; Bronte Pictures; La Rosa Productions
- Distributed by: Madman Films (Australia); Electric Entertainment (North America); High Fliers Films (UK/Ireland)
- Release dates: 26 November 2022 (Monster Fest); 5 October 2023 (theatrical)
- Running time: 108 minutes
- Country: Australia

The Cost is a 2022 Australian revenge drama directed by Matthew Holmes from an original screenplay by Matthew Holmes and Gregory Moss. Set over 48 hours, the film follows two men as they seek to enact vengeance on a convicted felon, by taking him deep into the bush to inflict a series of brutal punishments. It stars Jordan Fraser-Trumble, Damon Hunter, Kevin Dee, Nicole Pastor and Clayton Watson.

The director's intentions with The Cost was to explore at the moral, ethical and emotional implications surrounding vengeance and vigilante justice. The writers wanted to steer away from the tropes typically associated with vigilante films and present an act of revenge in a highly realistic way.

Some elements within the story, such as the flashbacks to the character of Stephanie, were inspired by the real-life murder of Jill Meagher.

== Plot ==
The film introduces the three main characters of David, Aaron and Troy as they individually prepare for their weekend. David is purchasing a suspicious assortment of items from a hardware store; Aaron is loading a rifle and hiding it within some camping equipment; Troy is settling into his home for a weekend of drinking and holiday planning.

Telling their partners that they are going fishing together, David and Aaron drive to Troy's home and wait for him walk to a nearby bottle shop before breaking into his home and setting up an ambush when Troy returns. They kidnap Troy at gunpoint and inject him with ketamine before tying him up and dumping in the boot of their vehicle. They drive for many hours into a regional area, but not without some close encounters with a man at a service station and a highway policeman.

Reaching a private property covered in dense bushland, David and Aaron proceed to string up Troy half-naked to a tree and inform him that they are the husband and brother of a young woman called Stephanie that he raped and murdered 12 years earlier. Unsatisfied with his reduced prison sentence and thirsting for revenge, David and Aaron tell Troy they are going to torture and kill him for his crime. They begin with an intense and torturous interrogation by beating Troy with long strips of tongue-and-groove plastic. As more beatings are inflicted on their captor, Troy begs for his life and insists that he is sorry and now a changed man, which slowly causes David to question whether or not he can go through with Troy's murder. Aaron insists that they must go ahead as planned or they will be caught and arrested for attempted murder.

When a man called Brian from a neighbouring property arrives unexpectedly and asks what they are doing, David and Aaron are forced to drug Troy once again and hide him in the bush. Brian hangs around for the afternoon befriending the two men, which allows Troy enough time to wake up from the ketamine and wriggle away into the bush. When Brian finally leaves, the two men finding Troy many hours later in the dark, still tied by his hands and feet. David refuses to kill Troy and begs Aaron to let him go, but Aaron staunchly refuses and tells David he will kill Troy on his own and that David must accept that decision.

Leading Troy to a shallow grave, Aaron is about to shoot Troy when he makes a desperate escape into the bush. David and Aaron search for Troy, only to discover that he has made it to Brian's home on the adjoining property. With Brian now alerted to the situation, the two men must choose to kill Troy or let him go - knowing that either way, there will be unfathomable consequences for them all.

== Cast ==
- Jordan Fraser-Trumble as David
- Damon Hunter as Aaron
- Kevin Dee as Troy
- Nicole Pastor as Stephanie
- Clayton Watson as Brian
- Cait Spiker as Megan
- Nadia Fragnito as Kelly
- Axel Jager as Cameron
- Mark Redpath as Sgt Leseberg
- Sotiris Tzelios as Harry
- Adam Willson as Mick
- Ella Hill-Cotter as Lucy
- Sophie Stewart as Mia
- Steve Sammut as Station Attendant
- Eleni Modinos as Station Barista

== Production ==
Principal photography on The Cost started in Melbourne, Victoria in February 2021 then moved to regional Victoria around Lauriston.

Due to multiple COVID-19 lockdowns in Victoria, the production to continuously forced to stop and start, with filming lasting over 13 months, mostly on weekends. Photography wrapped in March 2022.

To create greater realism, the cast were given a great deal of freedom to interpret their character and shape their own dialogue during filming.

== Release ==
The Cost premiered on 26 November 2022 at the Monster Fest Film Festival in Melbourne. The film received a limited theatrical release in Australia on 5 October 2023, followed by a home entertainment release by Madman Entertainment on 18 October 2023. The Blu-Ray and DVD release included a 47-minute "making of" documentary and two audio commentaries with director/co-writer Matthew Holmes and Gregory Moss, and leading members Jordan Fraser-Trumble, Damon Hunter and Kevin Dee.

The Cost also participated in the following film festivals:

- 25th Rencontres Internationales du Cinéma des Antipodes, Saint-Tropez 2023, France
- Richard Harris International Film Festival 2023, Ireland
- The Vision Splendid Outback Film Festival, Winton, Australia

== Reception ==
Upon its Australian release, The Cost received generally positive reviews. On Rotten Tomatoes, the film currently holds an approval rating of 86% based on 7 reviews, with an average score of 7.30/10.

Critics praised the performances of the three lead actors along with the film's complex moral themes, intense brutality, and psychological intensity.

Jordan Fraser-Trumble, the lead actor, was nominated for 'Best Actor in a Male Role' at the Richard Harris international Film Festival in Ireland.

Writing for the Sydney Arts Guide, film critic Richard Cotter described the film as "meditative, rich, and ready to send your moral compass into gyrations... with a conclusion and resolution unsullied by predictability, The Cost is not only one of the best Australian films of the year, but one of the finest of the genre from anywhere."

In his review for The Australian, film critic David Stratton gave the film 2.5 out of 5 stars, and commented that the film "would be more effective if it were less brutal."

== See also ==
- Cinema of Australia
