= Weddings Play Sports and Falcons =

EP by Weddings Parties Anything
- Released: 1990
- Genre: Rock / Folk rock
- Label: Virgin Records

Weddings Parties Anything chronology
| No Show without Punch (1990) | Weddings Play Sports and Falcons (1990) | Difficult Loves (1992) |

Professional ratings
Review scores
| Source | Rating |
|---|---|
| Allmusic | 3/5 stars |

Weddings Play Sports (and Falcons) is a mini-album released by Australian rock band Weddings Parties Anything of cover songs of two Australian bands, The Sports and Jo Jo Zep & The Falcons.

The album title is reminiscent of an mini-album released by The Sports - The Sports play Dylan (and Donovan)

== Track listing ==
1. "Reckless" (Ed Bates, Stephen Cummings, Andrew Pendlebury)
2. "Softly, Softly" (Stephen Cummings, Andrew Pendlebury)
3. "Stop the Baby Talking" (Stephen Cummings, Andrew Pendlebury)
4. "So Young" (Jeff Burstin, Joe Camilleri, Tony Faehse)
5. "Strangers on a Train" (Martin Armiger)
6. "Last House on the Left" (Stephen Cummings, Andrew Pendlebury)

== Charts ==
Chart performance for Weddings Play Sports and Falcons
| Chart (1990) | Peak position |
|---|---|
| Australia (ARIA) | 93 |
