= Jacob Junior Nayinggul =

Australian actor

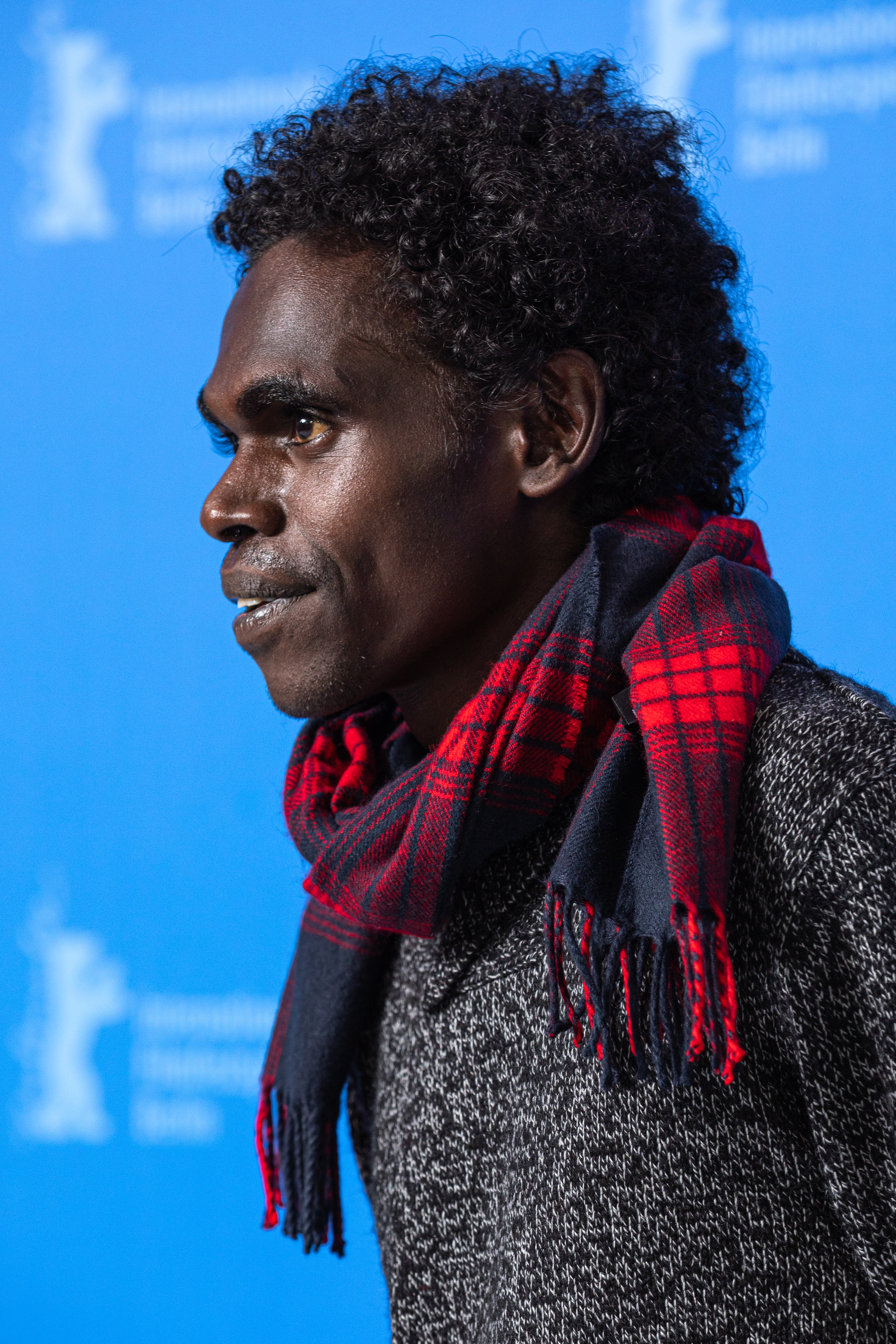
- at the Berlinale 2020
- Occupation: Actor

Jacob Junior Nayinggul is an Australian actor. His first screen role was in the feature film High Ground. For his role in the film he was nominated for the 2021 AACTA Award for Best Actor in a Leading Role.

He portrayed historical figure Woollarawarre Bennelong in reenactment sequences in the 2022 documentary series The Australian Wars.

In 2022, Jacob was cast in Matthew Holmes' shark thriller Fear Below as Jimmy Barriakada.
