= King Tide =

King Tide may refer to:

- King tide, an especially high tide
- King Tide (album), a 1993 album by Weddings Parties Anything
- King Tide (band), an Australian reggae band
- King Tide, a 2007 play by Australian playwright Katherine Thomson
- The King Tide, a 2023 Canadian drama
- "King's Tide", an episode of The Owl House

== See also ==
- King Canute and the tide
