= Jordan Fraser-Trumble =

Australian actor (born 1986)

- Born: 24 December 1986 (age 39); Adelaide, South Australia
- Occupation: Actor
- Years active: 2015–present

Jordan Fraser-Trumble is an Australian film, television and stage actor. He has appeared in the films The Legend of Ben Hall (2016), West of Sunshine (2017), The Cost (2022) and Freelance.

== Career ==
Jordan Fraser-Trumble studied at Adelaide College of the Arts from 2007 to 2009. Following that, he studied at 16th St Actors Studio in Melbourne from 2013 to 2014 before receiving a graduate position with the Red Stitch Ensemble.

Fraser-Trumble made his feature film debut as Sub-Inspector James Davidson in the bushranger biopic The Legend of Ben Hall. In 2022, he re-united with director Matthew Holmes in the leading role of The Cost, with his performance garnering critical acclaim

On television, he appeared in the Foxtel documentary series Lawless: The Real Bushrangers (2017) as bushranger Ned Kelly. He also portrayed Detective Lex De Man in the documentary TV series The Cult Of The Family (2019).

In 2024, Fraser-Trumble was announced in the cast of the upcoming war drama The Guns of Muschu.

== Filmography ==
=== Film ===
Year	Title	Role	Note
2016	The Legend of Ben Hall	Sub-Inspector Davidson	
2017	West of Sunshine	Tailor	
2018	The Green Door	Isabel's Father	
2022	The Cost	David Baker	
TBA	Love, Tea & Epiphany	Davini Malcolm	
TBA	Freelance	Kevin	

=== Television ===
Year	Title	Role	Notes
2012	Underbelly: Squizzy	Watch House Sergeant	Series
2016	The Cult That Stole Children: Inside the Family	Detective Lex De Man	Documentary
2017	Lawless: The Real Bushrangers	Ned Kelly	Documentary
