= Billy Dargin =

William Dargin (c. 1843 – 28 October 1865) was an Aboriginal Australian tracker, known for his involvement with bushranger Ben Hall.

== In media ==
Dargin was portrayed by Jack Charles in Ben Hall (1975) and by Angus Pilakui in The Legend of Ben Hall (2016).
