= Fear Below =

2024 film

- Film poster
- Directed by: Matthew Holmes
- Written by: Matthew Holmes; Gregory Moss
- Produced by: Blake Northfield; Michael Favelle
- Starring: Hermione Corfield; Jake Ryan; Jacob Junior Nayinggul; Arthur Angel; Josh McConville; Clayton Watson; Maximillian Johnson; Will Fletcher; Kevin Dee
- Cinematography: Peter Szilveszter
- Music by: Angela Little
- Production companies: Bronte Pictures; Screen Australia; Screen NSW
- Distributed by: StudioCanal
- Release date: May 15, 2025
- Running time: 85 minutes
- Country: Australia

Fear Below is a 2025 Australian action adventure horror film directed by Matthew Holmes, and starring Hermione Corfield, Jake Ryan, Jacob Junior Nayinggul, Arthur Angel, Josh McConville, Maximillian Johnson and Clayton Watson. Written by Matthew Holmes and Gregory Moss, the period-set thriller follows a team of professional divers hired to locate a sunken van in a river, only to be confronted by a territorial bull shark.

== Plot ==
Set in 1946 Australia, a struggling team of divers from the Sea Dog Diving Company is hired to locate and retrieve a sunken car from a river. When their efforts are thwarted by a highly-aggressive female bull shark, the team soon discover they are working for a ruthless criminal gang attempting to recover their stolen gold bullion, who prove to be as treacherous as the beast lurking beneath the surface.

== Cast ==
- Hermione Corfield as Clara Bennett
- Jake Ryan as Dylan 'Bull' Maddock
- Jacob Junior Nayinggul as Jimmy Barriakada
- Arthur Angel as Ernie Morgan
- Josh McConville as Janusz Wojcik
- Maximillian Johnson as Shaun Cullen
- Clayton Watson as Bob Drummond
- Will Fletcher as Sergeant Potter
- Kevin Dee as Dwight Lewis
- Tom Beaurepaire as Paul Whitemore
- Sam Parsonson as Frank Sturgess

== Production ==
Fear Below began as a spec script written by Matthew Holmes and Gregory Moss, who were passionate about creating a fresh spin on the shark thriller, as well as paying homage to classic adventure films like Jaws and Raiders of the Lost Ark. In May 2022, Producer Michael Favelle and Odin's Eye Entertainment secured key territory pre-sales for the film, with Blake Northfield of Bronte Pictures coming onboard to produce.

In August 2022, English actress Hermione Corfield was announced as the film's lead alongside Australian actors Jake Ryan, Josh McConville, Arthur Angel, Jacob Junior Nayinggul and Maximillian Johnson. Principal photography for Fear Below began in October 2022 in Echuca and Moama on the border of Victoria and New South Wales.

Locations included the historical Perricoota Station on the Murray River, which featured prominently in the 1983 Australian television miniseries All the Rivers Run.

Production on Fear Below was shut down after several days due to severe floodwaters from the Murray River which threatened the towns of Echuca and Moama where the production was based. The cast and crew were forced to evacuate after their filming locations were flooded. Filming was temporarily suspended until a new location could be found.

In November 2022, the production resumed outside the regional town of Goondiwindi, Queensland. A large lagoon running off the Macintyre River stood in for the film's central river location. In January 2023, the production moved to the Screen Queensland Studios in Brisbane. The filmmakers utilised extensive dry for wet filming techniques to stage the many underwater diving sequences, with the characters wearing standard diving dress equipment.

Practical effects and miniatures were largely employed to create the sequences featuring the bull shark, both on location and in the studio.

== Release ==
In October 2024, Fear Below premiered at the Monster Fest film festival in Australia, where it won Best Australian Feature Film.

== See also ==
- Cinema of Australia
