= Trophy Night =

Trophy Night : The Best of Weddings Parties Anything

Compilation album by Weddings Parties Anything
- Released: 25 August 1998
- Genre: Rock / Folk rock
- Length: 76:17
- Label: Mushroom Records
- Producer: Alan Thorne / Jim Dickinson / Paul Kosky / Cameron Craig / Chris Dickie

Weddings Parties Anything chronology
River'esque (1996)	Trophy Night : The Best of Weddings Parties Anything (1998)	They Were Better Live (1999)

Singles from Trophy Night
- 1. "Anthem" Released: 1998

Professional ratings
Review scores
Source	Rating
Allmusic	4.5/5 stars

Trophy Night: The Best of Weddings Parties Anything is a compilation album released by Australian rock band Weddings Parties Anything. It comprises songs from the band's seven studio albums together with two new tracks: "Anthem" and "Traffic Goes By".

Trophy Night was also released for a limited time with a bonus disc Benched, a collection of unreleased demos and assorted B-sides.

== Background ==
In early August 1998, Weddings, Parties, Anything announced that they were calling it a day, one month before this long-planned retrospective was to be released. The material for this best-of was compiled by fans who picked their favourite songs through the band's website.

"Anthem" was the only song released as a single from the album. It is a cover of a Tiddas song written by Dan Warner and Sally Dastey, which appears on their 1996 self-titled album, produced by Joe Camilleri.

== Track listing ==
All songs written by Mick Thomas, except where noted.

1. "Away Away" - 3:51
2. "Woman Of Ireland" - 2:47
3. "Hungry Years" - 4:22
4. "Scorn Of The Women" - 5:24
5. "Industrial Town" - 4:07
6. "Under The Clocks" - 3:30
7. "Roaring Days" - 2:55
8. "Sergeant Small" (Tex Morton) - 3:13
9. "Ticket In Tatts" - 3:47
10. "A Tale They Won't Believe" - 7:00
11. "Knockbacks In Halifax" - 3:26
12. "Step In, Step Out" - 4:00
13. "Father's Day"
14. "Rain In My Heart" - 4:01
15. "Monday's Experts" - 2:54
16. "Wide Open Road" (David McComb) - 4:19
17. "For A Short Time" - 5:13
18. "Anthem" (Sally Dastey, Dan Warner) - 4:17
19. "Traffic Goes By" - 3:05

Benched

All songs written by Mick Thomas, except where noted.

1. "Been Coming Here For Years" - 4:17
2. "City Of Lights" - 3:49
3. "If You Gotta Go" (D Williams, M Duncan) - 3:20
4. "The Swans Return" - 2:48
5. "Tough Time" - 3:09
6. "All Over Bar The Shouting" - 3:04
7. "Everywhere I Go" - 2:48
8. "Nothing Left To Say" - 2:52
9. "One Perfect Day" (Roger Wells) - 4:57

== Personnel ==
- Mick Thomas
- Jen Anderson
- Stephen O'Prey
- Paul Thomas
- Mark Wallace
- Michael Barclay
- Janine Hall
- Marcus Schintler
- Dave Steel
- Peter Lawler
- Richard Burgman

== Charts ==
Chart performance for Trophy Night
Chart (1998)	Peak position
Australian Albums (ARIA)	26
