= John Gilbert (bushranger) =

Australian bushranger (c.1842–1865)

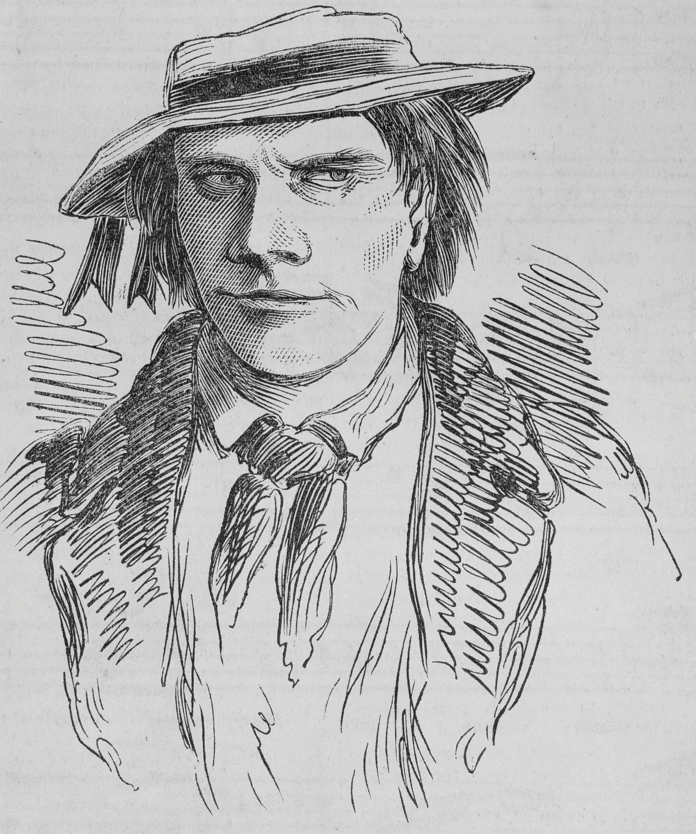
- Engraving of John Gilbert
- Born: c. 1842; Hamilton, Canada West
- Died: 13 May 1865 (aged 22–23); Binalong, New South Wales
- Cause of death: Death by gunshot
- Occupation: Bushranger
- Organization: Ben Hall gang
- Parents: William Gilbert (father); Eleanor Wilson (mother)

Johnny Gilbert (c. 1842-1865) was an Australian bushranger who was shot dead by the police at the age of 23 near Binalong, New South Wales on 13 May 1865.

Gilbert was a member of Ben Hall's gang. Hall and Gilbert were both shot by police within a week of each other. Hall was shot dead on 5 May 1865 near Forbes. Hall wanted to stop bushranging & decided to go it alone. He dissolved the partnership with the gang then Gilbert and John Dunn travelled to Binalong where Dunn had relatives.

== Early life ==
He was born in Hamilton, Canada West, around 1842. His mother Eleanor (née Wilson) died shortly after his birth. His father William subsequently married Eliza Cord, a woman only slightly older than his eldest surviving daughter, Eleanor. In 1852 John accompanied his family to the Victorian goldfields. Nine members of the Gilbert family arrived in Port Phillip on board the Revenue in October 1852. They included William and Eliza, Eleanor (Ellen), Frank, James, Charles, Thomas Charbonnelle and Nicholas Wiseman.

A contemporary of Hall and Gardiner, Johnny Gilbert, alias Roberts, was one of the gang charged with the robbery of the gold escort at Eugowra Rocks, but had not been captured. His uncle, John Davis, was found shot in April 1854 Gilbert (then known as Roberts) was arrested and charged with murder. He was acquitted but later jailed for horse stealing.

Some suggest Gilbert accompanied his uncle, John Davis, to the Victorian goldfields. However, there is no mention of Davis on the passenger list for the Revenue, though there is a ten-year-old John Gilbert. Roy Mendham, in his book, The Dictionary of Australian Bushrangers, asserts that Gilbert was responsible for the murder of his uncle. In 1854, Davis was found shot dead, and a Joseph Roberts, an alias of John Gilbert, was tried for Davis's murder but acquitted. Roberts was later tried for horsestealing. Roberts however was said to be about seventeen, Davis's murder occurred at the Waverley Arms at Bondi Junction. It would seem that Roberts, although possibly an alias for a John Gilbert, is not the same John Gilbert. The Gilbert family history does not include the names Roberts or Davis in Australia, although Wilson was used as an alias by Charles, his older brother who fled first to New Zealand's gold fields then to California to avoid arrest.

When he was only twelve, Gilbert worked as a stablehand at Kilmore, Victoria for his sister Eleanor and her new husband, John Stafford, for a time before moving on to the Kiandra goldfields in New South Wales.

John was a literate man of thin build, known for his cheerful disposition and horse riding skills. His frequent laughter earned him the nickname 'Happy Jack'.

== Gang activities ==
At eighteen he fell under the influence of the bushranger who used the alias Frank Gardiner.

In 1862, John Gilbert was first named as an accomplice of Gardiner when they and two others held up a storekeeper. Just over a month later, John Gilbert was involved in another robbery, this time with Gardiner, and Ben Hall. From then on John Gilbert was identified as being involved in several hold-ups between Lambing Flat (Young) and Lachlan.

Frank Gardiner enlisted the assistance of John Gilbert, Ben Hall, John O'Meally, Dan Charters, Henry Manns, Alexander Fordyce and Johnny Bow, to rob the Forbes gold escort at a place called Eugowra Rocks.

On 30 July 1863, Gilbert and O’Meally were thwarted in their attempt to rob the Commercial Bank at Carcoar in the middle of the day, managing to escape from the town when the alarm was raised before they could carry out the robbery. That evening the pair robbed Stanley Hosie’s store at nearby Caloola, taking cash and a number of articles of clothing, including silk dresses, boots and shoes which they said they wanted for “their people”. At one stage Hosie challenged either of the bushrangers to lay down his arms and engage him in a “fair fight”; the bushrangers smiled at this and one said, “No mate, we don’t do business in that way”.

On 6 August 1863, three prisoners named Thomas Morris, Charles Green, and James Burke, were being conveyed from Carcoar to Bathurst on the mail coach. The prisoners, under the custody of Sergeant Morrisset and three constables, were supposed to be ‘bush telegraphs’ (sympathisers who kept bushrangers informed of police movements). The three prisoners were inside the coach, along with constables Grainger and Merrin; Sergeant Morrisset sat on box with the driver, with a female passenger between them, and Constable Sutton was following on horseback at the rear. Soon after departing, as they neared the Five Mile Waterholes, a dray was seen on the road ahead. Three horsemen came galloping towards the coach, two of whom were recognised as Gilbert and O’Meally. Gilbert and the third man rode to each side of the coach and O’Meally came to the front of the horses, shouting at the driver to "bail up". As the coach came to a stop Morrisset jumped from the box and he and the constables in the coach began to exchange fire with the bushrangers. Gilbert and O’Meally "carried on the contest", advancing and receding as they fired at the police, “and it is said they exhibited extraordinary expertness in the management of their horses – at times dropping at their sides, and then ducking down to the pommel, as they received and exchanged shots”. At one point Constable Sutton rode between the two and aimed his revolver at O’Meally, but the bushranger raised his carbine and fired first, the bullet entering Sutton’s elbow and exiting at his collar-bone. Gilbert’s horse was struck by a bullet and soon after the bushrangers rode off. The wounded trooper was taken to Blayney and the coach proceeded to Bathurst. Dr. Machattie travelled to Blayney to treat Sutton and the next day brought him to Bathurst, reporting that his patient "was progressing favourably". Newspaper reports speculated that the reason for Gilbert and O’Meally’s attack on the mail coach was to free the prisoners from police custody. However, John Vane, who had agreed to join Gilbert’s gang about a week before this incident, claimed in his biography (published in 1908) that the bushrangers had intended to rob the mail coach and the presence of policemen had taken them by surprise. The third bushranger was initially identified as John Vane, but he was later tried and acquitted of being involved in the attack. Vane’s own account describes the third man as “a resident of the locality”.

On 15 November 1864 the gang robbed the Gundagai Mail near Jugiong and Gilbert shot Sergeant Parry dead.

== Gilbert's capture and death, based on the report from Constable Hales ==
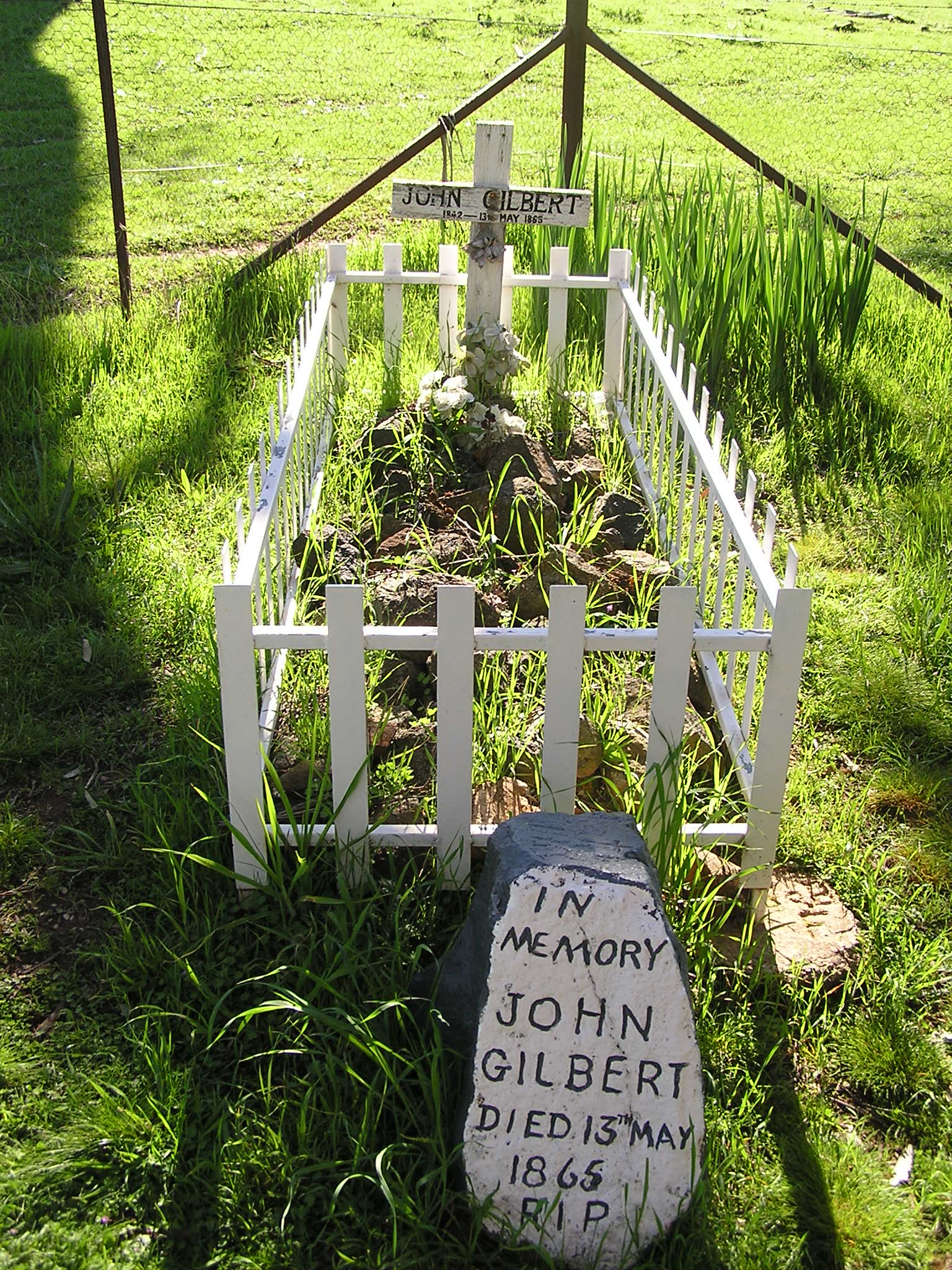
Gilbert's grave near Binalong

Senior Constable Charles Hales of the Binalong police station received information at 8:00 PM on 12 May 1865 that the two bushrangers had "stuck up" the Woolshed near Murrumburrah. He suspected they would be in the area of Binalong due to John Dunn's relatives living in the area. He thought they might visit John Kelly, Dunn's grandfather.

Senior Constable Hale immediately gathered constables John Bright and Michael King and headed out to watch Kelly's house. They watched most of the night, but saw no one enter, so returned to the police station about half a mile away.

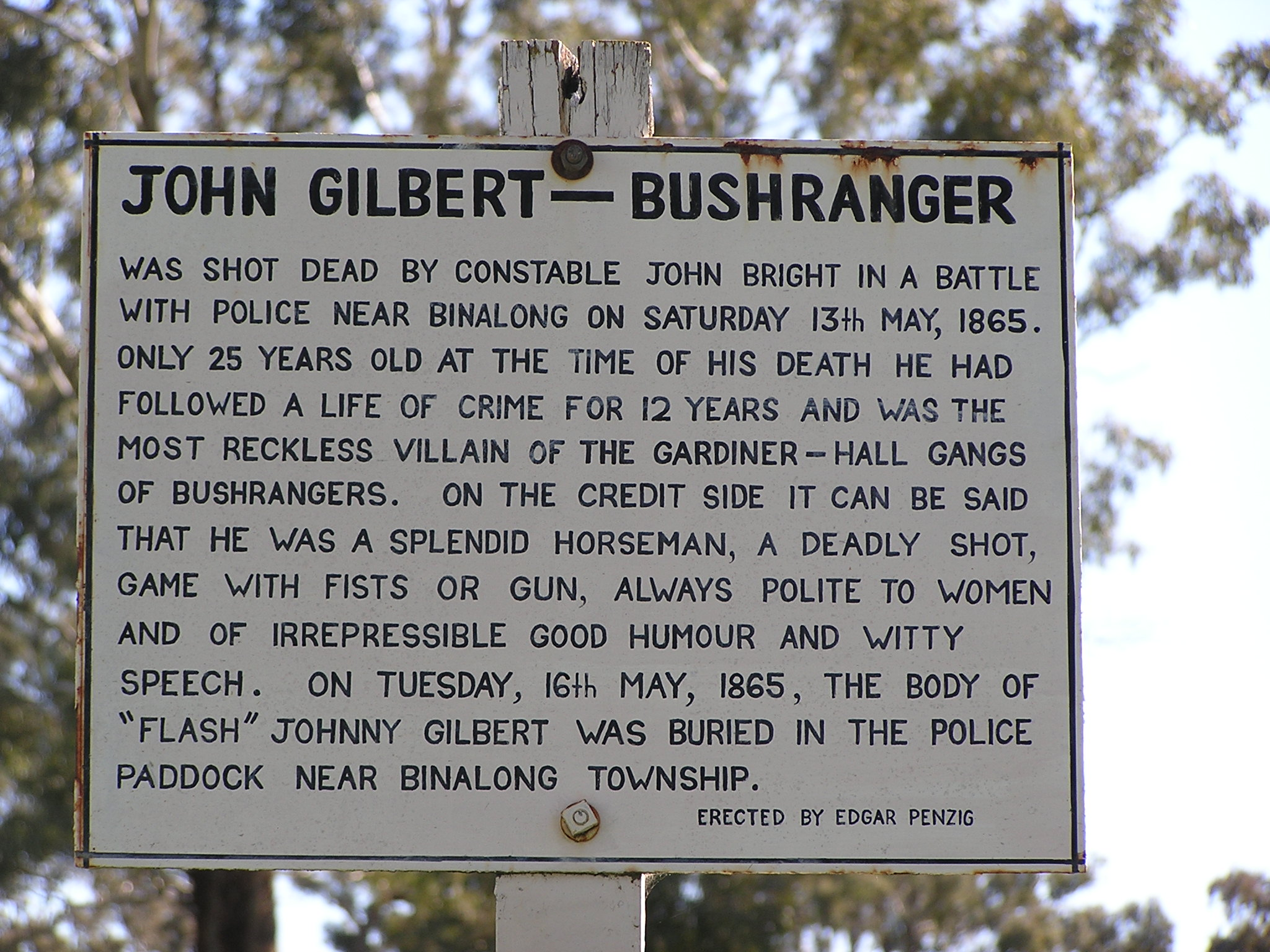

The next morning at 8:00 AM, John Kelly (under the influence of alcohol) informed Senior Constable Hales that Gilbert and Dunn were at his hut. Hales gathered Constables John Bright, Michael King and Henry Hall and headed to Kelly's place. Two parties were formed, Bright and Hall went to the back of the hut and were stationed in the creek. Hales and King were stationed at the front of the hut.

The troopers watched for about an hour in the rain. At some stage Kelly's son, Thomas, approached the stockyard. Hales called him over to ask if there were strangers in the house, to which he said "No." Hales and King approached the house and the dogs started barking. John Kelly and his wife came to the door of the hut, and seeing Trooper Hales, Kelly called out "Look out, the hut is surrounded by bloody troopers." As Hales entered the hut two shots were fired, Hales looked through the slabs of the bedroom wall to see the shadows of two men. Hales immediately fired and ran to the front room of the hut. He then called out "Men, surround the hut—the bushrangers are inside". Hales warned Kelly if he did not immediately turn out, they would burn the hut.

Hales heard firing in the paddock at the end of the hut. He ran out to the area and saw the bushrangers firing at Constables King and Hall. The bushrangers kept up the fire as they got through a bush fence that led to the creek and took up position behind a large tree. Gilbert used his revolving rifle on Hales and Bright but it misfired. Meanwhile, King and Hall took up positions. Dunn and Gilbert started firing their revolvers at Hall and King, and ran down to the creek. Hales and Bright immediately fired at the bushrangers, at which time Gilbert dropped.

Hales ordered his men to follow and to chase Dunn. King was left to guard Gilbert's body as King was wounded in the foot. The three constables chased Dunn for about a mile and a half, they were exhausted and had to give up the pursuit. Dunn escaped, but was caught later and was hanged on 19 March 1866.

The 3 constables returned to Gilbert's body. Constable Henry Hall was put in charge of the body. They searched the body and found money, jewellery, powder flask, guns, and bullets. The guns included a Tranter revolving rifle and a government issue revolver.

Gilbert's body was taken back to the Binalong police station and deposited at the court house. John Kelly and his son were apprehended and brought before Magistrate Campbell of Yass. They were remanded for 8 days and released on bail.

An inquest was held on 14 May 1865 and it was generally agreed that Constable John Bright fired the fatal shot. It was also agreed that Gilbert had died instantly. The verdict of the jury at the inquest was "justifiable homicide." The jury also found "that Senior Constable Hales and Constables Bright, King and Hall were deserving of great praise for the gallant and courageous manner in which they acted." Gilbert's body was buried in the police paddock behind the station.

The Government reward for the dead bushranger was divided up as follows: the informer received £500; Hales, £150; Bright, £130; King, £120; and Hall £100.

At the time of his death he had become Australia's worst criminal, being involved in more than 630 hold-ups.

== Folklore ==
As a member of Ben Hall's gang, Gilbert is mentioned in a number of songs about Hall's life and exploits. For example, in the chorus of a song called "The Morning of the Fray", also called"Eugowra Rocks", the chorus runs:

You can sing of Johnny Gilbert Dan Morgan and Ben Hall
But the bold and reckless Gardiner he's the boy to beat them all

In the song "Ben Hall", the fifth verse references Gilbert and Dunn:

With twelve revolving rifles all pointed at his head
Where are you Gilbert? where is Dunn? he loudly did call
It was all in vain they were not there to witness his downfall

There is a similar song about "Frank Gardiner", where the third verse gives a slightly different version of Gilbert's death to the history books:

Young Vane, he has surrendered, Ben Hall's got his death wound
And as for Johnny Gilbert, near Binalong was found
He was all alone and lost his horse, three troopers came in sight
And he fought the three most manfully, got slaughtered in the fight

Gilbert is also mentioned in "The Streets of Forbes", another song about Ben Hall.

Gilbert is also the subject of a poem by Banjo Patterson, titled "How Gilbert Died". While it is great poetry, it is somewhat romanticized and cavalier of the facts of his death.

== Film and television ==
- John Gilbert appeared in the 1977 ABC-BBC-20th Century Fox television series Ben Hall, and was portrayed by Australian actor John Orcsik.
- John Gilbert is a major character in the 2016 feature film The Legend of Ben Hall and is portrayed by Australian actor Jamie Coffa.

== See also ==
- Frank Gardiner–Ben Hall gang
