= Arthur Angel =

Australian actor (born 1970)

- Born: 16 July 1968 (age 58); Thessaloniki, Greece
- Occupation: Actor
- Years active: 1993–present

Arthur Angel is an Australian film, television and stage actor of Greek heritage. He has appeared in films including Metal Skin (1994), Ghost Rider (2007), Van Diemen's Land (2009), The Chronicles of Narnia: The Voyage of the Dawn Treader (2010), Red Dog (2011), The Legend of Ben Hall (2016), That's Not Me (2017), West of Sunshine (2017), My First Summer (2020) and the upcoming Fear Below (2024).

On television, he is known for his roles in the series Heartbreak High (1996), Stingers (2002–2004), Miss Fisher's Murder Mysteries (2012), Mystery Road (2018), Preacher (2019) and Last King of the Cross (2023).

== Career ==
Angel made his feature film debut in 1994 as Paul Secchi in director Geoffrey Wright's Metal Skin opposite Aden Young.

Angel has appeared in a number of Australian and international feature films and television series, most notably as Vanno in Red Dog and Robert Greenhill in Van Diemen's Land.

Angel directed and starred in the short film Boy Saviour (2017).

In 2022, Angel joined the cast of the period-set shark thriller Fear Below. Angel was announced in the casting line-up for the upcoming war drama The Guns of Muschu in April 2024.

== Filmography ==
=== Film ===
Year	Title	Role	Note
1994	Metal Skin	Paul Secchi	
2007	Ghost Rider	Officer Edwards	
2009	Van Diemen's Land	Robert Greenhill	
2010	The Chronicles of Narnia: The Voyage of the Dawn Treader	Rhince	
2011	Red Dog	Vanno	
2016	The Legend of Ben Hall	Edward Morriss	
2017	West of Sunshine	Steve	
2017	That's Not Me	Nick	
2018	Upgrade	Old Bones Patron	
2020	My First Summer	Mick	
2024	Sleeping Dogs	Bartender Jessie	
2025	Fear Below	Ernie Morgan	

=== Television ===
Year	Title	Role	Notes
1993	Snowy	Salvatore	Series
1994	Under the Skin	Dino	Series
1995	Police Rescue	Emilio	Series
1996	Heartbreak High	Antonio	Series
1998	Wildside	Mario Milos	Series
2000	Water Rats	Vincenzo Bellini	Series
2001	Going Home	Stefanos Pappadopoulos	Series
2002–2004	Stingers	George Soulos	Series
2007–2010	The Librarians	Nikko	Series
2011	Underbelly Files: Infiltration	Vinnie Messina	TV Movie
2011	Small Time Gangster	Wasel	Mini-series
2011	Rush	Jeff Crombie	Series
2012	Miss Fisher's Murder Mysteries	Ben Rodgers	
2012	Australia on Trial	Carboni	Mini-series
2012	Dangerous Remedy	Marinkovic	TV Movie
2018	Mystery Road	Chris Kollias	Series
2018	Wrong Kind of Black	Con	Series
2018	Back in Very Small Business	Costa	Mini-series
2019	Preacher	Craig	Series
2020	Halifax:Retribution	Strano	Series
2023	Last King of the Cross	Elias Cirilo	Series
2024	Swift Street	Sergio	Series
