= Riveresque =

river'esque

Studio album by Weddings Parties Anything
- Released: September 1996
- Venue: Blenheim House
- Studio: Seed Recording Studios, EMI Studios 301
- Genre: Rock, folk rock, country
- Length: 57:38
- Label: Mushroom/Festival
- Producer: Dylan Hughes, Cameron Craig, Weddings Parties Anything

Weddings Parties Anything chronology
| Donkey Serenade (1995) | river'esque (1996) | Trophy Night: The Best of Weddings Parties Anything (1998) |

Riveresque (styled as river'esque) is the ninth studio album by Australian folk rockers, Weddings Parties Anything. It was released in September 1996 with band members co-producing alongside Cameron Craig and Dylan Hughes. It peaked at No. 34 on the ARIA Albums Chart. According to the inlay card: "Riverésque after the style of a river winding, flowing towards the sea, meandering."

It is the first album on their new record label, Mushroom Records, and was initially distributed by Festival Records. After Mushroom's CEO Michael Gudinski dropped Festival as their distributor he took up with Sony Music Australia.

Re-release pressings of river'esque were issued in October 1997 and feature a different sleeve. It includes a bonus nine-track CD, Garage Sale, which was also available separately at their live performances during 1997. The bonus CD has three cover versions: Tim Hardin's "Reason to Believe", Susanna Clark and Richard Leigh's "From the Heart", and Ewan MacColl's "Sweet Thames Flow Softly".

== Reception ==
Professional ratings
Review scores
| Source | Rating |
|---|---|
| Allmusic | 4.5/5 stars |
| Mega Music Reviews | 4.5/5 stars |
| Amazon.com | 4.5/5 stars |

Australian musicologist, Ian McFarlane, felt that river'esque was "another top-notch release, mixing storming rockers with pristine ballads. Anderson's gypsy violin also served to flesh out the band's honest and direct songs." Aaron Badgley of AllMusic opined that "the band has their trademark sound, mostly due to Michael Thomas's impassioned vocals, but there seemed to be a new energy in this release. In particular, Jen Anderson's violin playing seems more in the foreground, producing a very melancholy sound to the typically sad songs of regrets, lost loves, unrequited loves, and the struggles of being musicians. The sound on this CD leans more toward alternative country than folk, but it works incredibly well." While the bonus disc, Garage Sale, "features a much looser sound, and three cover versions... Overall a pleasant CD, but it does not live up to River'esque, and sounds more like outtakes or B-sides. Fun for fans, but not much of an interest to the casual listener."

== Track listing ==
All tracks are written by Mick Thomas, except where noted

river'esque
| No. | Title | Length |
|---|---|---|
| 1. | "Houses" (M. Thomas, Paul Thomas) | 3:35 |
| 2. | "Don't Need Much" | 2:36 |
| 3. | "A Decent Cup of Coffee" | 4:39 |
| 4. | "The Ghosts of Walhalla" | 4:04 |
| 5. | "For a Short Time" | 5:11 |
| 6. | "The Sound of a Train" (Jen Anderson, M. Thomas) | 3:57 |
| 7. | "Lifestyles of the Rich and Famous" (M. Thomas, P. Thomas) | 3:04 |
| 8. | "In Your Room" | 4:15 |
| 9. | "Lights of Devonport" | 5:36 |
| 10. | "The Afternoon Sun" (C. P. Cavafy, M. Thomas) | 3:49 |
| 11. | "Luckiest Man" | 4:14 |
| 12. | "Five Shows a Day" (Anderson, M. Thomas, P. Thomas) | 4:47 |
| 13. | "Walkerville" | 7:44 |

Garage Sale
| No. | Title | Writer(s) | Length |
|---|---|---|---|
| 1. | "Rolling Home" | Stephen O'Prey, Mick Thomas |
| 2. | "Rambling Girl Returns" | M. Thomas |
| 3. | "Reason to Believe" | Tim Hardin |
| 4. | "Don't Need Much" (acoustic) | M. Thomas |
| 5. | "Cheap Brandy and Foundation" | J. Stewart, M. Thomas |
| 6. | "Garage Sale" | Jen Anderson, Michael Barclay, O'Prey, M. Thomas, Paul Thomas, Mark Wallace |
| 7. | "Sweet Thames Flow Softly" | Ewan MacColl |
| 8. | "Septembers Gone" | O'Prey |
| 9. | "From the Heart" | Susanna Clark, Richard Leigh |

== Personnel ==
Credited to:

Weddings Parties Anything

- Jen Anderson – violin, mandolin, vocals
- Michael Barclay – drums, vocals
- Stephen O'Prey – bass guitar, vocals
- Mick Thomas – guitar, mandolin, vocals
- Paul Thomas – guitar, pedal steel, vocals
- Mark Wallace – accordion, keyboards, vocals

Additional musicians

- Lou Bennett – vocals
- Anna Burley – vocals
- Sally Dastey – vocals

Production work

- Producer – Cameron Craig, Dylan Hughes, Wedding Parties Anything
- Mixer – Cameron Craig, Doug Roberts

Art work

- Photography – Jen Anderson, Mick Thomas

== Charts ==
Chart performance for Riveresque
| Chart (1996) | Peak position |
|---|---|
| Australian Albums (ARIA) | 34 |
