= Twin Rivers (film) =

- DVD cover
- Directed by: Matthew Holmes
- Written by: Matthew Holmes; Meredith Resce; Pete Court
- Produced by: Matthew Holmes; Meredith Resce
- Starring: Darren Holmes; Matthew Holmes; Robyn Dickinson; Joshua Jaeger; Hakan Magill
- Cinematography: Matthew Holmes
- Edited by: Edward Tresize
- Music by: Michael Taylor
- Production companies: Two Tone Pictures; Golden Grain Films; La Rosa Productions
- Distributed by: Ovation Entertainment (Australia/NZ) 2008–2015
- Release date: 30 March 2007 (Australia)
- Running time: 106 minutes
- Country: Australia
- Language: English

Twin Rivers is a 2007 South Australian feature film directed and written by Matthew Holmes and co-written by South Australian author Meredith Resce and Peter Court. It stars Darren Holmes, Matthew Holmes, Robyn Dickinson, Joshua Jaeger, Hakan Magill and Jonathan Western.

== Plot ==
Brothers, Thomas (Matthew Holmes) and William Norton (Darren Holmes) are swaggies, travelling from Broken Hill to Melbourne, to start an angora fur trade. After their savings are stolen by a fellow traveler called Bertie (Jonathan Western), they encounter a sick man on the road, Mr. Carmody (Oscar Peters) who they assist to the nearest town, rather than continue searching for Bertie.

Arriving in the township of Riverton, they are embraced by the sick man's family, including Alice (Robyn Dickinson) who takes to William. They secure work at a sheep station and William forms a bond with one of the workers, Jack (Joshua Jaeger). Thomas soon becomes restless and wants to continue on the journey, especially when he sees William forming a romantic attachment to Alice. The brothers become increasingly distant and short-tempered with each other, leading to a violent quarrel. Thomas leaves the sheep station while William stays on as one of the workers.

On the road, Thomas comes across Bertie and ambushes his camp one night, trying to recover their stolen money, only to discover that Bertie has spent it all. Wanting to repair his relationship with Thomas, William leaves Riverton. He reunites with Thomas, who has become increasingly ill due to the weather and lack of clean water. William does his best to get him help, but Thomas dies one night and William buries him in the bush. Grief-stricken, he returns to Riverton to be with Alice and start a life of his own.

== Cast ==
- Darren Holmes as William Norton
- Matthew Holmes as Thomas Norton
- Robyn Dickinson as Alice Carmody
- Joshua Jaeger as Jack Humphries
- Hakan Magill as Robert Locchel
- Jonathan Western as Bertie
- Oscar Peters as Mr. Carmody
- Meredith Resce as Mrs. Carmody
- David Anderson as Frank
- Stewart Lindsay as Percy
- Ross Morgan as Ron
- Edwin Hodgeman as Voice of Old William

== Production ==
Twin Rivers began production in 2001. Filmed on a micro budget with little crew, Holmes self-financed the project and shot the film on DVCAM over the course of 4 years with mostly friends and family volunteering their help.

When the South Australian Film Corporation and Screen Australia refused to support the film, Rolf De Heer (Bad Boy Bubby, Ten Canoes, The Tracker) eventually came on board as a producer, helping with the sound, writing the film’s voiceover and supervising the recut of the film. It spent a further 2 years in post production and was completed in 2007.

The documentary An Independent Epic – The Making of Twin Rivers was produced by the filmmakers in 2009, which chronicles the journey of making the film from beginning to end.

== Filming locations ==
Although set in mid-north Victoria, Twin Rivers was filmed in South Australia, with locations including Melrose and the Murray-Mallee region.

Scenes were also filmed in the historical village of Old Tailem Town (outside Tailem Bend and Murray Bridge). Rockleigh Uniting Church, east of Adelaide was also used as a backdrop.

== Release ==
Twin Rivers premiered at the Capri Cinema in Adelaide on 4 August 2007.

The film received DVD distribution with DV1 Entertainment and premiered on the Ovation channel on Foxtel in March 2009. It screened at several film festivals including the 2008 DeReel Independent Film Festival and the 2009 South Australian Screen Awards, where it was nominated for Best Feature Film.

Recut from the original master tapes and digitally remastered, the film was released on region-free limited edition Blu-ray in 2019.

== Reception ==
Graeme Tuckett at Dominion Post scored the film 4 out of 4 and called it "a quietly brilliant and entirely unexpected film (it's) the best thing playing in town this week. No contest".

== Awards and nominations ==
Year	Award	Category	Result	Ref
2009	South Australian Screen Awards	Best Feature Film	Nominated	

== See also ==
- Cinema of Australia
