= Jack Martin (Australian actor) =

Australian actor

- Martin in at a December 2016 Q&A in Adelaide
- Occupations: Actor, Writer, Musician
- Years active: 2012 - present

Jack Martin is an Australian actor. He is best known for his role as Ben Hall in the feature film The Legend of Ben Hall.

== Career ==
Martin first appeared in Channel 7's Home & Away, followed by several short film roles. His most notable performance as the 19th-century bushranger Ben Hall came in the biographical feature film The Legend of Ben Hall. He will also be reprising this role in two further companion films, forming a trilogy, based on two of Hall's contemporaries - Frank Gardiner and John Vane.

== Filmography ==
Year	Title	Role	Notes	Ref.
2018	Neighbours	Travis Webb	1 episode	
2016	The Legend of Ben Hall	Ben Hall	Feature film	
2015	Locust	Matthew	Short	
2014	The Last Days of Ben Hall	Ben Hall	Short	
2012	Judas the Peacemaker	Judas Iscariot	Short	
2012	Home & Away	Offender	1 episode	
