= They Were Better Live =

They Were Better Live : Live at the Central Club Christmas, 1998

Live album by Weddings Parties Anything
- Released: May 23, 1999
- Genre: Rock / Folk rock
- Label: Mushroom Records
- Producer: Michael Thomas

Weddings Parties Anything chronology
Trophy Night : The Best of Weddings Parties Anything (1998)	They Were Better Live : Live at the Central Club Christmas, 1998 (1999)

Professional ratings
Review scores
Source	Rating
Allmusic	4/5 stars

They Were Better Live : Live at the Central Club Christmas, 1998 is a double live album released by Australian rock band Weddings Parties Anything. The recording was of the band's series of live shows at the Central Club Hotel in Richmond. It was released after the band disbanded and was the band's first live album. Paul Kelly joins the band for a rendition of his song "Laughing Boy."

The album was nominated for an ARIA Award in 1999 for 'Best Blues & Roots Album'.

== Track listing ==
All songs written by Mick Thomas, except where noted

=== Disc 1 ===
1. "Barrett's Privateers" (Stan Rogers)
2. "Away Away"
3. "Tickets in Tatts"
4. "Monday's Experts"
5. "Industrial Town"
6. "Laughing Boy" (Paul Kelly)
7. "Sisters of Mercy"
8. "Hungry Years"
9. "Tilting at Windmills"
10. "Rambling Girl"
11. "Under the Clocks"
12. "Manana Manana"
13. "Decent Cup of Coffee"
14. "Father's Day"
15. "Rain in My Heart"
16. "For a Short Time"

=== Disc 2 ===
1. "Wide Open Road" (David McComb)
2. "Knockbacks in Halifax"
3. "Grey Skies Over Collingwood" (Ian Hearn)
4. "Luckiest Man"
5. "Step in Step Out"
6. "Rosy and Grey" (Ron Hawkins)
7. "Jolly Old Christmas Time" (Lawler)
8. "Scorn of the Women"
9. "Ladies Lounge"
10. "Roaring Days"
11. "Streets of Forbes"
12. "Sergeant Small" (Tex Morton)
13. "Woman of Ireland"
14. "A Tale They Won't Believe"
15. "No No Never"
16. "Leave Her Johnny"

== Personnel ==
- Mick Thomas
- Jen Anderson
- Stephen O'Prey
- Paul Thomas
- Mark Wallace
- Michael Barclay

== Charts ==
Chart performance for They Were Better Live
Chart (1999)	Peak position
Australian Albums (ARIA)	44
