= Difficult Loves (album) =

Studio album by Weddings Parties Anything
- Released: July 1992
- Recorded: 1991
- Genre: Rock / Folk rock
- Label: RooArt/Warner Music/WEA
- Producer: Alan Thorne

Weddings Parties Anything chronology
The Big Don't Argue (1989)	Difficult Loves (1992)	King Tide (1993)

Professional ratings
Review scores
Source	Rating
AllMusic	4.5/5 stars

Difficult Loves is the fourth studio album released by Australian rock band Weddings Parties Anything.

The album was named after a Gabriel García Márquez short story. The first single lifted from the album, "Father's Day" reached No. 29 on the Australian Singles Charts.

== Track listing ==
All songs written by Mick Thomas.

1. "Father's Day" – 4:03
2. "Taylor Square" – 3:33
3. "Difficult Loves" – 3:55
4. "Old Ronny" – 5:06
5. "Telephone in Her Car" – 2:55
6. "Nothin' But Time" – 3:23
7. "Alone Amongst Savages" – 4:21
8. "Rambling Girl" – 3:00
9. "Step In, Step Out" – 3:59
10. "The Four Corners of the Earth" – 4:45
11. "For Your Ears Only" – 3:03
12. "Do Not Go Gently" – 3:27

== Personnel ==
=== Weddings Parties Anything ===
- Pete Lawler – bass guitar, vocals
- Marcus Schintler – percussion, drums, vocals
- Mick Thomas – guitar, vocals
- Paul Thomas – guitar, vocals
- Mark Wallace – accordion, vocals
- Jen Anderson – violin

=== Additional musicians ===
- Stan Armstrong – vocals
- Michael Barclay – vocals
- Ray Pereira – percussion
- Andy Reid – clarinet
- Conway Savage – piano
- Patricia Young – vocals

== Charts ==
Chart performance for Difficult Loves
Chart (1992)	Peak position
Australian Albums (ARIA)	22

== Certifications ==
Region	Certification	Certified units/sales
Australia (ARIA)	Gold	35,000^{^}
^{^} Shipments figures based on certification alone.
