= Huxton Creepers =

Australian rock band

The Huxton Creepers were an Australian rock band from Melbourne. They formed in 1984, three years after they left secondary school, and split in 1989. Their notable Australian hits were "My Cherie Amour", "I Will Persuade You" and their version of Manfred Mann's "Pretty Flamingo".

The lineup was Rob Craw (lead vocals and guitar), Paul Thomas (guitar and vocals), Matthew Eddy (bass) and Archie Law (drums). All four members attended Scotch College, Melbourne, completing their HSC year in 1981. The band has reunited on a number of occasions since their original break up, including an east coast tour in 2011, supporting The Sunnyboys in 2015, and The Models in 2016.

== Recording history ==
The first recording released by the band was the track "King Of The Road" (an original, not the Roger Miller song) on the Au Go Go Records Melbourne compilation Asleep At The Wheel, in 1984. That, and their two tracks on the Triple J compilation Cooking With George, brought them to the attention of Big Time Records, their label throughout their career. Their first album was 12 Days To Paris in 1986 and their second was So This Is Paris in 1988 (entitled Keep To The Beat on the U.S. and Canadian releases).

== After the Huxton Creepers ==
Thomas went on to be a major part of the final line up of Weddings Parties Anything and later Custard. He also played in Melbourne bands such as Four Door Shitbox and Son of John, and the skiffle group The Rock Island Linesmen. He made the album Rob Knows Paul, an acoustic album of left-over songs he and Craw had written for the Creepers, covers of Screaming Jay Hawkins, Johnny Thunders and NRBQ, as well as acoustic versions of This Day Is Mine and Better Days from So This Is Paris. He also played with Archie Roach, Ruby Hunter and Nick Barker.

Craw is a high school drama and media studies teacher. He plays in his own bands such as Rob Craw's Acoustic Dilemma and The Craw, and recorded the Rob Knows Paul album with Paul Thomas. He has written for, and played with, David Bridie and Monique Brumby. Craw also wrote original music for the Shakespeare play A Midsummer Night's Dream for Sacred Heart College, Newtown. The songs included "Hail the Duke" and "The Cause of True Love never did run Smooth".

Law returned to university after the band split, coming to prominence again in 2000 as director of the British mine clearance charity Mine Action Group (MAG), running a team of 400 people clearing land mines in Cambodia. He was employed by the United Nations, first in New York City and then in Johannesburg, South Africa. Law returned to Australia in 2007, played with the Cool Charmers and worked as the Humanitarian Director of Save the Children Australia.

Eddy recorded a solo album in 2000 called Egg, released by Corduroy Records. He works as a high school Indonesian and geography teacher.

== Reunions ==
The band reformed in June 2002 to play the Melbourne radio station 3RRR Sex Pistols Celebration at the Esplanade Hotel in St. Kilda.

The band played a show on 9 October 2009 at the Corner Hotel in Melbourne, along with The Stems, Even and The Dolly Rocker Movement.

To celebrate the re-release of their album 12 Days to Paris, the band reformed for a number of concerts on the east coast of Australia in October and November 2011.

The band played a show to support The Sunnyboys at the Forum Theatre in Melbourne on 22 March 2014.

== Discography ==
=== Studio albums ===
List of albums, with selected chart positions
Title	Album details	Peak chart positions
Title	Album details	AUS
12 Days to Paris	Released: June 1986; Format: LP, CD, Cassette; Label: Big Time (BT-7061)	63
So This Is Paris	Released: April 1988; Format: LP, CD, Cassette; Label: Big Time (BT-7084)	74
Small Mercies	Released: 1990; Format: LP, CD, Cassette; Label: Musicland Releases (MUS MLP 2014); Mini album	-

=== Compilation albums ===
Title	Album details
Afterlife	Released: 1996; Format: CD, Cassette; Label: Huxton Creepers (HC101)

=== Singles ===
List of singles, with selected chart positions
Year	Title	Peak chart positions	Album
Year	Title	AUS	Album
1984	"Wishing Well"	-	non album single
1985	"The Murderess"	-	non album single
1986	"My Cheri Amour"	-	12 Days to Paris
1986	"I Will Persuade You"	-	12 Days to Paris
1987	"Autumn Leaves "	-	12 Days to Paris
1987	"Pretty Flamingo"	33	non album single
1987	"Skin of My Teeth"	-	So This Is Paris
1988	"Rack My Brains"	-	So This Is Paris
