= King Tide (album) =

Studio album by Weddings Parties Anything
- Released: October 1993
- Recorded: Periscope Studio, Caulfield; March 1993
- Genre: Rock / Folk rock
- Label: RooArt/East-West/WEA
- Producer: Paul Kosky / Weddings Parties Anything

Weddings Parties Anything chronology
Difficult Loves (1992)	King Tide (1993)	Donkey Serenade (1995)

Singles from King Tide
- 1. "Monday's Experts" Released: August 1993; 2. "The Rain in My Heart" Released: December 1993; 3. "Island of Humour" Released: January 1994

Professional ratings
Review scores
Source	Rating
Allmusic	4.5/5 stars

King Tide is the fifth studio album released by Australian rock band Weddings Parties Anything. The album was released in October 1993 on the RooArt label and peaked at No. 20 on the ARIA Album Charts.

Billy Bragg provides the vocals with Mick Thomas on "Island of Humour". "Stalactites" marks the first occasion when all members collaborated on the writing of a WPA song and it refers to a well known Melbourne restaurant.

The first single from the album, "Monday's Experts", released in August 1993, peaked at No. 45 on the ARIA Singles Charts. The two subsequent singles, "The Rain in My Heart" (December 1993) and "Island of Humour" (January 1994) however failed to chart.

== Track listing ==
All tracks are written by Mick Thomas, unless otherwise noted

King Tide
No.	Title	Length
1.	"Monday's Experts"	2:52
2.	"Live It Everyday" (Peter Lawler, Mick Thomas, Mark Wallace)	3:48
3.	"Money Cuts You Out"	3:13
4.	"The Rain in My Heart"	3:59
5.	"It Wasn't Easy" (Mick Thomas, Mark Wallace)	4:00
6.	"Keep Talking to Me"	4:56
7.	"Island of Humour"	2:59
8.	"Easy Money" (Peter Lawler)	2:17
9.	"In My Lifetime"	4:03
10.	"Always Leave Something Behind"	5:55
11.	"If You Were a Cloud"	3:07
12.	"The Year She Spent in England"	4:38
13.	"Stalactites" (Peter Lawler, Marcus Schintler, Mark Wallace, Paul Thomas, Mick Thomas)	2:16

== Personnel ==
Credited to:

=== Weddings Parties Anything ===
- Peter Lawler - bass guitar, vocals
- Marcus Schintler - drums, vocals
- Mick Thomas - guitar, vocals
- Paul Thomas - guitar, vocals
- Mark Wallace - accordion, vocals
- Jen Anderson - strings

=== Additional musicians ===
- Billy Bragg - guitar, vocals
- Michael Barclay - vocals
- Anna Burley - vocals
- Hugh Newinson - saw
- Parkville Quartet - strings
- Students of St Joseph's School - vocals
- Barb Waters - vocals
- Stacey Wright - vocals

== Charts ==
Chart performance for King Tide
Chart (1993)	Peak position
Australian Albums (ARIA)	20
