= Russell Cunningham (producer) =

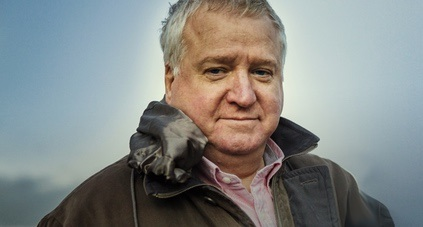

Russell Cunningham is an Australian film and television producer and writer. He is the founder of RLC Motion Picture, a film production company.

== Career ==
Cunningham started his career in 1976 on the long running children’s TV show, The Wallace and Ladmo Show. He initially commenced working with Bill Thompson (Wallace), Vladimir Kwiatkowski (Ladmo) and Pat McMahon, after securing a free toy deal for 6 months for the Ladmo Bag. In 1978 he was promoted to associate producer where he was involved with marketing, on-air talent and scripting of the show.

From 1978 to 1979, Cunningham worked as a stand-up comedian performing at the Playboy Club, Barnum & Bailey Circus, as the Hamburgler and Ronald McDonald.

In 1980, Cunningham moved to Hollywood, there he was hired to market and promote motion picture films for major studios and production companies, most notably Annie, directed by the John Huston. Pink Floyd – The Wall, starring Bob Geldof and Bob Hoskins. Flashdance, produced by Jerry Bruckheimer and starring Jennifer Beals. High Road to China starring Tom Selleck and Risky Business, starring Tom Cruise. By 1984 he had contributed to promoting over 200 motion picture films.

Cunningham began his involvement with the Australian Film Industry in 1989, when he was hired by Hoyts Cinemas following a move to Australia. At Hoyts he was in charge of cinema operations and industrial relations changes to the Australian cinema business in New South Wales and Victoria.

In 1998, he founded his own production company, RLC Motion Picture Entertainment.

In 2001, Cunningham hosted the VIP's at a Lunch with George H. W. Bush at the Sydney, Wentworth Hotel. The luncheon was the only public function attended by President Bush Snr during his three-day visit to Australia.

In 2004 he was involved with the short film Lennie Cahill Shoots Through which won the 2004 AFI award for Best Short Fiction film. Also in that year, he began work on the Australian film, G'day La, to have been directed by Tom Jeffries. It was greenlit before falling over 48 hours after signature. In 2005, he signed Micky Dolenz to direct the film.

From 2005-2009 he managed the wrestler and actor Nathan Jones.

In 2005, he began development work on Dingo Dreaming, a film that was to be shot in the Western Australian Pilbara town of Roebourne. In 2008, it was resurrected, to have been shot in Wiluna, Western Australia and star Charles Matthau, boxing champion Joe Bugner, and former professional rugby league footballer and boxing champion Anthony Mundine.

In 2012, his feature film, Birth of a Warrior was released. He wrote and co-produced the film with Anthony Salamon. It starred Tonny White, a Wing Chung Kung Fu Master.

In 2016, he produced The Legend of Ben Hall. The film was about the last nine months of Bushranger Ben Hall’s life in and around Forbes and the New South Wales country side where Ben Hall lived during his law abiding days and his final years as a wanted man.
