= The Legend of Ben Hall =

2016 film

- Theatrical film poster
- Directed by: Matthew Holmes
- Written by: Matthew Holmes
- Based on: Ben Hall
- Produced by: Russell Cunningham; Michael Favelle; Matthew Holmes; Jessica Pearce
- Starring: Jack Martin; Jamie Coffa; William Lee; Joanne Dobbin; Adam Willson; Callan McAuliffe; Jordan Fraser-Trumble
- Cinematography: Peter Szilveszter
- Edited by: Caitlin Spiller
- Music by: Ronnie Minder
- Production companies: RLC Motion Picture Entertainment; Two Tone Pictures; Emu Creek Pictures; Running Panda Films; Odin's Eye Productions; SunJive Studios; Palmarium LLC
- Distributed by: Pinnacle Films (Australia); Vega Baby/Sony Pictures (North America); WVG Medien (Germany); High Fliers Films (UK/Ireland)
- Release dates: 1 December 2016 (Australia); 28 April 2017 (Germany); 1 August 2017 (US); 2 July 2018 (UK/Ireland)
- Running time: 139 minutes
- Country: Australia

The Legend of Ben Hall is a 2016 Australian bushranger film. Written and directed by Matthew Holmes, it is based on the exploits of bushranger Ben Hall and his gang. The film stars Jack Martin in the title role, Jamie Coffa as John Gilbert, and William Lee as John Dunn.

The film focuses on the last nine months of Hall's life, when he was a well-established bushranger along with his accomplices Gilbert and Dunn. It explores the relationships within the gang and depicts many of their robberies and clashes with the police. The film also explores the details surrounding Hall's betrayal and his controversial death at the hands of the police on 5 May 1865.

The film premiered at Forbes before traveling to film festivals in Australia and overseas. It received mixed reviews from critics although its historical accuracy was praised.

== Plot ==
After two years on the road and with the law closing in around him, Ben Hall has gone in hiding and is considering surrender. However, he is drawn back into bushranging by the reappearance of his old friend and gang member, John Gilbert. Reforming the gang with a new recruit John Dunn, the trio soon become the most wanted men in Australian history after a series of robberies that result in the death of two policemen. Ben Hall also struggles to reconcile himself with his estranged son now living with his ex-wife and the man she eloped with many years earlier. When the Government moves to declare the gang outlaws, the gang make plans to flee the colony, but they are sold out by a trusted friend.

== Cast ==
- Jack Martin as Ben Hall
- Jamie Coffa as John Gilbert
- William Lee as John Dunn
- Joanne Dobbin as Biddy Hall
- Adam Willson as Mick Coneley
- Callan McAuliffe as Daniel Ryan
- Arthur Angel as Edward Morriss
- Andy McPhee as James 'Old Man' Gordon
- Erica Field as Mary Ann Coneley
- Lauren Grimson as Christina McKinnon
- PiaGrace Moon as Peggy Monks
- Lauren Gregory as Ellen Monks
- Jordan Fraser-Trumble as Sub-Inspector James Davidson
- Gregory Quinn as Sergeant James Condell
- John Orcsik as John Kelly

== Production ==
Production for The Legend of Ben Hall began in Melbourne in February 2015. Principal photography started on 29 March in Lauriston in regional Victoria and continued for over four weeks. Other locations included Nulla Vale, Spring Hill, Trentham and Maldon. Because the story is set in New South Wales, locations were selected to accurately represent various regions in New South Wales connected to the Ben Hall story, such as Forbes, Jugiong, Binalong and the Araluen Valley. Some scenes were filmed in New South Wales around Forbes and Jugiong.

Outdoor sets were constructed around the Lauriston area by Production Designer Das Patterson. The production also recycled existing film sets from previous film productions, such as The Man From Snowy River, which was also used in the American western television series Ponderosa. The now defunct Porcupine Historical Village at Maldon was also used for various indoor and outdoor scenes. Filming moved to the Melbourne Docklands Studios in May for another two weeks. The film's post production was completed in Melbourne on 5 May 2016, which coincided with the 151-year anniversary of shooting of Ben Hall at Billabong Creek on 5 May 1865.

== Short film origin ==
The Legend of Ben Hall started as a Kickstarter crowd-funded 40-minute short film, which exceeded its target production goal of $75,000.

American production company Palmarium LLC joined the project as producers, as did filmmaker Jessica Pearce, who stepped up from production manager to producer as the film geared up for filming. Victorian financier Ross Angelo also joined as a producer.

The production filmed for three weeks in August–September 2014. Locations included Lauriston, Trentham and Spring Hill in Victoria, as well as Jugiong and Forbes in New South Wales. The short film was financially supported by the Forbes Shire Council who believed in the film's potential to boost and promote tourism in the Forbes area due to its affiliation with Ben Hall history.

The project was picked up by Fox Studios Australia based producer Russell Cunningham from RLC Motion Picture Entertainment and Michael Favelle from Odin's Eye Entertainment, who came on board to develop the project as a full-length feature. The script was expanded with new characters and events so that the scenes already shot for the short film could be integrated into the feature. All of the short film cast reprised their roles, as did most of the film crew.

== Historical accuracy ==
Holmes sought to make the film as historically accurate as possible. Since 2007, he worked closely with New South Wales historian and author Peter Bradley, who acted as a historical advisor on the script to ensure the film's accurate portrayal of events. Bradley is a descendant of Ben Hall's younger brother, Henry Hall. The film's story is based on real life events that occurred between August 1864 and May 1865.

== Release ==
The Legend of Ben Hall premiered in Forbes, New South Wales on 12 November 2016 at the Forbes Showgrounds. Almost 800 people attended the premiere. Forbes was chosen due to its historical affiliation with the outlaw and because the Forbes Shire Council had supported the project in its crowdfunding stage. The premiere was followed by a two-week regional and metro tour in New South Wales, Queensland, Victoria and South Australia.

The Legend of Ben Hall had a limited theatrical release in Australia in December 2016. It was released on DVD, Blu-Ray and digital platforms on 2 March 2017. Distribution rights were picked up by Vega Baby for an 1 August 2017 release in North America. The film was also released on Blu-Ray in Germany in early 2017. Both the North American Blu-Ray release and the Australian Blu-Ray release feature the 90-minute documentary Stand & Deliver: Making The Legend of Ben Hall, an in-depth look at how the film was conceived and its journey to completion.

== Reception ==
The Legend of Ben Hall received mixed reviews, with several critics mentioning overly lengthy scenes, although its historical veracity was praised. On Rotten Tomatoes, the film has an approval rating of 54% based on 13 reviews, with an average score of 6.20/10. In 2020, it was listed amongst '10 Great Australian Westerns' in an article by the British Film Institute.

=== Awards and nominations ===
The score by Swiss-born composer Ronnie Minder was announced as one of the 145 scores eligible in the Best Original Score category in the 2017 Oscars by The Academy of Motion Picture Arts and Sciences. The film was declared "Best Foreign Western 2017" by True West Magazine and received the 'Audience Award' from the Cinema Australia website in 2016.

The Legend of Ben Hall has also participated in the following film festivals:

- 19th Rencontres Internationales du Cinéma des Antipodes, Saint-Tropez 2017, France
- Made in Melbourne Film Festival 2016, Australia
- MonsterFest 2016, Australia
- 7º Almeria Western Film Festival 2017, Spain
- Taoyuan Film Festival 2017, Taiwan
- Great Barrier Reef Film Festival 2017, Australia
- Vision Splendid Outback Film Festival 2017, Australia
- Rome Independent Cinema Festival 2018, Italy – Nominated for 'Best Foreign Film'
