= Donkey Serenade =

Studio album by Weddings Parties Anything
- Released: 1995
- Genre: Rock / Folk rock
- Length: 39:29
- Label: Independent
- Producer: Dylan Hughes / Cameron Craig

Weddings Parties Anything chronology
King Tide (1993)	Donkey Serenade (1995)	River'esque (1997)

Professional ratings
Review scores
Source	Rating
Allmusic	2/5 stars

Donkey Serenade is an independent album released by Australian rock band Weddings Parties Anything comprising four cover versions (Canada's The Lowest of the Low's "Rosy and Grey", Bob Dylan's "If You Gotta Go", Strange Tennants' "Grey Skies" and The Triffids' "Wide Open Road"), four new songs written or co-written by Michael Thomas and a couple of old songs re-recorded, "Nothing Left to Say".

The album (released on CD and cassette) was only available by mail order, via the band's website. The album featured a new bass player Stephen 'Irish' O'Prey, formerly of The Badloves, drummer Michael Barclay, and violinist Jen Anderson (The Black Sorrows) who became an official instead of part-time member of the band.

== Track listing ==
1. "Where the Highway Meets the Cane" (Mick Thomas) - 3:41
2. "In a City, Girl" (Stephen O'Prey, Mick Thomas) - 3:32
3. "Grey Skies" (Ian Hearn) - 3:45
4. "Rosy and Grey" (Ron Hawkins) - 5:18
5. "Wide Open Road" (David McComb) - 4:18
6. "Nothing Left to Say" (Mick Thomas) - 2:51
7. "A Long Time Between Drinks" (Mick Thomas, Mark Wallace) - 3:45
8. "If You Gotta Go" (Bob Dylan) - 3:19
9. "In Your Memory" (Mick Thomas) - 6:17
10. "Untitled Track" - 2:40

== Personnel ==
- Jen Anderson - mandolin, vocals
- Michael Barclay - drums, vocals
- Stephen O'Prey - bass, vocals
- Mick Thomas - guitar, mandolin, vocals
- Paul Thomas - guitar, pedal steel, vocals
- Mark Wallace - accordion, keyboards, vocals
