= Weddings Parties Anything =

Australian band

Weddings Parties Anything.
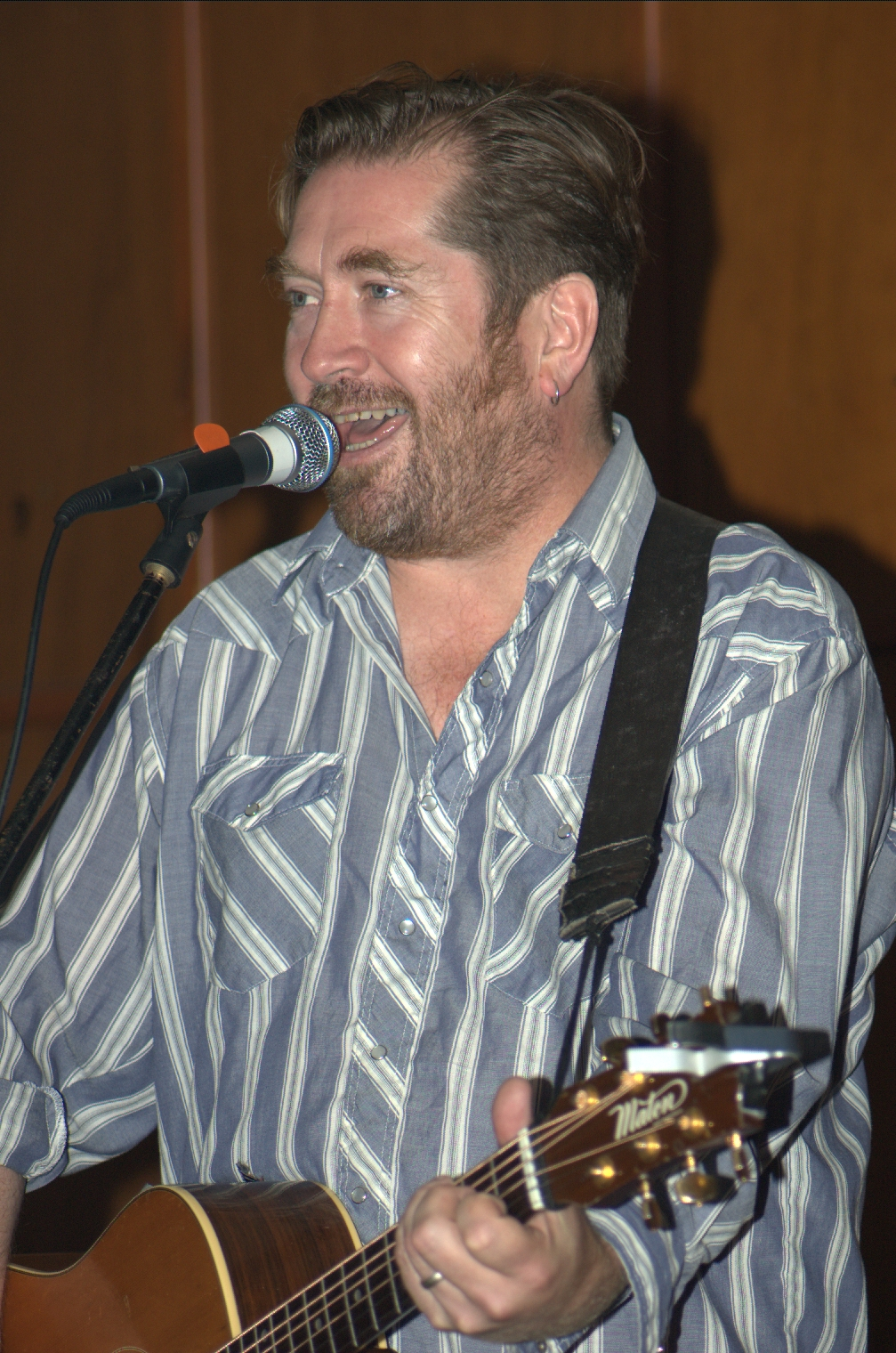
- Front man Mick Thomas

Background information
- Origin: Melbourne, Victoria, Australia
- Genres: Aussie rock, folk rock, alternative country
- Years active: 1984–1999 (reunions in 2005, 2006, 2008, 2010, 2011, 2012, 2021)
- Labels: WEA; Utility; Virgin; rooArt; Mushroom
- Members: Mick Thomas; Mark Wallace; Paul Thomas; Michael Barclay; Stephen O'Prey; Jen Anderson
- Past members: Wendy Joseph; Paul Clarke; Dave Adams; Dave Steel; Janine Hall; Richard Burgman; Peter Lawler; Marcus Schintler
- Website: mickthomas.com/weddings-parties-anything/

Weddings Parties Anything. was an Australian folk rock band formed in 1984 in Melbourne and continuing until 1999. Their name came from The Clash song "Revolution Rock". Musicologist Billy Pinnell described their first album as the best Australian rock debut since Skyhooks' Living in the 70's.

The band was led by Mick Thomas, the only continual member throughout the group's history. The single "Father's Day" was nominated for Single of the Year as well as winning Song of the Year at the 1993 ARIA awards. They were renowned for their energetic live performances and in particular their annual Christmas shows at the Central Club Hotel in Swan Street, Richmond held in the lead up to Christmas Eve every year from the late 1980s to 1998.

The band have reunited to play live on a number of occasions since their original breakup. In November 2012 the band were inducted into the EG Hall of Fame, with Mick Thomas stating that the show would be the last time the band performed. The band reunited in March 2021 for two shows in Victoria.

== Biography ==
=== 1984–1986: Formation years ===
Mick Thomas grew up in Geelong, Victoria, Australia, where he played in bush bands in his youth. In 1981 (at age 21) he moved to Melbourne and after a couple of years in Melbourne's pub rock scene with bands like Where's Wolfgang and Trial, Thomas formed the first version of Weddings, Parties, Anything. in late 1984.

"I couldn't get any rubber on the road. By about 1983 I stopped – and that was the closest to an epiphany I had, to quit and say 'I have to enjoy this or there's no point'."

— Mick Thomas

Thomas' idea behind Weddings Parties Anything was to combine that punk rock inspiration with his original love for the honest storytelling in folk music. The band was essentially based on a song he'd written, "Away, Away".

In early 1985 the group's original piano accordion player Wendy Joseph was replaced by Mark Wallace. Thomas had placed an ad looking for an accordion player, but didn't receive any responses. He then looked through the phone book for music schools and lists of their past students. After four or five schools he came up with Mark "Wally" Wallace, who'd been playing in his dad's Scottish Club band. Wallace was also listening to rock bands such as the Violent Femmes and like Thomas he was keen to put the accordion into a modern context.

"He'd rung accordion teachers out of the phone book looking for ex-students, he got on to me, and wrote me a letter with a tape with five songs on it.

— Mark Wallace

Another inclusion to the line-up was guitarist Dave Steel (Strange Tenants and Fire Down Below).

With original drummer David Adams, it was this four piece Weddings, Parties, Anything. which released a four track self-titled EP on the group's own Suffering Tram label. By the time they released their version of Tex Morton's "Sergeant Small" as a single, the line-up comprised Michael Thomas, Mark Wallace, Dave Steel, bassist Janine Hall (formerly of the band The Saints) and drummer Marcus Schintler returning to work with Thomas, after the two met at an audition as the rhythm section for Melbourne band Little Murders two years earlier. Clarke, Schintler and Thomas worked on early versions of "Away, Away" and "The River is Wide", never performing live. "Sergeant Small" was written in the 1930s about the Queensland Railway Police, and was banned soon after its release in Australia.

=== 1987–1995: First albums and success ===
In April 1987 Weddings, Parties, Anything. released its first album, Scorn of the Women. They recorded it as another independent release, but on the strength of their growing live following, the group ended up being offered a recording contract and the album was released by Warners. Janine Hall left the band following the release of the album, and was replaced by Peter Lawler, adding a mandolin to the band's repertoire. It was that line-up that produced 1988's Roaring Days. 1988 also saw Weddings Parties Anything winning its first ARIA music awards for Best New Talent, followed by another ARIA in 1989 for ARIA Award for Best Indigenous Release (Roaring Days).

Dave Steel left the band following a tour of North America, citing exhaustion as the chief reason. He also noted in several interviews, at the time of his departure (1988), that he was feeling frustrated not getting a lot of his material on the Weddings Parties Anything albums. He released his debut solo album through WEA in 1989. He was replaced by Richard Burgman (The Sunnyboys, The Saints) for the band's 1989 release The Big Don't Argue and accompanying tours.

In 1989 the band won a third ARIA for Best Indigenous Release (The Big Don't Argue), the second such award, with the nomination causing the band to boycott the awards for the second year running. In 1990 Weddings Parties Anything parted company with Warners.

The band spent a great deal of time touring over the next three years, and managed to release only one EP in 1990, titled The Weddings Play Sports (and Falcons), featuring cover versions of the bands The Sports, and Jo Jo Zep & The Falcons. The band resurfaced in 1992 with the release of Difficult Loves and yet another guitarist, Paul Thomas (Huxton Creepers), replacing the departing Richard Burgman. It was only when the album was finished that a new distribution deal was signed, with RooArt. The single "Father's Day" reached No. 29 on the ARIA charts and was nominated for 'Single of the Year' as well as winning 'Song of the Year' at the 1993 ARIA awards. This line-up (Michael Thomas, Paul Thomas, Mark Wallace, Marcus Schintler, and Peter Lawler) remained intact for two years, producing another album, King Tide in October 1993, charting at No. 45, with the single "Monday's Experts" reaching No. 45.

Following the world tour to promote that release, Marcus Schintler left the band for family reasons (later joining Sydney surf band The Wetsuits with Jon Schofield, Clyde Bramley, Stephen "Bones" Martin and Katrina Amiss). Schintler went on to pursue a career in government as Chief of Staff to the New South Wales Minister for Industrial Relations and Aboriginal Affairs. Peter Lawler left a year later to pursue a solo career (later to work with Jimmy Barnes and Tim Rogers among others).

=== 1996–present: Reformation with new lineup ===
Thomas reformed the band, and by 1996, the new Weddings, Parties, Anything. lineup was ready for its first release, the independently produced Donkey Serenade. The band now included Jen Anderson (violins, mandolin; formerly of the band The Black Sorrows), Michael Barclay (drums; Paul Kelly & The Messengers, Little Murders), Stephen O'Prey (bass; formerly of The Badloves), as well as Michael Thomas, Paul Thomas and Mark Wallace. The music style shifted somewhat from folk to a more alternative country sound. The band decided to concentrate on the Australian market, and did less touring outside of their native Australia.

The band finished 1997 with a new release and what was to be its final studio album, Riveresque on a new label (Mushroom/Sony). By 1998, the band decided to take a break and work on several solo projects, including Michael Thomas's musical Over in the West.

"I felt like the market, the industry, had pushed us into a corner. What they wanted of us was this huge Christmas tour every year and that was it. We were in danger of becoming pawns for Carlton & United Breweries. We were selling a mother lode of beer and not coming back with much to show for it."

— Mick Thomas

Weddings, Parties, Anything. initially gained a reputation as a hot new band through their constant touring in their early days, but they never really became a commercial success. They did, however, form a fanatical supporter base, known as the "Wedheads", that continued to sustain the band for years.

"Trouble was, I didn't have any room to move in the end. All the things that evolved within the crowd, the throwing of coins, all the audience participation, that became the show in itself. I started having to apologise before we played a new song!"

— Mick Thomas

Upon the conclusion of the band several members continued on to other projects, with Thomas embarking on a solo career and eventually settling with a new band, The Sure Thing, which went through many different lineups. He also established Croxton Records with friend Nick Corr. Thomas has also written or co-written plays, including Over in the West and The Tank, and is an accomplished music producer and engineer.

Jen Anderson composed live music for the black and white silent movie Pandora's Box and to accompany The Sentimental Bloke for the Melbourne International Film Festival. She has toured with Tiddas, Paul Kelly and Archie Roach, and she composed the soundtracks for Clara Law's film The Goddess of 1967 and the TV mini-series Simone de Beauvoir's Babies. She has performed on albums for Dave Graney, Hunters and Collectors, and Nick Cave and the Bad Seeds, and has produced recordings by Ruby Hunter and the Waifs.

=== Further reformations ===
Weddings, Parties, Anything. reformed for the Community Cup Football match in July 2005 and also performed at the Corner Hotel in Melbourne as a warm-up show two nights prior. The band reformed again later the next year for a one-off performance at the Queenscliff Music Festival in November 2006.

"It became obvious to us at Queenscliff that a lot of people never saw the band while we were going, and more than any time since the band broke up, we were friends. I guess we just had to wait until the time felt right. We were careful not to jump into the first thing that was offered, and believe me, we've been offered stuff."

— Mick Thomas

In January 2008, Weddings, Parties, Anything. announced March/April dates for the band's Ten Year Reunion Tour 2008, including an international performance at the Astoria (formerly The Mean Fiddler) in London on 25 April (ANZAC Day). They sold out four consecutive shows at Melbourne venue The Corner Hotel, adding a fifth to surpass the record previously held by the Hilltop Hoods from 2004.

"We've got no plans for any new recordings at all for the time being. We’ve been pretty strong that this tour be seen as a 'reunion' and not a 'reformation'."

— Mark Wallace

In 2010, 2011 and 2012 the band played Grand Final Eve shows in Melbourne.

On 20 November 2012, the band were inducted into the EG Hall of Fame (Entertainment Guide – The Age). The band played at the event, which was held at Billboard The Venue in Melbourne. Joined by original guitarist Dave Steel, they performed their first album, Scorn of the Women, in its entirety. In the lead-up to the show, The Age newspaper reported that Mick Thomas had posted on his Facebook page that it would be the last time the band performed, using the show to say a heartfelt farewell to long-standing fans.

The band reunited for two shows on 27 and 28 March 2021 at the Archies Creek Hotel in Victoria. The shows were intended as a warm-up for the band's scheduled performance at the Byron Bay Bluesfest, which was subsequently cancelled due to COVID-19.

== Live performances and Christmas shows ==
Fans would traditionally have coins ready to throw at the band as they sang the chorus of "Ticket in Tatts", while shielding their eyes. This was in reference to the lyrics concerning being "ten cents short of a dollar".

The legendary Christmas shows were held at the Central Club Hotel in Swan Street, Richmond in the lead up to Christmas Eve every year from the late 1980s to 1998. Due to their increasing popularity and live reputation as a band, the number of concerts increased as the years progressed, culminating with seven nights in a row for the last year, 1998. In the liner notes for the CD They Were Better Live, a live recording of the concerts from the final year, the bands main songwriter and singer Mick Thomas stated:

"We could never seem to make up our minds when the Christmas shows started. We'd played there when the stage was facing east and when it faced north, right through to its final resting place looking west, up toward the Tennis Centre. We'd seen it re-carpeted, painted, renovated and re-named. The only thing that never seemed to change was the enormous pillar in the centre of the room. How people cursed that pillar, but it provided a convenient place to hide, to leave your drink or cigarettes, to meet someone. And in reality it was holding the whole place up."

== Live recording ==
Various songs from the last shows in 1998 (and one track from 3 January 1999 at the Belvoir Amphitheatre near Perth, Western Australia) were recorded and released as a double live album, They Were Better Live, which was nominated for an ARIA award in 1999 for 'Best Blues & Roots Album'). The last performance was also the basis of a play, A Party in Fitzroy, by Victorian playwright Ross Mueller.

"That last series of shows was a big break-up for a lot more people than the band. I'd go every year with a certain group of my friends, and those last ones had a real sense of transition for us."

— Ross Mueller

== Musical style ==
Musically, Weddings, Parties, Anything. were a combination of Australian indie and garage rock, sixties folk, punk and (later) country and are usually described as being a folk rock band. The audience for the band was close to a mainstream rock crowd, their folk credentials were further evidenced by Celtic influences and an affinity for traditional Australian songs ("Streets of Forbes", "Sergeant Small"), plus original songs by Thomas which drew upon a similar repository of colonial folklore ("A Tale They Won't Believe"). Canadian commentator Jeremy Mouat concluded that their "music is largely concerned with the connections between past and present, whether it be the bond of memory or an identification with tradition". They led what later became known as the alt-country scene in Melbourne. The band were often compared to The Pogues, though the two bands were actually contemporaries rather than one following the other; the two bands toured Australia together in the early '90s.

== Members ==
Current

- Mick Thomas (vocals, guitar, mandolin) 1984–1999, reunions from 2005–
- Mark Wallace (piano accordion, keyboards, vocals) 1985–1999, reunions from 2005–
- Paul Thomas (guitar, pedal steel) 1989–1999, reunions from 2005–
- Michael Barclay (drums, vocals) 1993–1999, reunions from 2005–
- Stephen O'Prey (bass guitar, guitar, vocals) 1993–1999, reunions from 2005–
- Jen Anderson (violin, mandolin, guitar, vocals) 1992–1999, reunions from 2005–

Former members

- Dave Adams (drums) 1984–1986
- Richard Burgman (guitar, mandolin, tin whistle, vocals) 1988–1989
- Paul Clarke (guitar) 1984–1985
- Janine Hall (bass guitar, vocals) 1986–1987, died 2008
- Wendy Joseph (violin) 1984
- Peter Lawler (bass guitar, vocals) 1987–1993
- Marcus Schintler (drums, melodica, vocals) 1986–1993
- Dave Steel (guitar, vocals) 1985–1988

== Discography ==
=== Studio albums ===
List of studio albums, with selected details, chart positions and certifications
Title	Album details	Peak chart positions	Certification
Title	Album details	AUS	Certification
Scorn of the Women	Released: April 1987; Label: WEA (254705-1)	52	
Roaring Days	Released: May 1988; Label: WEA (255430-1)	46	
The Big Don't Argue	Released: September 1989; Label: WEA (256796-1)	58	
Difficult Loves	Released: July 1992; Label: rooArt (450990092-2)	22	ARIA: Gold
King Tide	Released: October 1993; Label: rooArt (450993773-2)	20	
Donkey Serenade	Released: 1995; Label: Weddings Parties Anything/Oz	—	
River'esque	Released: September 1996; Label: Mushroom (D93467)	34	

=== Live albums ===
List of live albums, with selected details and chart positions
Title	Album details	Peak chart positions
Title	Album details	AUS
They Were Better Live	Released: May 1999; Label: Mushroom (MUSH 33223–3)	44
2008 Ten Year Reunion Tour	Released: 2008; Label: New Found Frequency (NFFACB0032)	—

=== Compilation albums ===
List of compilation albums, with selected details and chart positions
Title	Album details	Peak chart positions
Title	Album details	AUS
No Show Without Punch	Released: 1989 (Europe and North America only); Label: Utility (UTIL 4)	—N/a
Trophy Night: The Best of Weddings Parties Anything	Released: September 1998; Label: Mushroom (MUSH33152-5)	26

=== Extended plays ===
List of EPs, with selected details chart positions
Title	EP details	Peak chart positions
Title	EP details	AUS
Weddings Parties Anything	Released: 1985; Label: Suffering Tram (ST001); Note: 1,000 copies	—
Goat Dancing on the Tables	Released: 1988; Label: WEA (0-257793)	—
The Weddings Play Sports (and Falcons)	Released: November 1990; Label: Virgin (VOZEP001)	93

=== Singles ===
List of singles, with selected chart positions
Year	Title	Peak chart positions	Album
Year	Title	AUS	Album
1986	"Sergeant Small"/"Go! Move! Shift!"	—	Non-album single
1987	"Hungry Years"	—	Scorn of the Women
1987	"Away, Away"	92	Scorn of the Women
1987	"Shotgun Wedding"	—	Scorn of the Women
1988	"Say the Word"	—	Roaring Days
1988	"Tilting at Windmills"	—	Roaring Days
1989	"The Wind and the Rain"/"Marie Provost"	—	The Big Don't Argue
1989	"Streets of Forbes"/"Missing in Action"	113	The Big Don't Argue
1990	"Darlin' Please"	136	The Big Don't Argue
1990	"Reckless"	151	Weddings Play Sports and Falcons
1991	"Father's Day"	29	Difficult Loves
1991	"Step In, Step Out"	60	Difficult Loves
1993	"Monday's Experts"	45	King Tide
1993	"The Rain in My Heart"	85	King Tide
1994	"Island of Humour"	106	King Tide
1996	"Luckiest Man"	85	Riveresque
1997	"Don't Need Much"	102	Riveresque
1998	"Anthem"	143	Trophy Night

=== DVD/video ===
- Live in Richmond/Christmas at the Central Club VHS - 18 song live recording at the Central Club in Melbourne, 1993. The video also contains interviews with members of the band between songs.
- Into Time On VHS - 20 song recording of the band playing at the Metropolis Nightclub in Perth on Friday, 16 October 1998.
- Siren VHS - Live recording of the band's last official performance at the Belvoir Amphitheatre in Perth, in January 1999.
- Long Time Between Drinks DVD/CD - Recorded live at the Queenscliff Music Festival, November 2006. Extras include music videos and Roaring Days film. Released in December 2007.

== Awards ==
=== ARIA Music Awards ===
The ARIA Music Awards is an annual awards ceremony that recognises excellence, innovation, and achievement across all genres of Australian music. They commenced in 1987 Weddings Parties Anything won four awards from seven nominations. WPA boycotted two award ceremonies in protest at being nominated for Best Indigenous Release, arguing that the category should recognise indigenous artist’s work.

Year	Nominee / work	Award	Result
1988	Scorn of the Women	Best New Talent	Won
1989	Roaring Days	Best Indigenous Release	Won
1990	The Big Don't Argue	Best Indigenous Release	Won
1990	The Big Don't Argue	Best Cover Art	Nominated
1993	"Father's Day"	Song of the Year	Won
1993	"Father's Day"	Single of the Year	Nominated
1999	They Were Better Live	Best Blues and Roots Album	Nominated

=== The Age EG Awards ===
The Age EG Awards are an annual awards night celebrating Victorian music. They commenced in 2005.

Year	Nominee / work	Award	Result
2012	Weddings, Parties, Anything	Hall Of Fame	inductee
