= The Big Don't Argue =

Studio album by Weddings Parties Anything
- Released: 1989
- Genre: Rock / Folk rock
- Label: WEA
- Producer: Jim Dickinson

Weddings Parties Anything chronology
Roaring Days (1988)	The Big Don't Argue (1989)	Difficult Loves (1992)

Professional ratings
Review scores
Source	Rating
Allmusic	4/5 stars

The Big Don't Argue is the third studio album released by Australian rock band Weddings Parties Anything. The album was produced by Jim Dickinson, who had worked with Big Star and the Rolling Stones. "A Tale They Won't Believe" relates to a story from Australia’s colonial past, a macabre account of escaped convicts making their way across Tasmania, resorting to cannibalism to survive the long trek in the bush. It was based on a passage in Robert Hughes' The Fatal Shore.

== Track listing ==
All songs written by Mick Thomas, except where noted

1. "Streets of Forbes" (Traditional)
2. "The Ballad of Peggy and Col" (Mark Wallace, Mick Thomas)
3. "Knockbacks in Halifax"
4. "Never Again (Albion Tuesday Night)" (Traditional, Mick Thomas)
5. "A Tale They Won't Believe"
6. "House of Ghosts" [mistakenly omitted from track listing]
7. "Hug My Back"
8. "The Wind and the Rain"
9. "Darlin' Please"
10. "Ticket in Tatts"
11. "Rossarden"
12. "Mañana, Mañana"

== Personnel ==
=== Weddings Party Anything ===
- Richard Burgman - guitar, vocals
- Pete Lawler - bass guitar, vocals
- Marcus Schintler - drums, vocals
- Mick Thomas - guitar, vocals
- Mark Wallace - piano accordion, vocals

=== Additional musicians ===
- Hiram Green - pump organ, tack piano
- Peter Hyrka - fiddle
- Mojo Nixon - vocals
- Skid Roper - whistle (Human)

== Charts ==
Chart (1989)	Peak position
Australian Albums (ARIA)	58
