= Roaring Days =

Studio album by Weddings Parties Anything
- Released: May 1988
- Genre: Rock / Folk rock
- Label: WEA
- Producer: Alan Thorne

Weddings Parties Anything chronology
Scorn of the Women (1987)	Roaring Days (1988)	The Big Don't Argue (1989)

Professional ratings
Review scores
Source	Rating
Allmusic	4.5/5 stars

Roaring Days is the second studio album released by Australian rock band Weddings Parties Anything. The title of the album was based on the poem "Roaring Days" by Henry Lawson.

== Track listing ==
All songs written by Mick Thomas, except where noted

1. "Industrial Town" – 4:06
2. "Under the Clocks" – 3:29
3. "Gun" (Dave Steel) – 3:43
4. "Brunswick" – 2:54
5. "Tilting at Windmills" – 2:53
6. "Sergeant Small" (Tex Morton) – 3:13
7. "Sisters of Mercy" – 4:42
8. "Roaring Days" – 2:54
9. "Say the Word" – 3:21
10. "Missing in Action" – 3:07
11. "Laughing Boy" (Paul Kelly) – 4:39
12. "Big River" (Dave Steel) – 4:32
13. "Summons in the Morning" – 3:17
14. "Morton (Song for Tex)" – 3:18

== Personnel ==
=== Weddings Party Anything ===
- Pete Lawler – bass guitar, vocals
- Marcus Schintler – drums, vocals
- Dave Steel – guitar, vocals
- Mick Thomas – guitar, vocals
- Mark Wallace – piano accordion, keyboards, vocals

=== Additional musicians ===
- Michael Barclay – vocals ("Under The Clocks")
- Barb Waters – vocals (Tilting At Windmills")
- Anthony Morgan – cello ("Sisters Of Mercy")
- Dave Docker – trumpet ("Missing In Action")
- Mick O'Connor – hammond organ ("Tilting At Windmills")
- Ian McKenzie – tin whistle ("Laughing Boy")
- Jason McDermid – brass ("Industrial Town")
- James Greening – brass ("Industrial Town")
- David Basden – brass ("Industrial Town")

== Charts ==
Chart (1988)	Peak position
Australia (Kent Music Report)	46
