= Matthew Holmes (director) =

Australian film director (born 1977)

- Born: Adelaide, South Australia Australia
- Occupations: Film director; screenwriter; actor; film producer
- Years active: 1999–present
- Spouse: Nadia Fragnito

Matthew Holmes is an Australian film director, producer, writer and actor.

== Career ==
Holmes started his film career as a stop-motion animator and sculptor on short films. He also worked as an animator on several short films directed by Michael Cusack, including The Book-Keeper, (R)evolution and Gargoyle. Gargoyle won an AACTA Award for Best Short Animation in 2006.

Holmes first feature Twin Rivers was a self-financed period drama and was made primarily with support from family and friends. Filming began in 2001 and continued for four years, wrapping in 2004. Post production took two years to complete and was aided by Australian film director Rolf de Heer.

His second feature The Legend of Ben Hall (2016) was an Australian Western based on the life of Australian bushranger Ben Hall. The film started as Kickstarter funded short film until the project was expanded into a feature. Australian director Greg McLean joined the project as an Executive Producer in February 2015. The Legend of Ben Hall was released in Australia in 2016 and internationally in 2017. In 2020, the film was listed amongst '10 Great Australian Westerns' by the British Film Institute.

Holmes' revenge-drama The Cost was released in 2023.

== Filmography ==
- The Runaway Cowboys, short (1993)
- The Galaxies Tastiest Milkshake, short (1994)
- It's a Dog's Life, short (1996)
- The Scam, short (1999)
- The BookKeeper, short (1999) (animator)
- Eggabord & Bacon-Boy, short (2001)
- (R)evolution short (2003) (animator)
- The Biscuit Effect, feature (2004)
- Gargoyle, short (2006) (animator)
- Twin Rivers, feature (2007)
- Crooked, web series (2010)
- The Vandabelles – Say Goodbye, music video (2011)
- Woody, short (2013) (animator)
- The Artifice, short (2014)
- The Legend of Ben Hall, feature (2016)
- The Cost, feature (2022)
- Fear Below, feature (2024)
