= Scorn of the Women =

Studio album by Weddings Parties Anything
- Released: April 1987
- Genre: Rock / Folk rock
- Label: WEA
- Producer: David Williams; Alan Thorne

Weddings Parties Anything chronology
| Scorn of the Women (1987) | Roaring Days (1988) |

Professional ratings
Review scores
| Source | Rating |
|---|---|
| Allmusic | 4/5 stars |

Scorn of the Women is the debut album by Australian rock band Weddings Parties Anything. The band originally recorded it as an independent release, but on the strength of the group's ever growing live following, the group ended up being offered a recording contract and the album was released by Warners. Eight songs were by Michael Thomas, three by Dave Steel, and one was an adaptation of a poem by Bertolt Brecht.

== Track listing ==
All songs written by Mick Thomas, except where noted

1. "Hungry Years" - 4:23
2. "Ladies Lounge" - 2:53
3. "Lost Boys" (Dave Steel) - 3:57
4. "The Infanticide of Marie Farrar" (Bertolt Brecht, Mick Thomas) - 3:27
5. "She Works" - 3:05
6. "Scorn of the Women" - 5:22
7. "Away Away" - 3:51
8. "The River Is Wide" - 3:51
9. "Up For Air" (Dave Steel) - 3:27
10. "By Tomorrow" - 3:42
11. "Woman of Ireland" - 2:45
12. "Shotgun Wedding" (Dave Steel) - 5:19

== Personnel ==
=== Weddings Parties Anything ===
- Janine Hall - bass guitar, vocals
- Marcus Schintler - drums, vocals
- Dave Steel - guitar, vocals
- Mick Thomas - guitar, vocals
- Mark Wallace - piano accordion, keyboards, vocals

=== Additional Musicians ===
- Louis McManus - guitar ("Ladies Lounge")
- Jeff Raglus - trumpet ("Scorn Of The Women")
- Michael Barclay - vocals ("Away Away")

== Charts ==
| Chart (1987) | Peak position |
|---|---|
| Australia (Kent Music Report) | 52 |
