= Escort Rock =

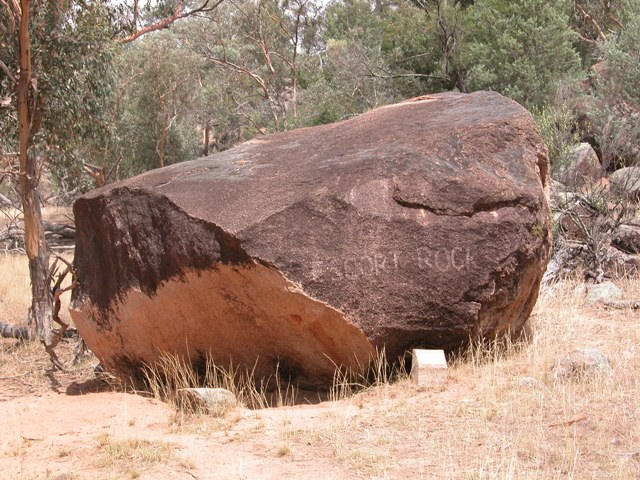

- Location within New South Wales Location within Australia
- 33.4031°S 148.4117°E
- Location: Escort Way, Eugowra, Cabonne Shire, New South Wales, Australia

New South Wales Heritage Register
- Official name: The Ben Hall Sites - Escort Rock; Eugowra Rock
- Type: state heritage (landscape)
- Designated: 8 October 2010
- Reference no.: 1827
- Type: Geological site or area
- Category: Landscape - Natural

Escort Rock is a heritage-listed geological formation along the Escort Way at Eugowra in the Central West region of New South Wales, Australia. It is one of a group of historic sites labelled the Ben Hall Sites for their association with bushranger Ben Hall, along with Ben Hall's Death Site, the Bushranger Hotel, Cliefden, the Grave of Ben Hall and Wandi. It was added to the New South Wales State Heritage Register on 8 October 2010.

== History ==
=== The robbery ===
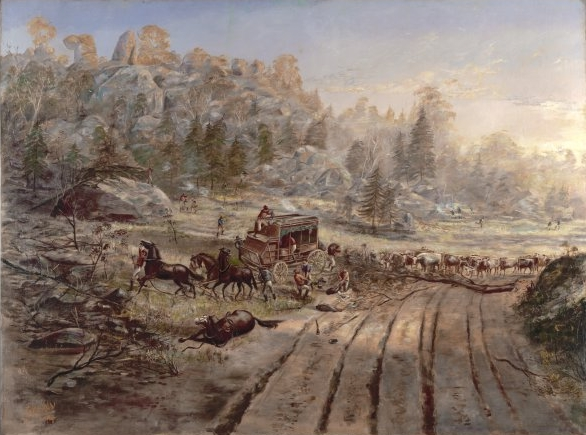
Stage coach hold-up, Eugowra Rocks, a painting by Patrick W. Marony (1894)

On Sunday, 15 June 1862, a group of bushrangers ambushed the gold escort near Eugowra, 23 miles east of Forbes, and robbed the coach of gold and bank-notes of an estimated value of £14,000. The regular gold escort from the Lachlan diggings had departed from Forbes late in the morning on its journey to Sydney. The coach was carrying four policemen of the Western Escort, given the task of providing safe passage for a considerable amount of money and gold. At about five o’clock in the afternoon, just under three miles north-east of Eugowra, the coach came across two drays and their teams which were blocking the road, forcing the coach-driver, John Fagan, to slow the horses to a walk in order to pass close to a large rock beside the road. As it passed, the coach was fired upon by a group of eight men who had been concealed behind the large rock and others in the vicinity. The bushrangers were dressed in "red serge shirts, and red nightcaps, with faces blackened". They fired at the driver and policemen in successive volleys, displaying considerable discipline and precision in their actions; as soon as the first group delivered their fire, they fell back to be replaced with the second group. When the gunfire began Fagan jumped off the coach still holding the reins. Several of the escort were wounded in the volleys of gunfire: Sergeant Condell in the box with the driver was hit in his side and Senior-sergeant Moran received a bullet in the groin. The policemen returned fire, but in the exchange of gunfire one or more of the coach horses were struck, causing them to bolt and the vehicle to capsize as the wheels struck broken rocks. When the coach overturned, the bushrangers "began to cheer and rushed down pell mell to secure their booty". The driver and men of the escort scattered into the surrounding bush; "the law of self-preservation came into operation, for every man sought cover from the fire". The outlaws loaded two of the coach horses with the strongboxes and mail-bags and departed. The total plunder stolen from the coach was 2,719 ounces of gold and £3,700 in cash. Sergeant Condell later reported that, as the bushrangers were firing at the coach, they were commanded by one man, "who gave them orders to fire and load" in a voice the policeman recognised as that of Frank Gardiner. The other members of Gardiner's gang, later identified as being involved in the robbery, were Johnny Gilbert, John Bow, Alex Fordyce, Henry Manns (alias Turner), Dan Charters, Ben Hall, and John O’Meally.

Members of the escort made their way to a nearby pastoral station and word was sent to Forbes reporting the robbery. A party of mounted police and volunteers, with two Aboriginal trackers, under the command of Frederick Pottinger, Inspector of Police at Forbes, arrived at the scene in the early hours of Monday morning. The empty boxes and mail-bags were found about four miles from the scene of the robbery, as well as the remains of a camp-fire and the tracks of ten horses. After retrieving the mail-bags the coach continued on its way, with Condell and Moran, both wounded, and Constable Haviland, who had escaped injury. The coach picked up several passengers along the way and arrived at Orange towards evening; as it was travelling through the township a shot was fired inside the passenger compartment of the coach. A revolver had discharged and the bullet entered beneath Constable Haviland's chin, killing him instantly. Moran's wound had prevented him from wearing his gun-belt so Haviland had been looking after his revolver, which he had stowed under the seat. The inquest into Haviland's death and what led to the tragedy was inconclusive, though probably he had reached down to retrieve Moran's loaded weapon when it accidentally discharged with fatal consequences.

The colonial government promptly offered a reward for information regarding “the band of armed men, said to be ten in number” who robbed “the Gold Escort from the Lachlan”. A notification dated 17 June 1862 announced that a reward of £100 would be paid for information leading to the apprehension and conviction of “each of the guilty parties” (to £1,000 in total). For any accomplice to the robbery who would give such information, a pardon was offered.

=== The hunt ===
A party of troopers under Senior-sergeant Sanderson began a search for the gold escort robbers the next day. On Thursday, June 19, Sanderson stopped at Ben Hall's house near Wheogo Hill, about 20 miles north-west of Grenfell. With nobody at home, Sanderson was leaving when he saw a rider coming from the hill, heading towards Hall's or nearby Maguire's house. As the rider drew closer the man could see they were police and immediately turned and rode away at full gallop. They followed his tracks to Wheogo Hill where they found the tracks of four others who had recently decamped. With the assistance of the Aboriginal tracker, Hastings, the troopers followed the bushranger's tracks for about twenty-five miles. Finding themselves "so hotly pursued" the outlaws let their pack-horse go, enabling them to escape. The policemen found strapped to the pack-horse about 1,500 ounces of gold, a police cloak and two breech-loading carbines, all of which had been stolen from the gold escort coach. Sanderson's party followed one set of tracks for about nine miles from where the packhorse was found, which led them past John Nowlan's station to the vicinity of John O’Meally's place near the Weddin Ranges. On nightfall the troopers met Alex Fordyce on horseback, who said he had come from O’Meally's and was on his way to Nowlan's.

In the meantime Pottinger and a party of police and volunteers were following the tracks of five riders and two pack horses, who had followed the stock-route to the Murrumbidgee River near Narrandera, and were following the river downstream. It was believed Gardiner was one of the men being pursued. Pottinger followed the trail to Hay, on the lower Murrumbidgee, before turning back, convinced that Gardiner and his companions had turned south and crossed into Victoria. By this time only two riders remained in Pottinger's party: Sergeant Lyons and Richard B. Mitchell, the Clerk of Petty Sessions at Forbes. On July 7 near 'Mirrool' station, north-east of Narrandera, they met three young men on the road, leading a pack-horse. When Pottinger began asking questions of the men, one of them suddenly dug his spurs into his horse's flanks and galloped away into the surrounding bush. At this, Pottinger and Mitchell drew their pistols and ordered the remaining two men "to stand". A search of the pack-horse revealed 242 ounces of gold in a flour bag, and one of the men had £135 in bank-notes in his possession. The next morning Pottinger and his men continued on the road to Forbes with their two captives.

Unbeknownst to Pottinger at that stage, his captives' names were Charles Gilbert and Henry Manns (one of the escort robbers). The man who got away was John Gilbert, another of the escort robbers and brother of Charles. After his escape, Gilbert rode hard for the Weddin Mountains to gather a party to rescue his brother and Manns. The gang gathered weapons, mounted fresh horses and rode through the night to Sproule's ‘Timoola’ station, where Gilbert judged they were ahead of the police and their prisoners. The bushrangers secured two women and a couple of travellers at the station and waited for the police to arrive. As Pottinger's party, with their captives, approached 'Timoola' homestead, with Sergeant Lyons in the lead, three or four men suddenly rushed from the dense scrub beside the road. The men had blackened faces and red caps, “each armed with a double-barrelled gun and a brace of revolvers”. They called out "bail up" and began firing. Pottinger and Mitchell, in the rear, were set upon by three others, similarly attired. Lyons’ horse was struck by a ball and reared up, unseating the rider, and galloped into the bush with Lyons' revolver attached to the saddle. Three men rushed forward and released the prisoners. Pottinger and Mitchell returned fire, but against overwhelming odds and disciplined gunfire from the bushrangers, they began to retreat back along the road. With their ammunition "all but expended" Pottinger and Mitchell galloped back to the station they had left earlier, in possession of the recovered gold. The bushrangers had been temporary restrained from pursuing them; their horses, tied to a nearby paling fence, had taken fright during the gunfight and ran off into the bush. By the time they returned to 'Timoola' that evening, the bushrangers were long gone. They were heartened to find that Lyons had managed to escape into the bush and was uninjured.

On July 27 Pottinger led a party of troopers who went to the Wheogo district and apprehended Maguire and Dan Charters at Maguire's place, and also Ben Hall and his brother William at Ben Hall's place (half a mile distant from Maguire's). Another man, John Brown, was also apprehended at another locality in the district. At the Forbes Police Court on Tuesday, 5 August 1862, the four men from the Wheogo district, Ben Hall, John Maguire, John Brown and Daniel Charters, together with William Hall (Ben's older brother, described as a miner from Forbes), were brought before the court on suspicion of being involved in the escort robbery near Eugowra. Police Inspector Pottinger asked that the prisoners be remanded to await the appearance of a witness to identify bank-notes found in possession of one of their number and claimed by William Hall as his property. Pottinger opposed bail for all, with the exception of Charters "of whom he had nothing to say". Charters was allowed bail of £500, with two sureties of £250 each, to appear when called upon. The other prisoners were remanded in custody for a further seven days. Charters became an informant, hoping to receive a full pardon. He named the participants in the gold escort robbery, but did not implicate Ben Hall or John O’Meally. Hall was granted bail in late August of £500 and two sureties of £250.

In mid-August Senior-sergeant Sanderson returned to the Weddin Ranges district and arrested Fordyce at O’Meally's. John Bow was arrested by Pottinger on August 21. John Bow and Alexander Fordyce (charged with the escort robbery) and O’Meally and Maguire (charged with being accessories) were brought up at the Forbes Police Court on Monday, 22 September 1862, and remanded in custody. On November 27 Maguire, Fordyce and Bow were charged “with being concerned in the escort robbery” and committed to stand trial. On 1 December 1862 Henry Manns was apprehended at Murrumburrah by Constable Moore “on suspicion of highway robbery”. Inspector Pottinger, who happened to be nearby at Lambing Flat, identified Manns a day or two later as one of those forcibly released from his custody near ‘Timoola’ station in July.

A 'Special Criminal Commission' was held in February 1863 at the Sydney Criminal Court in Darlinghurst to try the four accused gold escort robbers, John Bow, Alexander Fordyce, Henry Manns and John Maguire. After a trial that lasted four days, on Thursday, 26 February 1863, a jury found Maguire not guilty. However, the other three – Fordyce, Bow and Manns – were found guilty of feloniously wounding Sergeant Condell immediately prior to the robbery near Eugowra. Each were sentenced to death, but after petitions pleading for reprieves, the sentences of John Bow and Alex Fordyce were commuted to life with hard labour on the roads, the first three years “in irons”. The pleas for Henry Manns were in vain; he was hanged at Darlinghurst Gaol on 26 March 1863.

== Description ==
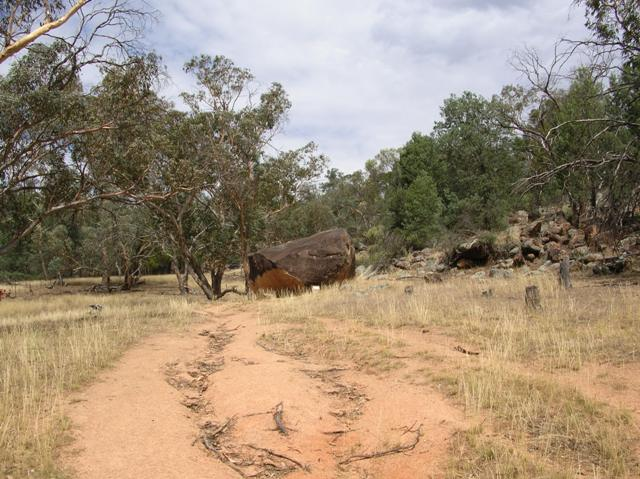
Escort Rock with the old coach road in the foreground

Escort Rock is located approximately four kilometres north east of Eugowra on the Escort Way. The site is located 200 metres to the east of the Escort Way on the site of the old road. A large boulder has been marked "Escort Rock" and is set to the side of what was once the coach road from Eugowra to Orange. The original coach road wound around the base of the boulder strewn hillside and then after a sharp bend curved back towards the existing road. The evidence of the original road is the only physical evidence to show where the robbery took place.

As at 3 July 2009, it was in good condition, and the original coach road was visible.

The integrity of the rock, coach road, and surrounding area is high, mainly due to the new road being built 200m away from the original road.

There is a picnic area next to the highway that has been constructed for tourists to stop and see the site. There is also a plaque which commemorates a re-enactment which took place on the centenary of the hold up by the Gardiner gang.

== Heritage listing ==
Escort Rock contributes to the State significance of the Ben Hall Sites as the site of the first crime Hall can be positively linked to. The activities of Hall and his gang had significant impact on the movement of people, money and gold through regional New South Wales between 1862 and 1865. The Escort Rock robbery was the first of many road side hold-ups and it was the increasing frequency of such hold-ups which lead to the widespread expansion of police forces into rural areas and increased security for mail coaches and gold escorts.

Escort Rock is associated with the bushranger Frank Gardiner, who lead the robbery on 15 June 1862. Hall's association with Gardiner played an important role in Hall becoming a notorious bushranger.

Escort Rock contributes to the State significance of the Ben Hall Sites as a site recognised by the public to be associated with Ben Hall. Hall is one of the best known bushrangers who operated in New South Wales and forms a significant element to the construction of Australian identity. The Escort Rock site is well marked and is a popular tourist destination.

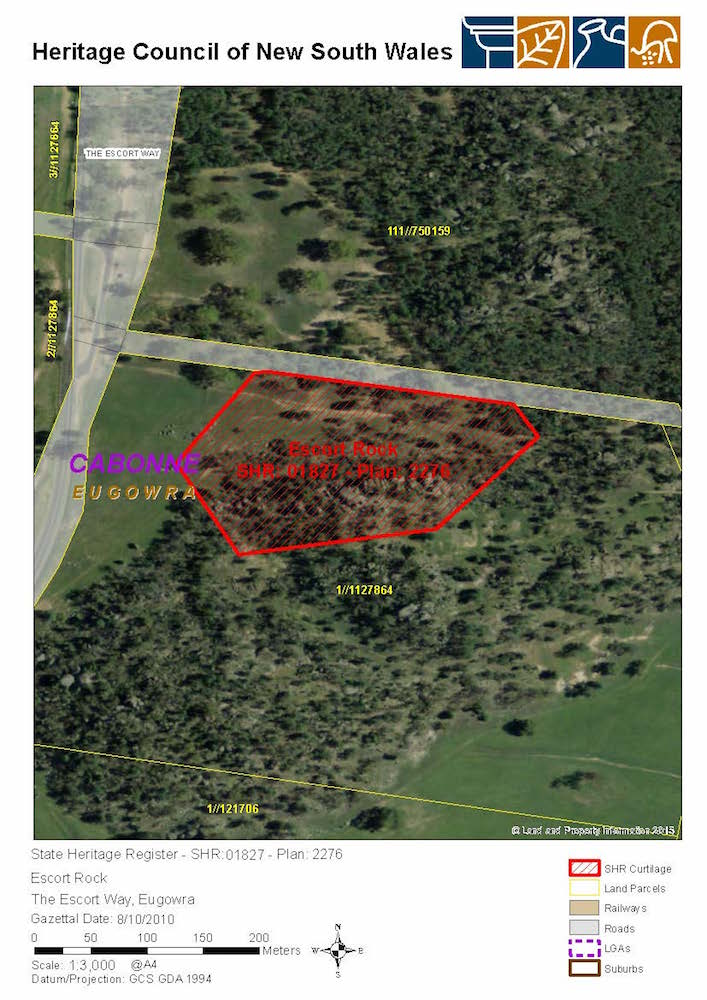
Heritage boundaries

Escort Rock is of State significance as being representative of the type of places used by bushrangers to hold up coaches and travellers. Escort Rock is an example of the type of place Ben Hall and his gang used for road side hold ups and which helped define these criminal activities as "bushranging" due to the men appearing out of the bush on horse back and then escaping into the bush with the proceeds of the robbery. Escort Rock is an identifiable location of a highway robbery. The majority of roadside robberies took place at locations without relocatable landmarks.

Aesthetically Escort Rock is of local significance as an impressive landmark on the Old Coach Road from Eugowra to Orange. This road is no longer used for traffic, a new road being built 200m away.

The Ben Hall Sites - Escort Rock was listed on the New South Wales State Heritage Register on 8 October 2010 having satisfied the following criteria.

The place is important in demonstrating the course, or pattern, of cultural or natural history in New South Wales.

The activities of Hall and his gang had significant impact on the movement of people, money and gold through regional New South Wales between 1862 and 1865. Escort Rock became one of many road side hold-ups. The increasing frequency of hold-ups lead to the widespread expansion of police forces into rural areas and increased security for mail coaches and gold escorts. Aboriginal people with their skill at tracking and their intimate knowledge of the bush were employed in order to help the police match the local knowledge of the bushrangers.

The place has a strong or special association with a person, or group of persons, of importance of cultural or natural history of New South Wales's history.

Escort Rock contributes to the State significance of the Ben Hall Sites as the first major crime Ben Hall participated in. Hall went on to have a bushranging career that lasted until 1865.

Escort Rock is associated with the bushranger Frank Gardiner, who lead the robbery. Halls association with Gardiner played an important role in Hall becoming the notorious bushranger he was to destined become.

The place is important in demonstrating aesthetic characteristics and/or a high degree of creative or technical achievement in New South Wales.

Aesthetically Escort Rock is of local significance as an impressive landmark on the road from Eugowra to Orange.

The place has strong or special association with a particular community or cultural group in New South Wales for social, cultural or spiritual reasons.

Escort Rock contributes to the State significance of the Ben Hall Sites as a site recognised by the public to be associated with Ben Hall. Hall is one of the best known bushrangers who operated in New South Wales and forms a significant element to the construction of Australian identity. The Escort Rock site is well marked and is a popular tourist destination.

The place has potential to yield information that will contribute to an understanding of the cultural or natural history of New South Wales.

The original old coach road is partially visible and archaeological research would reveal more about its original route.

The place possesses uncommon, rare or endangered aspects of the cultural or natural history of New South Wales.

Escort Rock is unusual as an easily recognisable and well documented place where a road side hold up by bushrangers took place.

The place is important in demonstrating the principal characteristics of a class of cultural or natural places/environments in New South Wales.

Escort Rock is of State significance as being representative of the type of places used by bushrangers to hold up coaches and travellers. Escort rock is an example of the type of place Ben Hall and his gang used for road side hold ups and which helped define these criminal activities as "bushranging" due to the men appearing out of the bush on horse back and then escapinging into the bush with the proceeds of the robbery. Escort Rock is an identifiable location of a highway robbery. The majority of robberies took place at locations without relocatable landmarks.
