= Goobang (Ashburnham County parish) =

Goobang, New South Wales
- Town
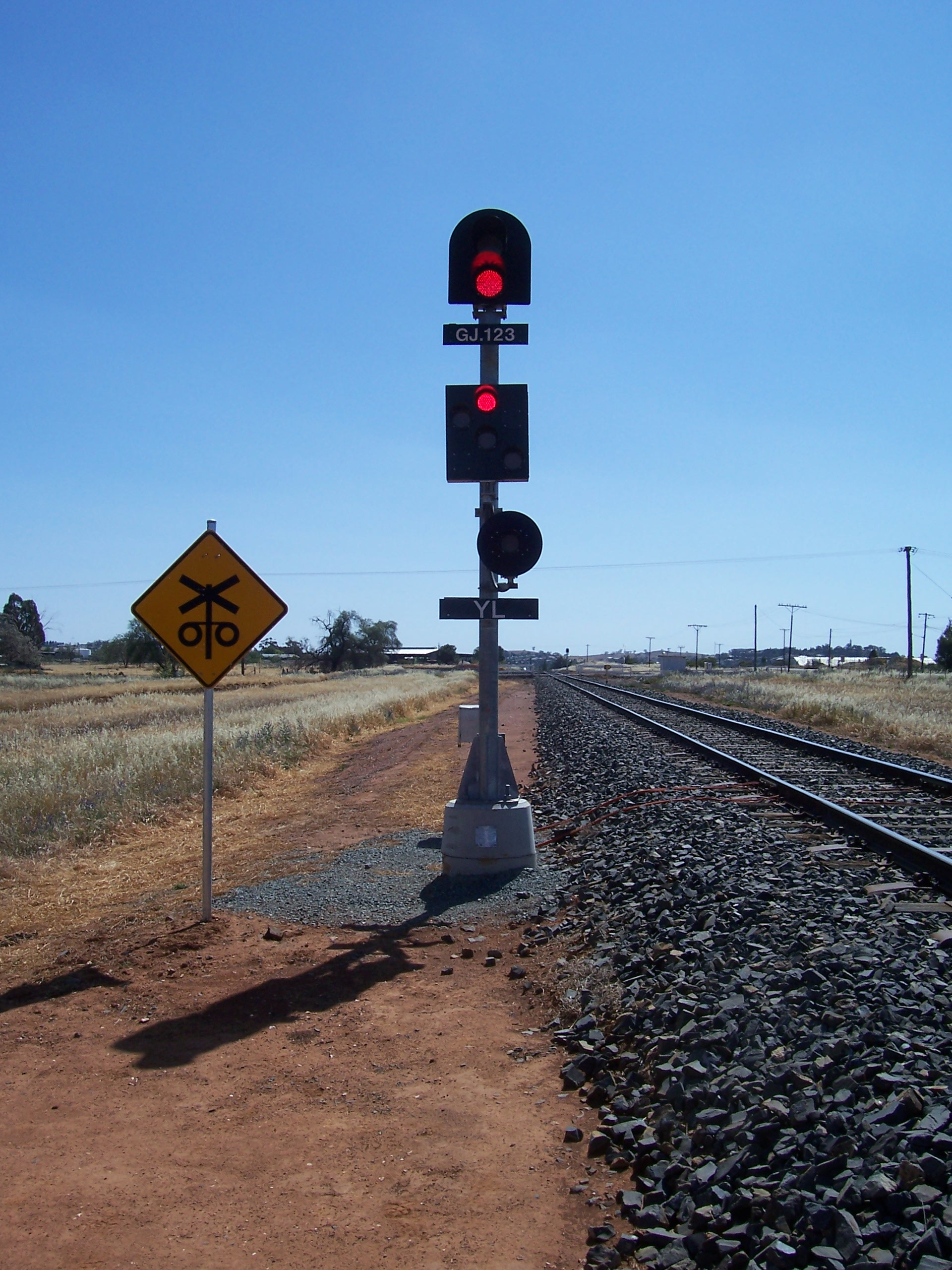
- Goobang, NSW

- Coordinates: 32°56′0″S 148°14′32″E
- Country: Australia
- State: New South Wales
- LGA: Parkes Shire
- Location: 382 km (237 mi) WNW of Sydney; 97 km (60 mi) SW of Dubbo; 24 km (15 mi) N of Parkes

Government
  - State electorate: Dubbo
  - Federal division: Calare
- Postcode: 2870

Goobang is a bounded rural locality, and cadastral parish in Parkes Shire in the Central West region of New South Wales, Australia, and is about 300km west-northwest of NSW's capital city of Sydney, and is on the Goobang Creek.

Prior to European settlement, the Goobang area was inhabited by the Wiradjuri people. Major Thomas Mitchell and John Oxley were early explorers in the area. The area was first opened up in the 19th century Gold rush of western New South Wales. Today the main economic activity is wheat and sheep.

Goobang is a rail junction for the Parkes–Narromine and Broken Hill railway lines.
