= Ben Hall (bushranger) =

Australian bushranger (1837–1865)

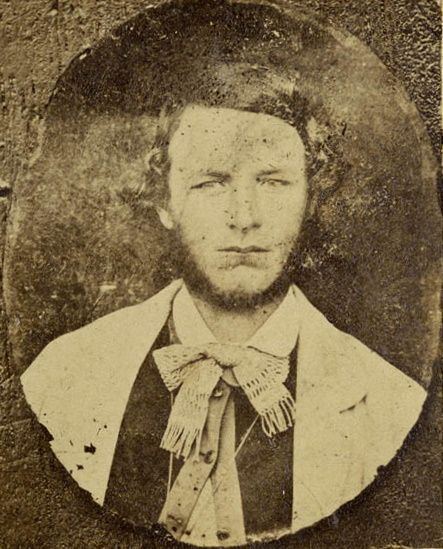
- Ben Hall in 1863
- Born: Ben Hall Jr. 9 May 1837; Wallis Plains, Maitland, New South Wales, Australia
- Died: 5 May 1865 (aged 27); Goobang Creek, New South Wales, Australia
- Resting place: Forbes, New South Wales, Australia
- Occupation: Bushranger
- Children: 1

Ben Hall (9 May 1837 – 5 May 1865) was an Australian bushranger and leading member of the Gardiner–Hall gang. He and his associates carried out many raids across New South Wales, from Bathurst to Forbes, south to Gundagai and east to Goulburn. Unlike many bushrangers of the era, Hall was not directly responsible for any deaths, although several of his associates were. He was shot dead by police in May 1865 at Goobang Creek. The police claimed that they were acting under the protection of the Felons Apprehension Act 1865, which allowed any bushranger who had been specifically named under the terms of the Act to be shot, and killed by any person at any time without warning. At the time of Hall's death, the Act had not yet come into force, resulting in controversy over the legality of his killing.

Hall is a prominent figure in Australian folklore, inspiring many bush ballads, books and screen works, including the 1975 television series Ben Hall and the 2016 feature film The Legend of Ben Hall.

== Early life ==
Ben Hall was born on 9 May 1837, at Maitland, New South Wales, Australia (though an 1865 newspaper report, possibly incorrectly, named the Clift family-owned Breeza Station near Breeza as his birthplace). Both of Ben's parents were convicted for minor stealing offences and transported to New South Wales, and first met each other as convicts. Benjamin received his ticket of leave in August 1832, but it wasn't until 1834 that Eliza was granted her freedom. They were married the same year and moved to the Hunter Region. The couple had numerous children; Ben Junior was the fourth child and third son.

Benjamin Senior found work as overseer on the Doona run near Murrurundi, as an employee of Samuel Clift, while Eliza was employed as a domestic worker at Clift's home in Wallis Plains, East Maitland. Following a severe drought in 1838–39, Clift had to move all his stock back to the Hunter, so Benjamin lost his position at Doona. However, during his time working in that area, he had discovered an isolated valley north of Murrurundi with permanent water and good grazing. Here Benjamin built a rough hut, and began collecting any wild cattle and horses he could find in the hills. Then in mid-1842, he bought a small block of land in the newly created village of Murrurundi, where he established a butcher shop and also sold fresh vegetables.

About the end of 1850, Benjamin Sr. moved down to the Lachlan River area, taking with him the children Ben Jr., William, Mary and his stepson Thomas Wade. It appears that Ben Jr. never returned to Murrurundi, although his father did in 1851. Young Ben spent his early years working with horses and cattle, developing his expertise in stockwork and bushcraft, skills which would later serve him well.

In 1856, at the age of 19, Ben married Bridget Walsh (1841–1923) at Bathurst. Kitty, one of Bridget's sisters, was married to a Wheogo stockman named John Brown, but in 1862 she became the mistress of Frank Gardiner and eloped to Queensland; another Walsh sister Ellen married John Maguire. On 7 August 1859, Ben and Biddy (as she was called) had a son, who they named Henry. In 1859–60, Hall and John Maguire jointly leased the "Sandy Creek" run of 10,000 acres (40 km²) about 50 km south of Forbes.

== Bushranger ==
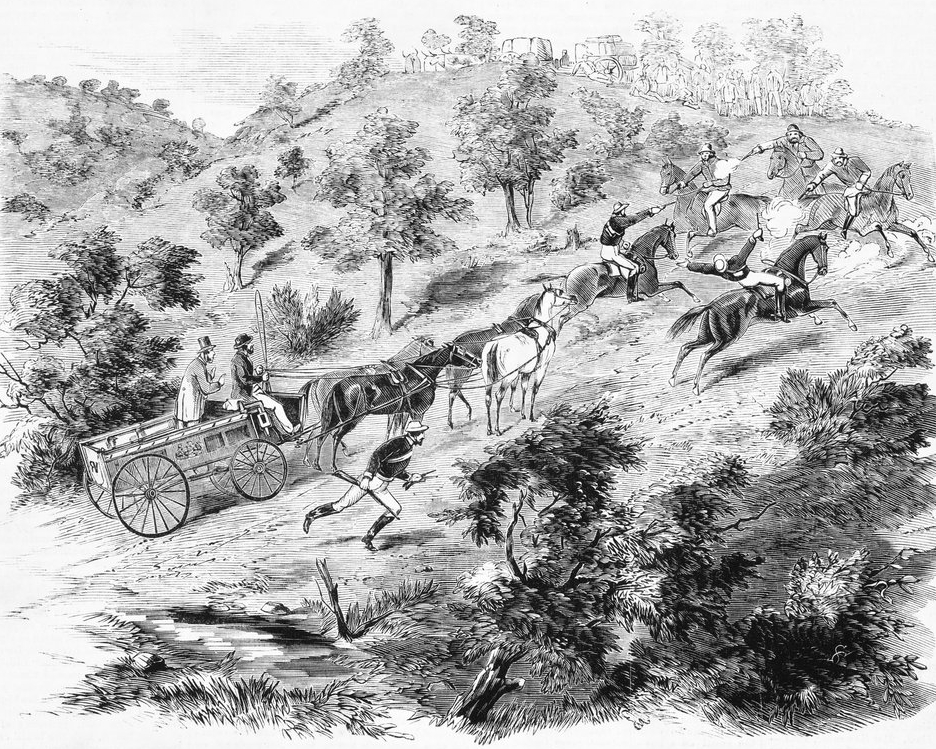
Hall, John Gilbert and John Dunn attack policemen guarding the Gundagai Mail, 1865

During the summer of 1861–62, his wife Biddy left with their young son Henry to live with a young police officer named James Taylor. They moved to Humbug Creek, near Lake Cowal, well away from Hall. Hall soon began a disastrous association with the notorious bushranger Frank Christie, alias Gardiner. In April 1862, Ben was arrested by Inspector Sir Frederick Pottinger for participating in the armed robbery of Bill Bacon's drays near Forbes. Hall was identified as having been in the company of Gardiner during the robbery, and two other men, names unknown. The charge was dismissed when one of the Crown witnesses changed his testimony.

Shortly afterwards, on 15 June 1862, Gardiner led a gang of eight men, including Hall, in robbing the gold escort coach near Eugowra, New South Wales (at what is now known as Escort Rock), of banknotes and 2700 ounces of gold worth more than 14,000 pounds. Hall and several others were arrested in July, but once again the police were unable to gain enough evidence to formally charge him. He was released about the end of August. However, he and his partner at Sandy Creek faced mounting legal costs and were forced to transfer the lease of the property to John Wilson, a Forbes publican.

Estranged from his wife and young son, and with the property gone, Hall for several months drifted around the Weddin-Wheogo area, associating with numerous undesirable characters including John O'Meally, Johnny Gilbert, and Patsy Daley. After several confrontations with the police, culminating in Pottinger's decision to burn down Hall's hut at Sandy Creek, Hall gradually drifted into a life of crime.

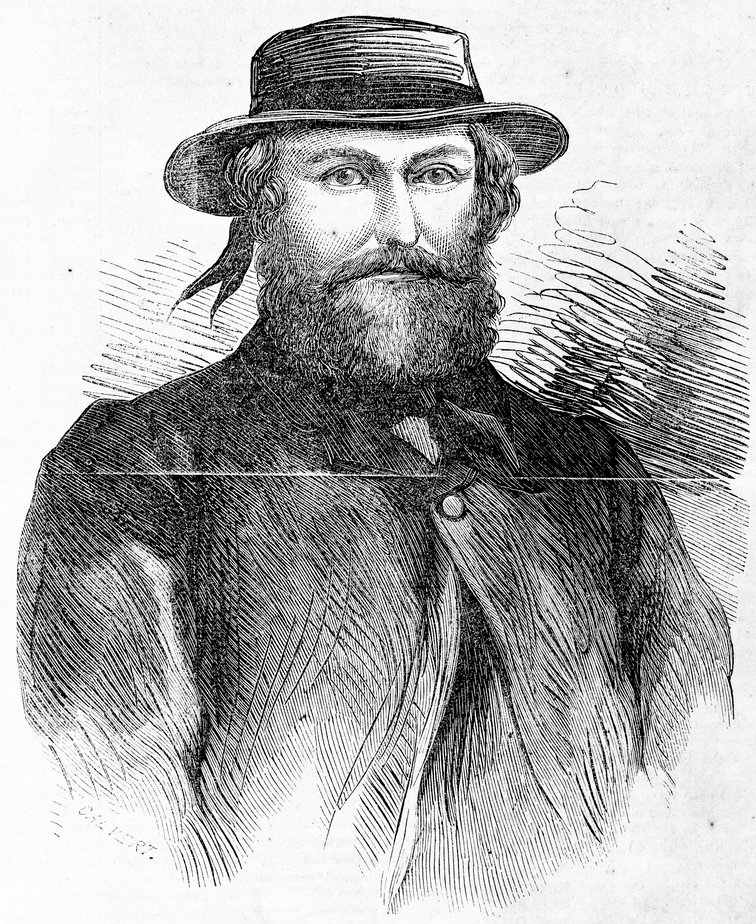
Portrait of Hall, 1865

In one instance, Hall and his gang bailed up Robinson's Hotel in Canowindra, New South Wales. All travellers and the townspeople were required to remain at the hotel, but they were not mistreated and were provided with food and entertainment. The local policeman was subjected to some humiliation by being locked in his own cell. When the hostages were set free, the gang insisted on paying the hotelier and giving the townspeople "expenses". Their aim was to emphasise that the gang could act with impunity and to belittle the police. In this they were spectacularly successful.

Shortly afterwards, the gang raided the town of Bathurst followed a few days later by another takeover of Canowindra, this time for three days. Their cavalier activities were soon brought to a sudden halt however, when Micky Burke was killed at Dunns Plains, John Vane surrendered to the police and O'Meally was shot dead in an attack on Goimbla station, near Eugowra. The gang of five had been reduced to just two – Hall and Gilbert.

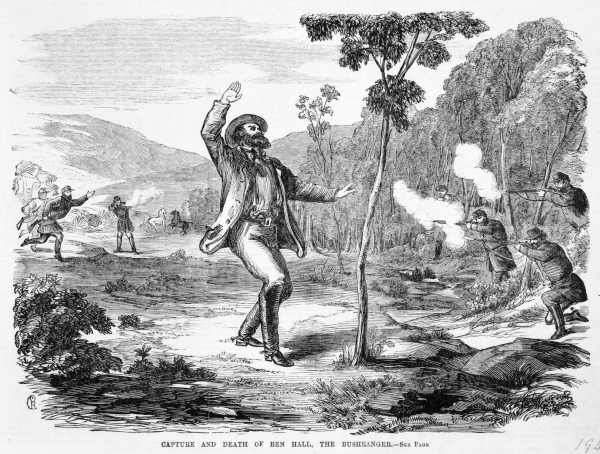
Death of Hall

During 1864 Hall continued his life on the roads with various companions, including Gilbert, Dunleavy and the Old Man, James Gordon. Finally the gang consisted of Hall, Gilbert and John Dunn. In November 1864, during the robbery of a mail coach at Black Springs Creek near Jugiong, John Gilbert shot and killed Sgt. Parry. Then in January 1865, Constable Nelson was shot and killed by John Dunn when the gang raided a hotel in Collector (now the Bushranger Hotel). Finally, in early 1865, the authorities finally undertook legislation to bring an end to the careers of the three. The Felons Apprehension Act was pushed through the Parliament of New South Wales for the specific purpose of declaring Hall and his comrades outlaws, meaning that they would be "outside the law" and could be killed by anyone at any time without warning.

From 1863 to 1865, over 100 robberies are attributed to Hall and his various associates, making them some of the most prolific bushrangers in the period of bushranging in the colony. These included the holding up of several villages, dozens of mail coach robberies and the regular theft of prized racehorses.

In May 1865, Hall and the others realised that to survive they would have to leave New South Wales. They first retreated to an isolated area on the Goobang Creek, northwest of Forbes, intending to gather fresh horses and provisions for a long journey northwards. Their whereabouts were reported to the police by 'Goobang Mick' Coneley, a man who had earlier promised to give the gang assistance and protection. In late April, Hall temporarily separated from his companions, intending to meet them again a few days later at the Goobang Creek. But this time there were police waiting, hidden in the bush. At dawn on 5 May, Hall was ambushed by eight well-armed policemen who shot him at least thirty times as he attempted to run away. He fell and, as he held himself up by a sapling, cried, "I am wounded; shoot me dead." He died seconds later.

== Legacy ==
=== Memorials ===
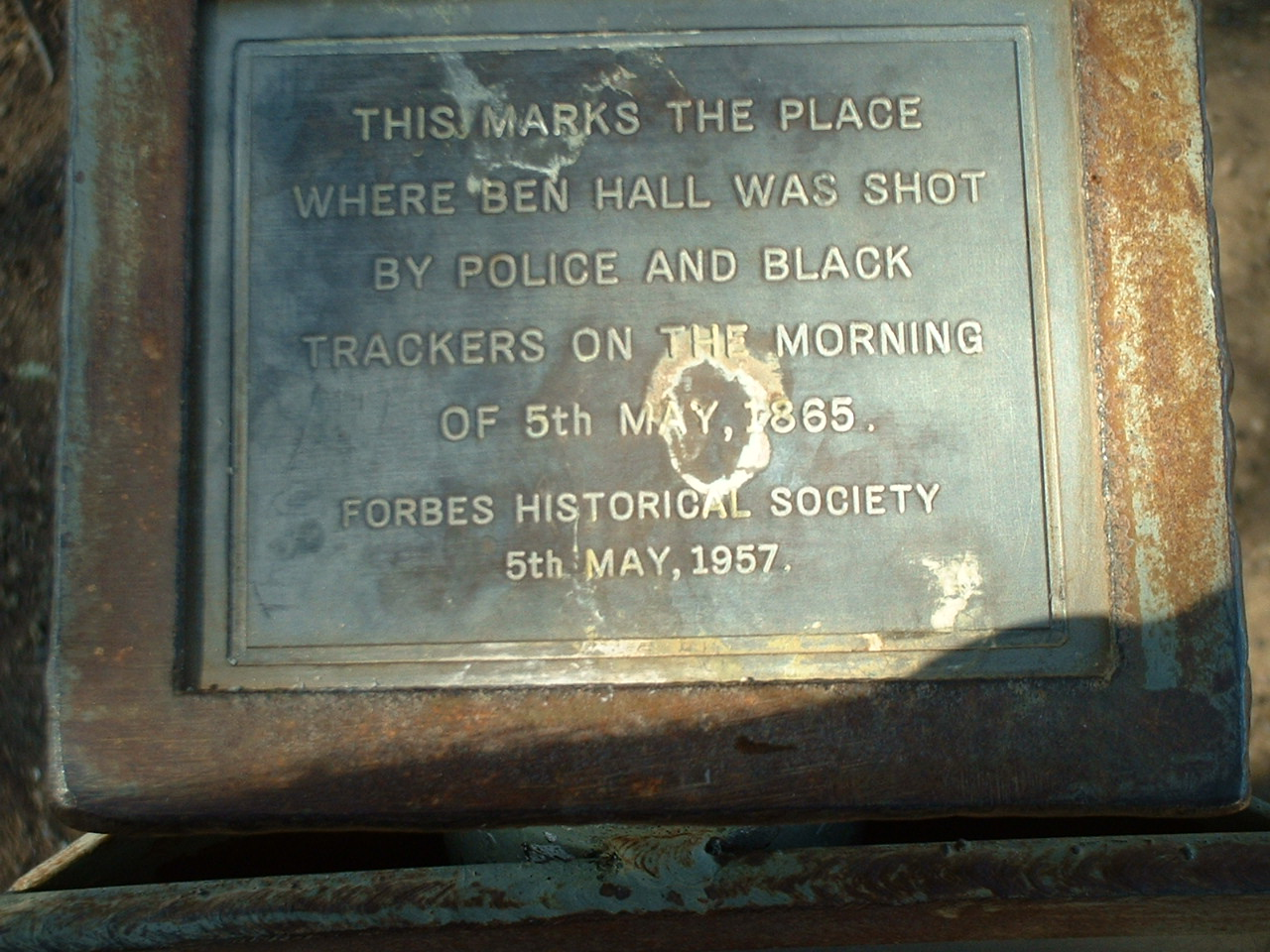
Plaque dated 5 May 1957: "This marks the place where Ben Hall was shot by police and black trackers on the morning of 5th May, 1865."

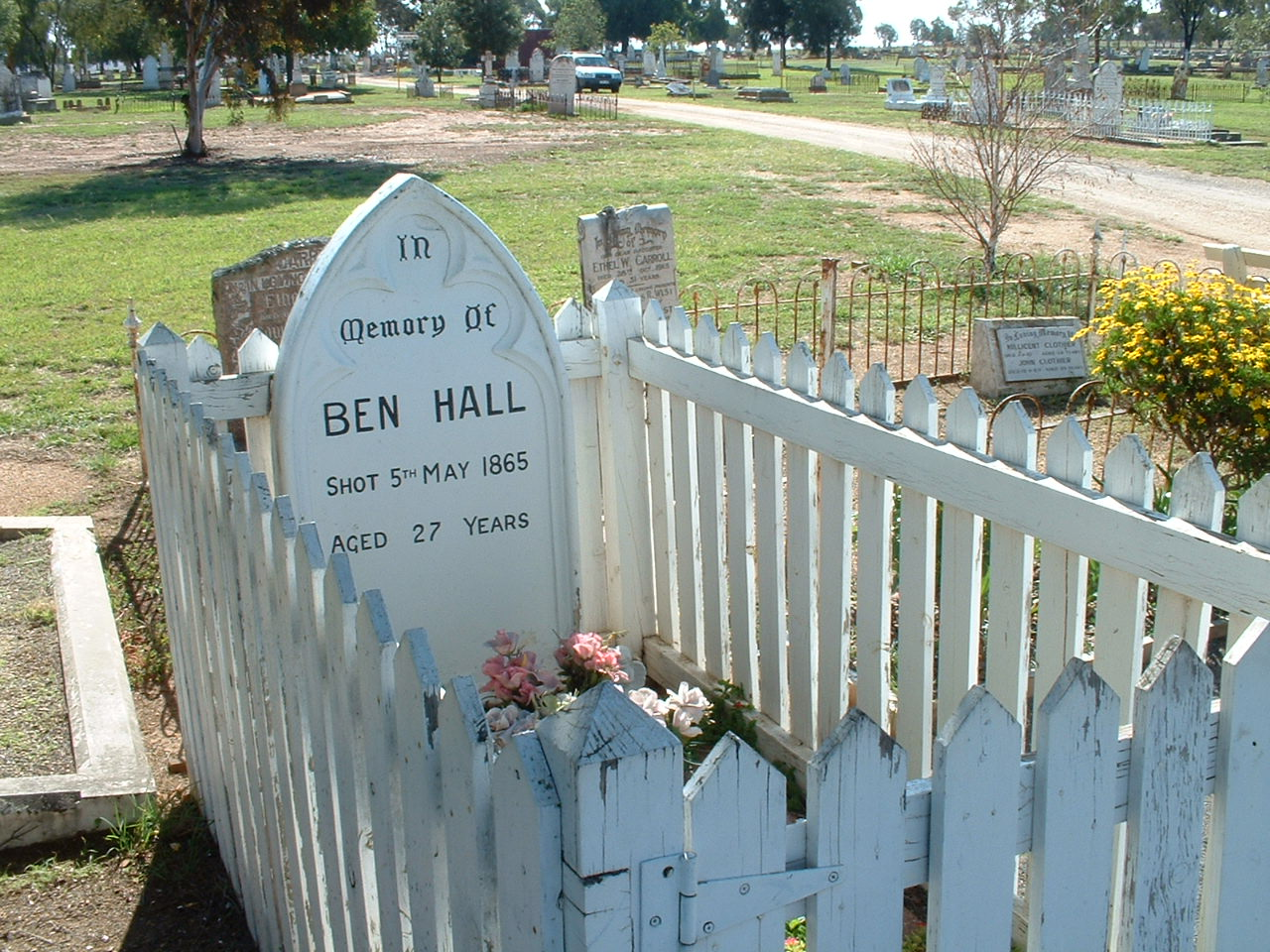
Ben Hall's grave in the Forbes cemetery

Hall's body was taken back to Forbes where an inquest was held by the police magistrate. He was buried in the Forbes cemetery on Sunday 7 May 1865. A headstone was erected in the 1920s.

On 5 May 1957, the Forbes Historical Society dedicated a plaque at Goobang Creek, where Hall had been shot. There is a cave in an isolated section of the Weddin Range, near Grenfell, that is known as Ben Hall's Cave. A memorial called Ben Hall's Wall is located in Breeza, south of Gunnedah, New South Wales. Ben Halls Gap is a small section of State Forest named after the bushranger's father, and is located south of Nundle, New South Wales.

There is a plaque on the roadside, close to Escort Rock, where Frank Gardiner's gang (including Hall), robbed the gold escort on 15 June 1862. The plaque was erected to mark the centenary of the robbery.

There is a historical marker, on the old mountain road between Araluen and Majors Creek, where Hall and his gang made a surprise attack, while attempting to rob the Araluen gold escort on 13 March 1865, during which Constable John Kelly was seriously wounded. The driver, John Blatchford, was slightly wounded, but was able to run downhill toward Araluen, to summon assistance. The gold was fearlessly defended by Constable Daniel Byrne. The other two police—Stayplton and Mac Ellicott—dismounted and outflanked the bushrangers, who then escaped empty-handed. The wagonette that was carrying the gold is preserved in the Braidwood Museum.

== Heritage listings ==
A number of sites associated with Ben Hall are now heritage-listed, including:

- Escort Rock at Eugowra, where Frank Gardiner's gang (including Ben Hall) robbed a gold escort on 15 June 1862
- Cliefden in Mandurama, which Ben Hall and his gang raided on 26 September 1863
- Wandi in Marulan where Ben Hall attacked Member of Parliament William Macleay on 19 December 1864
- Bushranger Hotel in Collector where John Dunn killed Constable Nelson on 26 January 1865
- Ben Hall's Death Site at Billabong Creek, Forbes where he died on 5 May 1865
- Grave of Ben Hall in Forbes Cemetery where he was buried on 7 May 1865

== In popular culture ==
=== Poetry ===
The well-known "The Death of Ben Hall" ballad was written by Scottish-Australian bush poet Will H. Ogilvie (1869–1963), as well as penning Ben Hall's stirrup irons.

=== Music ===
A number of folk songs recount Hall's life and exploits. The most notable is "Streets of Forbes" (Roud # 20764), which has been recorded by numerous singers and groups. Others include "The Ballad of Ben Hall's Gang", "The Death of Ben Hall", "The Ghost of Ben Hall" and "Land of Fortune".

=== Film and television ===
- A Tale of the Australian Bush, also known as Ben Hall, the Notorious Bushranger (1911), silent film
- Ben Hall and His Gang (1911), silent film
- Bushranger's Ransom, or A Ride for Life (1911), silent film
- Ben Hall (1975), television series (starring Jon Finch as Ben Hall)
- The Legend of Ben Hall (2016), feature film (starring Jack Martin as Ben Hall)

=== Plays ===
- Hands Up (1893)
- The King of the Road (1900)
- Ransom (1907)

=== Novels ===
- Ben Hall the Bushranger (1947) by Frank Clune

=== Radio ===
- Outlawry Under the Gums (1933)
- A Notorious Bushranger (1951) - radio feature
- The Hot and Copper Sky (1962)

=== Graphic novel ===
Bold Ben Hall written and illustrated by Australian graphic artist Monty Wedd was originally published as a weekly comic feature in Australian Sunday newspapers over a period of seven and a half years from 1977. In 2018, Comicoz published Wedd’s collected episodes in book format, reproduced from the original artwork. The book also includes a history of the comic strip written by Nat Karmichael.

== See also ==
- Gardiner–Hall gang
