= Cliefden, Mandurama =

Cliefden
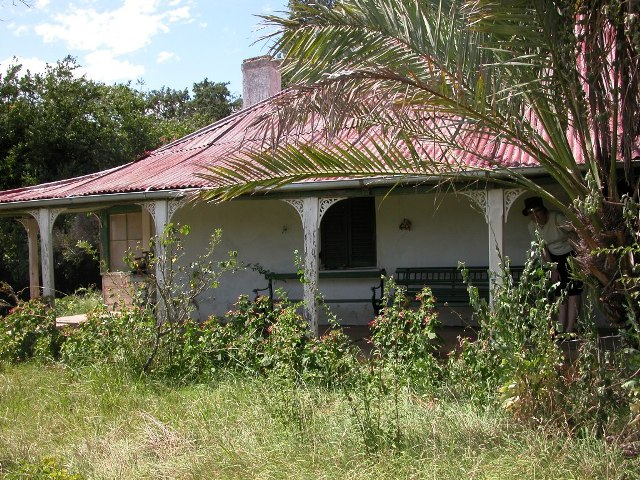
- Northern side of the house showing front verandah and 1840s part of the house

- Location within New South Wales Location within Australia
- 33.6575°S 148.9117°E
- Location: 1521 Belubula Way, Mandurama, Blayney Shire, New South Wales, Australia

History
- Built: 1842–

Site notes
- Owner: David Rothery

New South Wales Heritage Register
- Official name: The Ben Hall Sites - Cliefden; Cleifden Barn
- Type: state heritage (built)
- Designated: 8 October 2010
- Reference no.: 1827
- Type: Homestead Complex
- Category: Farming and Grazing

Cliefden is a heritage-listed homestead at 1521 Belubula Way, Mandurama, in the Central West region of New South Wales, Australia. It is one of a group of historic sites labelled the Ben Hall Sites for their association with bushranger Ben Hall, along with Ben Hall's Death Site, the Bushranger Hotel, Escort Rock, the Grave of Ben Hall and Wandi. It was built from 1842. It was added to the New South Wales State Heritage Register on 8 October 2010.

== History ==
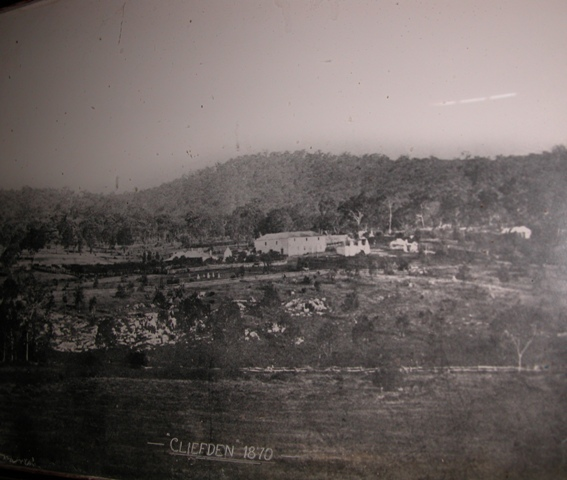
1870 photo shows the graveyard and the scale of the barn and woolshed building

By virtue of orders issued to them by Governor Darling, dated 22 April 1831, Frederick John and William Montagu Rothery obtained grants of 2460 acres (995.6ha) each and chose them 12 miles (19.3 km) west of Coombing on the left bank of Limestone Creek, Portions 1 & 2, Parish of Mallongul. They named them Cliefden Springs and Cliefden respectively, after Cliefden in Buckinghamshire, once the summer retreat and favourite residence of Frederick, Prince of Wales, father of George III to whose entourage, family tradition relates, a Rothery ancestor was attached.

The property Cliefden was taken up by William Montagu Rothery in 1831. William married Fanny Oceania Lockyer and they settled at Cliefden in 1842 where they went on to have 14 children and to take care of 3 of his brothers children. The property has been in the continuous ownership of the Rothery family since 1831.

W. M. Rothery in 1838 held 9824 acres (3975 ha) by grant and purchase with an overseer by the name of Bain and ten assigned convicts. The following year, the number of assigned convicts was sixteen and it is stated that in place of an overseer the property was supervised personally by W. M. Rothery. This could well indicate that the "substantial" house for which 200,000 bricks were contracted to be made (a document signed between W. M. Rothery and convict brick maker John Bedley) in 1838 was occupied that following year.

Rothery was the brother-in-law of Thomas Icely of Coombing Park nearby. The Cliefden Barn and house were constructed between 1838 and 1842. The house originally had at least 26 rooms as well as servants quarters. The building is Old Colonial Georgian in style and is built of bricks manufactured on Cliefden. Rothery raised blood horses, an important aspect of his financial ventures. The Barn contains under one roof the stables, coach house, meat-house, barn and shearing-shed.

The Ben Hall gang, dressed in stolen police uniforms, raided Cliefden on 26 September 1863. The gang were attracted by the renown of William Rothery's horses. The gang spent about three hours mustering horses and putting them through their paces, finally selecting three horses and two saddles. They also helped themselves to a quantity of money, food and a pair of boots.

Hall and his gang made two more visits to Cliefden, the first on 23 June 1864. Hall was upset to discover the Station was well protected, being able only to get away with three horses. As a parting gesture, Hall set fire to a large hay stack and a shed. Cliefden continued to be well protected, and on 29 November the gang returned, only to be frightened away by a party of police who were visiting the house.

Both the homestead and the out-building retain many of their Victorian contents. The carriage which brought the family over the Blue Mountains in 1842 is still in functional condition, although it has been kept in the meat-house section, Rothery horses used the original stalls in the stable section; with shearing still being done, using the slab weather-shed later attached to the brick building, the sheep still use the original slab pens and exits. The Ferrier woolpress (the same make as at Coombing Park) is situated, by itself, in an empty hall. Down in the paddock is an 1830s limekiln which was used during the construction of this complex; it is the oldest limekiln over the Mountains.

== Description ==
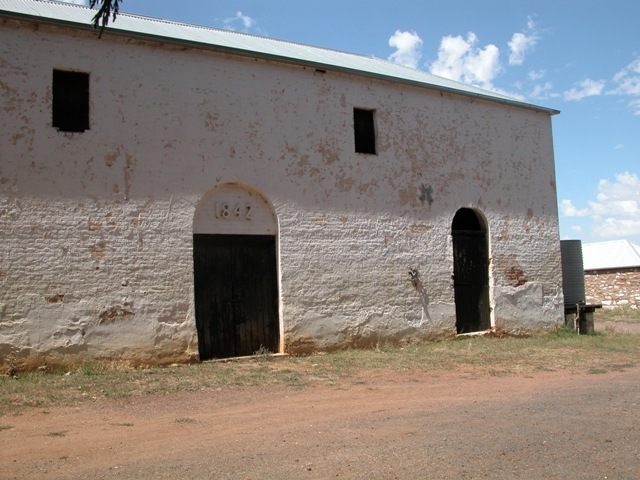
The northern elevation of the barn and woolshed building

The farm homestead complex is within a larger farm, which is not heritage-listed. The homestead complex is located on top of a hill with views to the west, north and east. There is a spectacular view east to Mount Canobolas (which is west of Orange). Other views are available north and west including to Limestone Creek. There is a family cemetery located east of and away from the house that documents the generations of Rotherys that have lived at Cliefden. Three knolls or local high points are to the homestead complex's west, south and south-east (the latter being the highest).

A drive to Belubula Way leads east–west to the homestead, approaching it from the east and south, coming close to its western (rear) side, between the Stables complex and homestead and continuing on to the knoll to the west. A dam is located further south-west. A weir in Limestone Creek is to the homestead's north-west.

A tennis court and shed are to the homestead complex's west.

Evidence of brick making and kilns are also in this direction, between homestead complex and creek to the homestead's north-west. Here is the 1830s limekiln which helped to build this remarkable complex: it is the earliest limekiln over the Mountains.

=== Garden ===
Cliefden's garden has been extensive over time. Evidence of a more formal garden to the homestead's north-east includes curving path layouts and what may have been a formal rose garden. A path parallel to the homestead's eastern (front) facade is also early. A series of photographs from the 1870s show large garden areas to the east and north of the main homestead's eastern (front) frontage. Windbreaks of pine trees (Pinus sp., likely Monterey pine, Pinus radiata) to the house's south-west give it shelter from prevailing south-west winds. Closer to the house are a number of palms, including date palms (Phoenix dactylifera) and Californian desert fan palms (Washingtonia robusta). A large red flowered oleander (Nerium oleander cv.) close to the verandah of the house's eastern (front) facade may date from the 1870s. A line of cypresses is to the east of the homestead. Elsewhere on site tree of heaven (Ailanthus altissima) grows.

=== Homestead ===
A document signed on 6 July 1838 between William Montagu Rothery and convict brick maker John Bedley to make 200,000 bricks "such as are fit to build a Substantial House"... could well be for construction of part of the homestead and also for the imposing two-storey barn which bears the date 1842.

The house was originally constructed as a low brick Colonial Georgian building with wide verandahs and very thick walls. It grew incrementally over time as the number of children in the family increased and the property came under threat of bushrangers.

The main facade of the north-facing homestead consists of a delightful section of three rooms which open through four pairs of shuttered French doors to the verandah. A second section with two smaller solid-shuttered windows also shaded by a verandah adjoins the verandah of the main section in a way that suggests two different periods of building.

The central room in the main section is the former dining room, approximately 14' x 18' (4.3 x 5.5m) with two pairs of French doors and a (red) cedar mantelpiece of Georgian design. In this section the 6' (1.8m) high doors are six-panelled in the Georgian manner. Towards the rear of the house are the charming drawing room with paintings of the Nile, Istanbul and Sydney Harbour, by Nicholas Rothery who was the father of the original settler, William Montagu Rothery. More recently the courtyard area between the front section, the drawing room wing and the dining-kitchen block has been enclosed.

The new rooms were arranged around a central courtyard to its south, enclosing the original 1842 structure and the kitchen further south. When Cliefden came under threat, horses could be brought into the courtyard area for protection. A special slot was built into the wall next to the western entry to make it possible to fire a weapon at someone approaching without being shot.

A wing to the east, another two wings south of this forms the courtyard's eastern side. A Dining room and kitchen to the courtyard's south form that boundary. Two more rooms north of that form a western courtyard "wall".

In the interwar years (c. 1920s/30s) the courtyard space was roofed over. c. 1870 there is a reference to a homestead "of 29 rooms" which is more than remain today.

Original shingle roofing remains inside the current roofing in corrugated iron. Box gutters drain much of the roofs.

=== Outbuildings ===
==== Stables/Coach House/Meat-House/Barn & Shearing Shed ====
There is an interesting symmetry about the placing along a major axis of the main section of the white-stuccoed homestead, the handsome two-storied white-washed brick barn and the adjoining woolshed which is a low timber addition.

Close to and south of the homestead is a large two storey Colonial Georgian barn and woolshed. The bricks were manufactured on Cliefden - in a location noted above. A distinctive triple hipped roof (clad with corrugated iron) reflects the internal division of the building into stables, classing tables and wool room. This huge square brick building was erected between 1838 and 1842 by William Rothery and contains under one roof the stables, coach house, meat-house, barn and shearing-shed.

The barn presents an impressive facade which separates house from woolshed. The ground floor of the barn is divided into three main functional areas - stables for working and "blood" horses, wool rooms for classing and storage, and a butcher's shop. The upper floor accessible by a vertical ladder, is divided into three major storage areas.

The actual shearing area is housed in a lower timber-framed structure adjacent to the above square brick building's south. Shearing still takes place in these buildings. Shearing-sheds are not always freestanding.

The Ferrier wool press (the same make as the press at Coombing Park) stands in its own empty hall, dominating the space.

East of the Stables complex is a garage. South of this are holding pens and a sheep run, which connects to the timber framed shearing area/shed.

=== Woolshed/shearing area ===
Adjacent to the barn, a low timber addition.

=== Contents Collection ===
Cliefden is still occupied by the three granddaughters of William Rothery, who was the brother-in-law of Thomas Icely of Coombing Park near Carcoar, and both the homestead and the out-building retain many of their Victorian contents.

The phaeton carriage which brought the family over the Blue Mountains in 1842 is still in good order, though kept in the meat-house section; until a year or two ago, Rothery horses used the original stalls in the stable section; and shearing still goes on today, using the slab weather-shed later attached to the brick building, with the sheep still using the original slab pens and exits.

=== Boot makers' workshop ===
Nearby to the west of the Stables complex is a small rectangular stone building that has recently been 50% rebuilt that was originally known as the boot makers' workshop.

It is said that two bullet holes can be seen in a wooden shutter on the western side of the barn and these are the legacy of the raid made on the property by the Ben Hall Gang in 1863. There is also a bell called the bushrangers bell which has been rehung next to the old boot makers workshop. Whether or not these items have any authenticity is unknown.

== Heritage listing ==
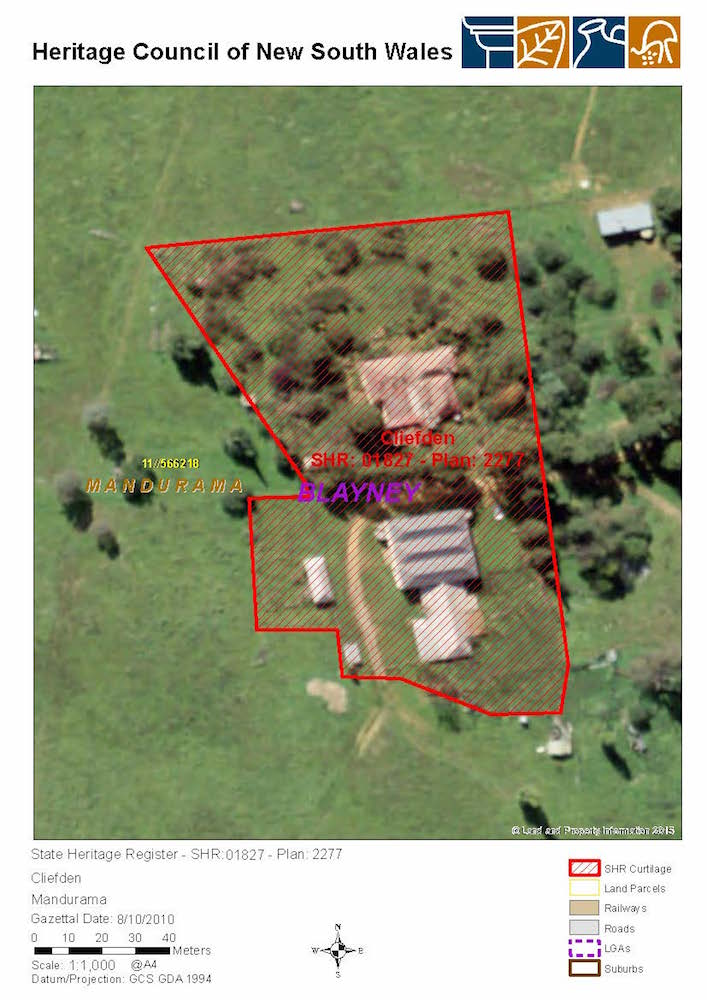
Heritage boundaries

Cliefden contributes to the State significance of the Ben Hall Sites as evidence of bushranger's attacks on private residences and horse stealing. The horse stealing demonstrates the historical importance of horses as the dominant mode of transport and highly prized possessions. Bushranging required horses and the success of Ben Hall and his gang as bushrangers was dependent upon their ability to acquire quality horses that could out-class those provided to the police. The raids on Cliefden demonstrate the importance of horses and Hall's skill and experience in selecting and working with the best breeds.

Cliefden is historically significant in providing evidence of a continuous tradition of rural farming practices from the 1830s until the present day under the ownership of one family. Settled by William Montagu Rothery the homestead farm complex illustrates the working relationships of the once 10,000 hectare sheep station and horse stud over time.

Cliefden is of State significance through its associations with Ben Hall. Hall and his gang were feared by the public and had an impact on a variety of activities, including the fortification of homesteads. Cliefden homestead provides physical evidence of homestead fortification in its enclosed courtyard planning; gun slot by the entrance and thick walls.

Cliefden barn and house are architecturally and aesthetically significant at a State level. Cliefden is architecturally a good representative example of Colonial Georgian farm complex.

Cliefden contributes to the State significance of the Ben Hall Sites as a place recognised by the public to be associated with Ben Hall. Until recently the property was a tourist destination and was available for inspection by groups. Hall is one of the best known bushrangers who operated in New South Wales and forms a significant element in the construction of Australian identity.

Cliefden has archaeological potential. Archaeological investigation may reveal further details about the original homestead which was said to have 26 rooms as well as servants quarters. There may also be evidence about horse breeding and agricultural practices on the station. Cliefden also has significance for it association with the Rothery family who have lived there continuously since c.1832. The Rothery family were well-known horse breeders in the 19th century.

The Ben Hall Sites - Cliefden was listed on the New South Wales State Heritage Register on 8 October 2010 having satisfied the following criteria.

The place is important in demonstrating the course, or pattern, of cultural or natural history in New South Wales.

Cliefden contributes to the State significance of the Ben Hall Sites as evidence of bushranger's attacks on private residences and horse stealing. The horse stealing demonstrates the historical importance of horses as the dominant mode of transport and highly prized possessions. Bushranging required horses and the success of a bushranger hung on his ability to acquire quality horses that could out-class those provided to the police. The raids on Cliefden demonstrates the importance of horses and the bushrangers skill and experience in selecting and working with the best breeds. Cliefden is historically significant in providing evidence of a continuous tradition of rural farming practices from the 1830s until the present day under the ownership of one family. Settled by William Montagu Rothery the homestead farm complex illustrates the working relationships of the once 10,000 hectare sheep station and horse stud over time.

The place has a strong or special association with a person, or group of persons, of importance of cultural or natural history of New South Wales's history.

Cliefden is of State significance through its associations with Ben Hall. Hall and his gang were feared by the public and had an impact on a variety of activities, including the fortification of homesteads. Cliefden provides physical evidence of homestead fortification.

Cliefden has local significance for it association with the Rothery family who have lived there continuously since 1842. The Rothery family were well-known horse breeders in the 19th century. William Montagu Rothery was an influential colonial settler in the area.

The place is important in demonstrating aesthetic characteristics and/or a high degree of creative or technical achievement in New South Wales.

Cliefden barn and house are architecturally and aesthetically significant at a State level. The house is a good example of a Colonial Georgian dwelling which was progressively modified in order to fortify against the attacks of bushrangers and to cater for a growing family. The courtyard planning of the homestead is of particular interest as it enabled the stations thoroughbred horses to be protected within the house enclosure should the homestead come under attack.

The place has strong or special association with a particular community or cultural group in New South Wales for social, cultural or spiritual reasons.

Cliefden contributes to the State significance of the Ben Hall Sites as a site recognised by the public to be associated with Ben Hall. Until recently the property was a tourist destination and was available for inspection by groups. Hall is one of the best known bushrangers who operated in New South Wales and forms a significant element to the construction of Australian identity.

The place has potential to yield information that will contribute to an understanding of the cultural or natural history of New South Wales.

Cliefden has archaeological potential. Archaeological investigation may reveal further details about the original homestead and the gradual changes that were made to fortify it against attack. There may also be evidence about horse breeding and agricultural practices on the station.

The place possesses uncommon, rare or endangered aspects of the cultural or natural history of New South Wales.

Cliefden provides rare physical evidence of the fortification of rural farm complexes against attacks by bushrangers.

The place is important in demonstrating the principal characteristics of a class of cultural or natural places/environments in New South Wales.

Cliefden is significant at a State level as an example of rural properties targeted by bushrangers for the purposes of stealing the highest quality horses. Cliefden is architecturally a good representative example of a Colonial Georgian farm complex.
