= Bushranger Hotel =

The Ben Hall Sites - Bushranger Hotel
- Location within New South Wales Location within Australia
- 34.9123°S 149.4317°E
- Location: 24 Church Street (Federal Highway), Collector, Upper Lachlan Shire, New South Wales, Australia

History
- Built: 1860–1861

New South Wales Heritage Register
- Official name: The Ben Hall Sites - Bushranger Hotel; Kimberley's Commercial Hotel; Kimberley's Inn
- Type: state heritage (built)
- Designated: 8 October 2010
- Reference no.: 1827
- Type: Hotel
- Category: Commercial

Bushranger Hotel is a heritage-listed hotel located at 24 Church Street (Old Federal Highway), Collector, in the Southern Tablelands region of New South Wales, Australia. It is one of a group of historic sites labelled the Ben Hall Sites for their association with bushranger Ben Hall, along with Ben Hall's Death Site, Cliefden, Escort Rock, the Grave of Ben Hall and Wandi. It was built from 1860 to 1861. It is also known as Kimberley's Commercial Hotel and Kimberley's Inn. It was added to the New South Wales State Heritage Register on 8 October 2010.

== History ==
The first official land grants in Collector were to a father and son, Terrence and Terence Aubrey Murray in 1829. The Murrays sub-divided part of their grant in 1841 and apparently gave many of the lots to employees. Around 1851 Thomas Kimberly, a leather-worker, opened a boot shop in the town, and his Wellington boots became well known across the State.

Ten years later (1860–61) Kimberly built Kimberly's Commercial Hotel (Bushranger Hotel). Kimberly incorporated his boot shop into the hotel building. There were five hotels in Collector at this time, catering to the flood of prospective gold miners rushing to the gold fields at Kiandra. Collector was also a staging post on the way to the Monaro area.

On 26 January 1865 Ben Hall, John Gilbert and John Dunn had begun the morning holding up people on the road south of Goulburn until they were scared away by a detachment of troopers. They then moved operations to the outskirts of Collector, where they took eight men and boys hostage, forcing them into town. Hall and Gilbert went into Kimberley's Commercial Hotel for money and firearms while Dunn guarded the captives outside and turned a traveller away by firing several shots in his direction. Meanwhile, Constable Samuel Nelson the only police officer in town at the time, made his way to the hotel, being joined along the way by one of his sons. Another one of his other sons had been taken captive and was already outside the hotel. Dunn, on seeing Nelson approach, took cover behind a fence and called on Nelson to halt. When he failed to do so Dunn fired a rifle, hitting Nelson in the stomach. Dunn then pulled out his revolver and fired, this time hitting him in the face. Nelson fell dead. Nelson's son escaped into town as Dunn fired on him. On hearing the shots, Hall and Gilbert came out of the Hotel and, after rifling the Nelson's body and taking his belt and firearms, they left town.

A memorial to Constable Nelson has since been erected next to the hotel.

The later history of the hotel has been overshadowed by its associations with Ben Hall, but it is known to have been licensed by a Mrs Marlin. The building is still operating as a hotel with a bistro and accommodation.

== Description ==
The Hotel consists of two buildings which have been joined by a roof and incremental additions. The original building at the front is Victorian Georgian and was originally constructed without verandahs. The building is constructed of random rubble stone with red brick quoins around the majority of windows and doors. The rear wall of the front building is constructed of blockwork. The building has a truncated gable roof with a rear skillion and is two storeys over a split level.

To the western end of the main building the wall has been extended at the ground floor level and a side wing added to form the public bar. The construction of the front wall of the public bar is similar to the front wall of the main building but was built at a later date as evidenced by the earliest photograph of the hotel. A two-storey verandah with masonry columns has been added to the front of the building and enclosed on the upper level for use as a sleepout. A rounded corner enclosure has been added to the front of the ground floor bar extension.

Behind the main building is another building which was originally separate but it has since been joined by a roof. The building is constructed of the same random rubble stone with red brick quoins and has a lopsided gable roof.

Internally the building is used as a bar, lounge and restaurant, kitchen and beer garden on the ground level. Upstairs the building houses guest accommodation.

On the western end of the hotel is a memorial to Constable Nelson who was killed by John Dunn, a member of Ben Hall's Gang, on that spot in 1865. It is a granite obelisk on a base of three steps, surrounded by a steel picket fence. The inscription reads " This monument is erected by the Government of NSW to the memory of Constable Samuel Nelson who was shot dead on this spot whilst in the execution of his duty by the outlaw John Dunn on 26th January 1865."

The building has had a verandah added to the front and a bar added to the side. An enclosed beer garden has also been added to the side. The space between the front building and the rear building has been enclosed. Past owners found fire arms under the floorboards. The cellar has been filled in.

The hotel was reported to be in good condition as at 12 March 2009, although with many additions and alterations and some evidence of salt damp. The hotel retains its integrity and has continuously operated as a hotel since it was built.

== Heritage listing ==
Bushranger Hotel, originally Kimberley's Commercial Hotel, contributes to the State significance of the Ben Hall Sites as a surviving example of the many public houses and stores robbed by Ben Hall and his gang. The hotel is one of the only surviving places which has been in continuous use that was the subject of attack by bushrangers. It was also illustrates the gangs practice of taking citizens hostage in a public bar whilst the bushrangers undertook their robbery. The Hotel illustrates the loss of life and considerable fear instilled in the community by the bushrangers. Constable Nelson was killed adjacent to the Hotel whilst attempting to stop the robbery and taking of hostages on 26 Jan 1865, one of three murders committed by Ben Hall's gang. The hotel has local significance as a good example of hotels built in response to the increase in population during the period of the gold rush in the area. The Bushranger Hotel has significance at a Local level as a mid 19th century stone hotel building constructed in the Victorian Georgian style.

Bushranger Hotel was listed on the New South Wales State Heritage Register on 8 October 2010 having satisfied the following criteria.

The place is important in demonstrating the course, or pattern, of cultural or natural history in New South Wales.

The Bushranger Hotel which was originally Kimberley's Commercial Hotel is of State significance as one of the Ben Hall Sites. The hotel is one of the only surviving places which has been in continuous use that was the subject of attack by bushrangers in NSW. It demonstrates the type of place targeted by criminals who became known as bushrangers in the latter half of the 19th century. The Bushranger Hotel is of local significance as it exemplifies rural hotels in the 1860s and because the hotel provides physical evidence of the influence the gold rush had upon commerce and development of the area.

The place has a strong or special association with a person, or group of persons, of importance of cultural or natural history of New South Wales's history.

The Bushranger Hotel is associated with Ben Hall, John Dunn and John Gilbert notorious bushrangers active in the Central West of NSW in the 1860s. The hotel was subject to a raid by the Ben Hall gang on 26 Jan 1865 when the place was used to hold hostages they captured on the road to Goulburn and money was taken. The Bushranger Hotel contributes to the State significance of the Ben Hall Sites as the site of Constable Nelson's murder by John Dunn, a member of Ben Hall's gang during the raid by the gang. The Hotel illustrates the loss of life and considerable fear instilled in the community by the bushrangers. This was one of the three murders committed by Ben Hall's gang.

The place is important in demonstrating aesthetic characteristics and/or a high degree of creative or technical achievement in New South Wales.

The Bushranger hotel has significance at a Local level as a mid 19th century stone hotel building constructed in the Victorian Georgian style.

The place has strong or special association with a particular community or cultural group in New South Wales for social, cultural or spiritual reasons.

Due to the association of the hotel with Ben Hall the place does have some value to contemporary Australian society. This is only at a State level when considered collectively with the other Ben Hall Sites.

The place has potential to yield information that will contribute to an understanding of the cultural or natural history of New South Wales.

The hotel has the potential to have mid 19th century archaeology some of which may relate to defending the hotel such as the fire arms said to have been found under the floor.

The place possesses uncommon, rare or endangered aspects of the cultural or natural history of New South Wales.

The Bushranger Hotel is of local significance as the sole survivor of the five original inns at Collector.

The place is important in demonstrating the principal characteristics of a class of cultural or natural places/environments in New South Wales.

The Bushranger Hotel contributes to the State significance of the Ben Hall Sites as it is representative of the public houses and stores robbed by bushrangers in NSW and, in particular, the Ben Hall gang. The site is representative of the loss of life and fear inflicted on communities through bushranging activities of the Ben Hall gang. The hotel is significant at a local level as a representative example of a mid 19th Century hotel built in the Victorian Georgian style.
