= Gold Escort =

A pen and ink watercolour painting of the Gold Escort in Victoria by W. Drummond (1852)

Gold Escorts were common across Australian goldfields, transporting mined and processed material from mines to banks and mints across the country.

They were important in safely transporting gold, and were in most cases carried out by police assisted units.

== Victoria ==
During the Victorian Gold Rush of the 1850s, a special armed detachment from South Australia provided a 'Gold Escort' for the secure transportation of gold overland from the western Victorian gold fields to Adelaide. The first gold escort led by Alexander Tolmer (a 'colourful' character who later became the South Australian Police Commissioner) departed Victoria on 5 March 1852 carrying 5,199 ounces (150 kg) of gold and arrived in Adelaide two weeks later. Eventually, eighteen trips were made between 1852 and 1853 transporting 328,502 ounces (9,310 kg) of gold. The Victorian-goldfields to Adelaide route was notable for the distance and amount of gold carried, almost a quarter of all gold, 1,520,578 ounces (43,110 kg), transported within Victoria during the gold rush (1851-1865).

The Gold Escort route started in the Bendigo area and then went west across the Pyrenees to the small settlement of Horsham. From Horsham, the route passed north-west through the Little Desert region into South Australian territory and then ran roughly parallel with the coast to Adelaide.

== New South Wales ==
Gold escorts were targets of bushrangers.

On Sunday, 15 June 1862, a group of bushrangers, led by Frank Gardiner ambushed the gold escort near Eugowra, 23 miles east of Forbes, and robbed the coach of gold and bank-notes of an estimated value of £14,000.

The bushranger Ben Hall and his gang made a surprise attack on the Araluen gold escort on 13 March 1865, as it travelled up the old mountain road, just outside Majors Creek. Although one constable was seriously wounded, the police escorting the gold resisted, and the bushrangers fled empty-handed. The wagonette that was carrying the gold is preserved in the Braidwood Museum.
