= Gunningbland Creek =

Gunningbland
- Location of the Gunningbland Creek mouth in New South Wales

Location
- Country: Australia
- State: New South Wales
- Region: NSW South Western Slopes (IBRA), Central West
- LGA: Forbes

Physical characteristics
- Source confluence: Myall Creek and Box Camp Creeks
  - location: west of Parkes
  - coordinates: 33°2′46″S 147°59′4″E
  - elevation: 271 m (889 ft)
- Mouth: confluence with the Goobang Creek
  - location: west of Bogan Gate
  - coordinates: 33°9′29″S 147°27′10″E
  - elevation: 206 m (676 ft)
- Length: 54 km (34 mi)

Basin features
- River system: Lachlan sub–catchment, Murray–Darling basin

The Gunningbland Creek, a perennial river of the Lachlan sub–catchment, part of the Murrumbidgee catchment of the Murray–Darling basin, is located in the Central West region of New South Wales, Australia.

== Course and features ==
The Gunningbland Creek (technically a river) is formed by or near the confluence of the Myall and Box Camp Creeks, west of Parkes, and flows generally west southwest before reaching its confluence with the Goobang Creek, west of Bogan Gate. The creek descends 65 metres (213 ft) over its 54-kilometre (34 mi) course.

== See also ==
- List of rivers of New South Wales (A–K)
- Rivers of New South Wales
