= Wandi, Marulan =

Wandi
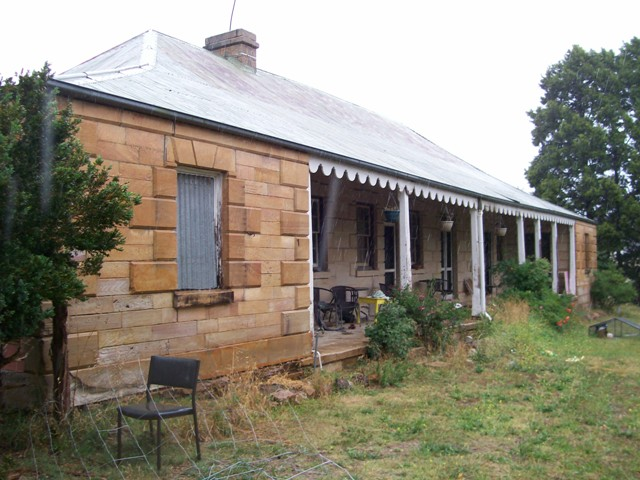
- Front of Wandi facing the Hume Highway

- Location within New South Wales Location within Australia
- 34.7422°S 149.9128°E
- Location: 16501 Hume Highway, Narambulla Creek, 9.5 km south of, Marulan, Goulburn Mulwaree Council, New South Wales, Australia

History
- Built: 1843–

New South Wales Heritage Register
- Official name: The Ben Hall Sites - Wandi; Plumb's Inn; Shelleys Flats; Douglass Inn
- Type: state heritage (built)
- Designated: 8 October 2010
- Reference no.: 1827
- Type: House
- Category: Residential buildings (private)

Wandi is a heritage-listed former coaching inn and now residence at 16501 Hume Highway, Narambulla Creek, Marulan, Goulburn Mulwaree Council, New South Wales, Australia. It is one of a group of historic sites labelled the Ben Hall Sites for their association with bushranger Ben Hall, along with Ben Hall's Death Site, the Bushranger Hotel, Cliefden, Escort Rock, and the Grave of Ben Hall. It was built from 1843. It is also known as Plumb's Inn, Shelleys Flats and Douglass Inn. It was added to the New South Wales State Heritage Register on 8 October 2010.

== History ==
The land on which the Inn was constructed was purchased by William Shelley on 13 September 1837 for 160 pounds. The first conclusive evidence of the Inn's construction was a conveyance in 1843 that included the description: "the substantial stone built dwelling-house or Inn called or known as the Douglas Inn."

On 19 April 1853 the land was sold to Robert Plumb, farmer of Brisbane Meadow for 1500 pounds. Plumb was granted a licence in April 1854 and must have continued to renew it until at least 1864 and possibly until he sold the land in 1869. Plumb was recorded on the electoral role as "Innkeeper, on Shelleys Flats".

On 19 December 1864 the Ben Hall gang settled themselves on the Sydney to Goulburn Road between Goulburn and Narambulla Creek. Their main object was the Goulburn coach, but from eight in the morning they took captive and robbed anyone who came along the road. By the time the coach had arrived there were 35 captives and a dray. On completing their inspection of the coach at around two in the afternoon everyone was released. The bushrangers remained on the road and held up the local passenger coach from Berrima. Meanwhile, the buggy of the Honourable William Macleay, Member of Parliament for Murrumbidgee, arrived at Plumb's Inn as the bushrangers appeared on either side of the road and a shot was fired at him. Guests celebrating the wedding of Plumb's daughter were on the verandah of the Inn and were rushed inside by Macleay who then shot his rifle at the bushrangers, driving them away. Macleay received widespread acclamation for his action.

== Description ==
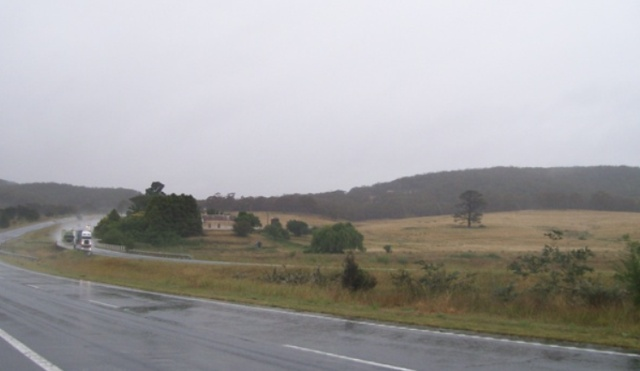
Viewed from Hume Highway travelling east towards Marulan

The house is located on a rise above Nambulla Creek. From the property looking north west past the Hume Highway can be seen Rampion Hills. The view to the south is of Narumbulla Creek.

=== Inn building ===
The building formerly known as Plumbs Inn is now a residence on a property known as Wandi. The residence is a sandstone building with stone quoins. The front has rooms flanking either end of a central verandah with stone paving. This part of the building is rectangular with a low hip roof. Chamfered edged quoins are located on the corners and around the windows and doors on the front elevation.

Adjoining at its western end is another wing, which is a rectangular building under a hipped roof of the same period.

The sandstone blocks on the front facade are laid in ashlar coursework. The sides and rear of the main building have been rendered leaving the stone corner quoins and lintels and the stone base course exposed. the side wing has also been rendered except for under the verandah of the facade facing the courtyard which faces east. This facade also has stone blocks laid in ashlar pattern. The wing also has a dormer window in the roof facing east indicating an attic level.

=== Outbuildings ===
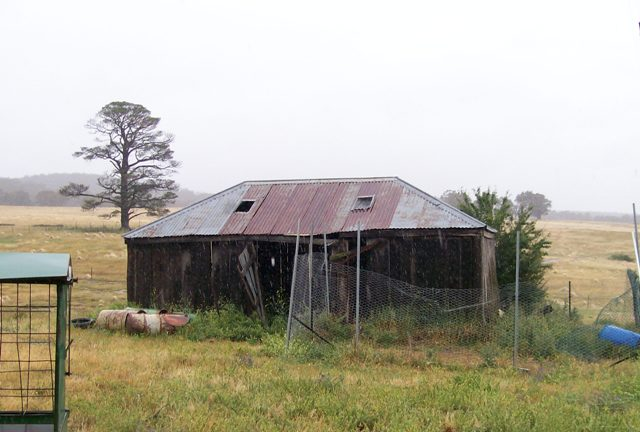
Slab hut to rear of the house

Other buildings on the property within 100 metres of the house of interest are:

- One slab structure built with timber slabs laid vertically under a corrugated steel roof. In very poor condition.
- One very small house. Not inspected up close. It has a gable roof and front verandah with two windows flanking a central door.
- The Parish map showing Plumbs Inn also shows two smaller buildings.

=== Condition ===
As at 19 March 2009, the inn building was reported to be in poor condition as at 19 March 2009. Although it was partially inhabited there was windows without glass that had been covered with sheets of iron; a lot of roof sheeting was loose; there is a lot of rubbish around the property which was a fire hazard; there was some evidence of cracking in the eastern corner; the stone base course showed evidence of spalling and the unsecure nature of the property placed it at risk. There is a potential for archaeology.

It is externally very intact.

== Heritage listing ==
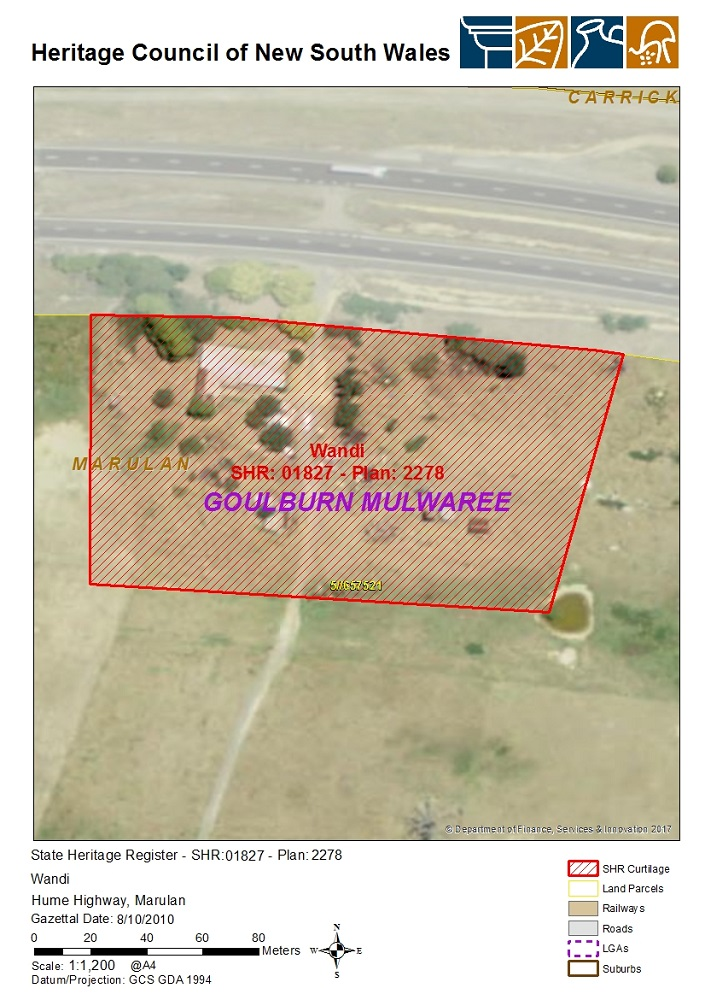
Heritage boundaries

Wandi, originally known as Plumb's Inn, contributes to the State significance of the Ben Hall Sites as a well known element of the Ben Hall story. The inn was the site of resistance to an attack by the Hall gang when William Macleay, a prominent pastoralist and Member of Parliament for the Murrumbidgee, retaliated and drove the bushrangers off. Resistance to the bushrangers from the public was uncommon and historically the reasons why are a source of speculation that fuels the mythology surrounding Hall and other bushrangers.

Wandi provides physical evidence of the role of the rural hotel in travel in the 1840s. It provided refreshment and accommodation on the road for travellers on trips between Goulburn and Sydney which was essential due to the length of time for such journeys.

The building is an excellent example of a former Colonial Georgian coaching inn. The style of the building and its method of construction provide an insight into what is an increasingly uncommon example of 1840s architecture. It also exemplifies the types of places targeted by Ben Hall and his fellow bushrangers.

At a local level the property has potential for archaeological evidence from its early use as a hotel from 1843.

Wandi was listed on the New South Wales State Heritage Register on 8 October 2010 having satisfied the following criteria.

The place is important in demonstrating the course, or pattern, of cultural or natural history in New South Wales.

Wandi adds to the state significance of the Ben Hall Sites for its links with the activities of bushrangers, in particular holds by the road side, and attempts to take hostages at public places such as Inns.

The Inn provides physical evidence of the role of the rural hotel in travel in the 1840s. It provided refreshment and accommodation on the road for travellers on trips between Goulburn and Sydney which was essential due to the length of time for such journeys.

The place has a strong or special association with a person, or group of persons, of importance of cultural or natural history of New South Wales's history.

Wandi adds to the State significance of the Ben Hall Sites as a well known element of the Ben Hall story. The former Inn was the site of resistance to an attack by the Hall gang when a politician William Macleay retaliated and drove the bushrangers off. Resistance to the bushrangers from the public was uncommon and historically the reasons why are a source of speculation that fuels the mythology surrounding Hall and other bushrangers.

Wandi is associated with William Macleay, a prominent pastoralist and Member of Parliament for Murrumbidgee in 1864.

The place is important in demonstrating aesthetic characteristics and/or a high degree of creative or technical achievement in New South Wales.

Wandi is an excellent example of a Colonial Georgian hotel and residence. The style of the building and its method of construction provides an insight into what is an increasingly uncommon example of 1840s architecture.

The place has strong or special association with a particular community or cultural group in New South Wales for social, cultural or spiritual reasons.

Due to the association of the former Inn with Ben Hall the place does have some value to contemporary Australian society. This is only at a State level when considered collectively with the other Ben Hall Sites.

The place has potential to yield information that will contribute to an understanding of the cultural or natural history of New South Wales.

The property has potential for archaeological evidence from its early use as a hotel from 1843. This satisfies the criteria at a local level.

The place is important in demonstrating the principal characteristics of a class of cultural or natural places/environments in New South Wales.

Wandi is a good example of a Colonial Georgian rural hotel. It also exemplifies the types of places held up by Ben Hall and his fellow bushrangers.
