= Ben Hall's Death Site =

Historic site in New South Wales, Australia

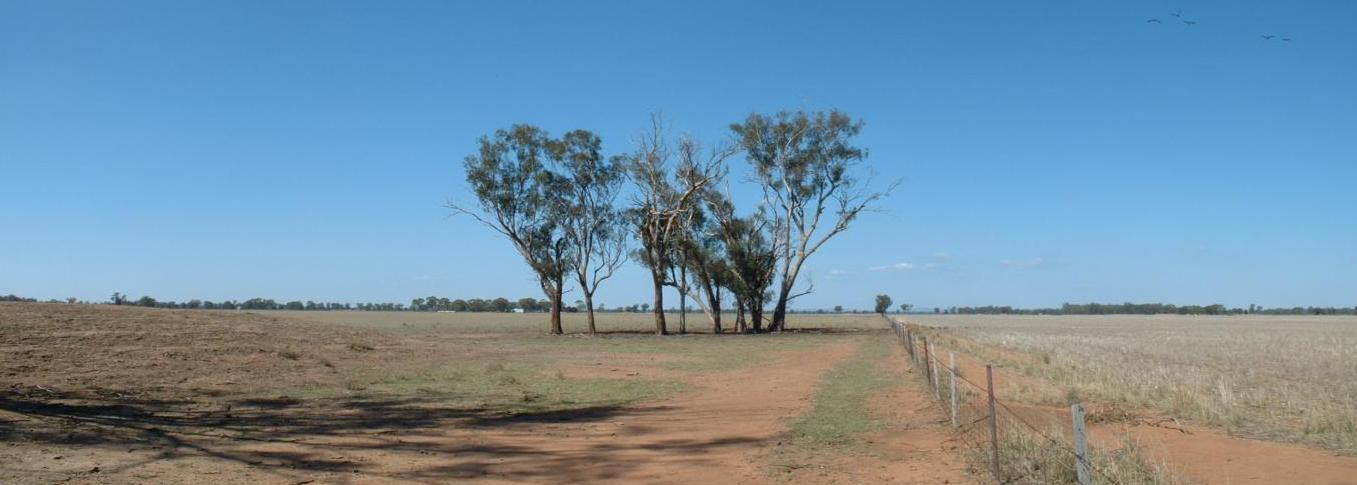
- Billabong Creek, where Ben Hall died

- Location within New South Wales Location within Australia
- 33.2212°S 147.9028°E
- Location: Billabong Creek, Ben Halls Road, Forbes, Forbes Shire, New South Wales, Australia

History
- Built: 1865–

New South Wales Heritage Register
- Official name: The Ben Hall Sites - Ben Hall's Death Site; Blowclear Pastoral Run; Ben Hall's Place
- Type: state heritage (landscape)
- Designated: 8 October 2010
- Reference no.: 1827
- Type: Other - Landscape - Cultural
- Category: Landscape - Cultural

Ben Hall's Death Site is a heritage-listed site at Billabong Creek, Ben Halls Road, Forbes, Forbes Shire, New South Wales, Australia. It is one of a group of historic sites labelled the Ben Hall Sites for their association with bushranger Ben Hall, along with the Bushranger Hotel, Cliefden, Escort Rock, the Grave of Ben Hall and Wandi. It is also known as Blowclear Pastoral Run and Ben Hall's Place. It was added to the New South Wales State Heritage Register on 8 October 2010.

== History ==
Nelungaloo Station was formerly Blowclear pastoral run, which was owned by Thomas Morris in 1840. It was on land belonging to this property that on 5 May 1865 Ben Hall was shot to death by police officers and Aboriginal trackers.

At the end of April 1865 Hall, Gilbert and Dunn were in the vicinity of Forbes where they stole horses from Yamma Station and Gumbidgewa station. Meanwhile, Mick Coneley had turned from friend to informant lured by the 1000 pound reward for Hall and had been following the gang's movements and reporting them to the police. On 29 April a party of 6 police and 2 Aboriginal trackers led by Sub Inspector Davidson left the police barracks in Forbes and "encamped in dense Scrub" about 10 km from where they had been told the gang would meet.

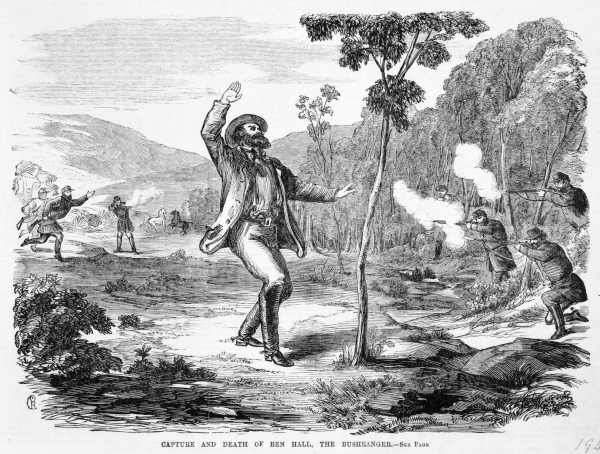
Capture and death of bushranger Ben Hall

Gilbert and Dunn arrived at the rendezvous camp several days before Hall on 2 May but were scared off by some local stockmen whom they mistook to be troopers. On the afternoon of 4 May Ben Hall arrived at the camp which was a dense area of scrub adjacent to Billabong Creek near Mick Coneley's hut. Sub-Inspector James Davidson, Sergeant James Condell, troopers Thomas Hipkiss, John Boyan, John Caban, Edward Buckley and Aboriginal trackers William (Billy) Dargin and Charley (Goolagong) were still waiting although they had run out of supplies. At six am on 5 May Hall emerged from the bush and walked towards his two hobbled horses, he was then shot multiple times by police.

Hall's body, after being searched, was strapped to the back of one of his horses and taken to the Forbes police station. Davidson had hoped to keep Hall's death a secret in the hope of trapping Gilbert and Dunn, but it could not be done - there was too much excitement over Hall's death and reportedly his body attracted 400-500 people.

A map of Hall's death site was drawn by Inspector Davidson as part of the police report on Hall's death, and is the basis for the site identification.

== Description ==
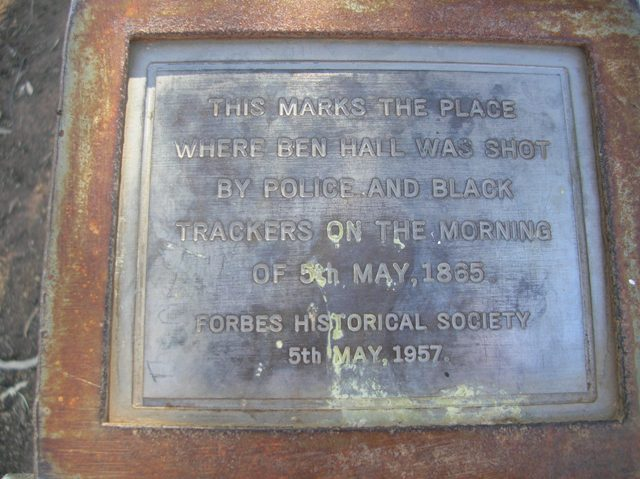
Plaque at his death site

Ben Hall's Death Site is located between Forbes and Bogan Gate, approximately 19 kilometres northwest of Forbes. The site itself was marked by the Forbes Historical Society in 1957 with a metal plaque on a steel post. The site is a group of small trees on an otherwise treeless plain. The site is accessible by a small gate from Ben Hall's road and is adjacent to a dam. Billabong Creek, where Mick Coneley had his hut, is located to the north west of the site. The actual location of where the events of Hall's death took place has been ascertained using the notes and map of Inspector Davison which were reproduced in Peter Bradley's book "The Judas Covenant".

A large painted sign with the story of Ben Hall's death is located near the entrance to the paddock. A dam was recently constructed nearby.

It was reported as at 12 March 2009 that the site is unlikely to have archaeological potential, but that the Mick Coneley hut site does have archaeological potential.

== Heritage listing ==
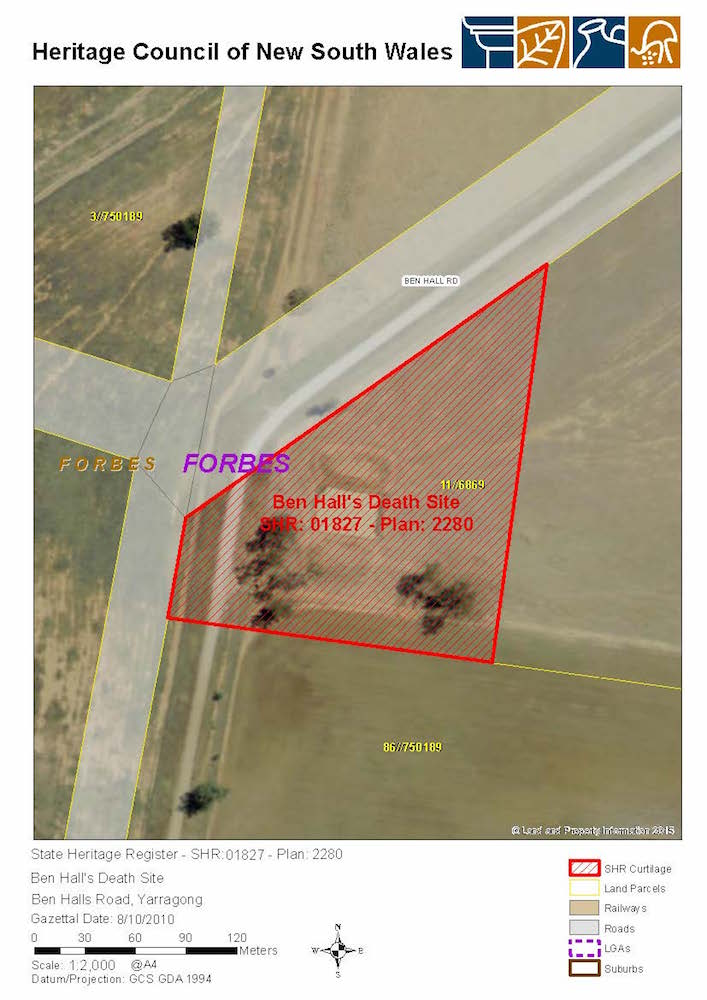
Heritage boundary map

Ben Hall's Death Site is associated with the introduction of the Felons Apprehension Act (Outlaws Act) which permitted police or anyone else to shoot on sight. The brutality of Halls murder is partly a consequence of the introduction of this legislation, even though it was not legally in force until several days later. The manner of Halls death at this site demonstrates police brutality and fear when dealing with the bushrangers, Hall was shot numerous times and then many more times after he was dead.

Ben Hall's Death Site is associated with the employment of Aboriginal people by the NSW police. The site demonstrates the skill of Aboriginal trackers Billy Dargin and Charlie which ensured the police were able to locate Hall.

Ben Hall's Death Site contributes to the State significance of the Ben Hall Sites through its intimate associations with Ben Hall and the place he holds in the public's imagination. Hall's Death Site has contributed to the romanticisation of a notorious bushranger. The site has high social value as evidenced by the naming of the road (Ben Hall Road), signage and a monument and visitor numbers to the site despite its distance from Forbes township.

The Ben Hall Sites - Ben Hall's Death Site was listed on the New South Wales State Heritage Register on 8 October 2010 having satisfied the following criteria.

The place is important in demonstrating the course, or pattern, of cultural or natural history in New South Wales.

The site of the death of Ben Hall is associated with the introduction of the Felons Apprehension Act (Outlaws Act) which permitted police or anyone else to shoot on sight. Previously the police were required to apprehend and confirm identity and a trial took place before sentencing. Hall, Gilbert and Dunn were declared outlaws under the new act although the legislation did not come into force until 5 days after Hall was shot by police. The manner of Halls death at this site demonstrates police brutality and fear when dealing with the bushrangers, Hall was shot numerous times and then many more times after he was dead. The brutality of Halls murder is partly a consequence of the introduction of this legislation. Ben Hall's Death Site is associated with the employment of Aboriginal people by the NSW police. The site demonstrates the skill of Aboriginal trackers Billy Dargin and Charlie which ensured the police were able to locate Hall.

The place has a strong or special association with a person, or group of persons, of importance of cultural or natural history of New South Wales's history.

Ben Hall's Death Site contributes to the State significance of the Ben Hall Sites through its intimate associations with the Ben Hall story. Hall and his gang heavily influenced the movement of people and money through regional areas between 1862 and 1865. The exploits of the bushrangers lead to increased police in rural areas and security for gold escorts and mail coaches. Ben Hall's Death Site is integral to the story of the Ben Hall gang, in that, with his death, the gang also met its demise.

The place has a strong or special association with a particular community or cultural group in New South Wales for social, cultural or spiritual reasons.

Ben Hall's Death Site is of State significance for its associations with Ben Hall and the place he holds in the public's imagination and consciousness. Hall is one of the best known bushrangers who operated in New South Wales and forms a significant element to the construction of the Australian identity. With the rise in nationalist sentiment leading up to Federation it was important for colonists and early Australians to be able to present themselves as a young and respectable nation. It was this necessity that lead to the romanticisation of the bushrangers, and in particular Ben Hall. Ben Hall's life has captured the public imagination through this process of romanticisation. Death sites of cultural legends like Ben Hall have high value to a range of people. The site is visited by tourists trying to recapture the spirit of Ben Hall.

The place possesses uncommon, rare or endangered aspects of the cultural or natural history of New South Wales.

Ben Hall's Death Site is rare as a well documented site of a bushranger's death in the bush. The large majority of NSW bushrangers were killed in sieges in buildings; were hung in Darlinghurst Gaol, or died under more ordinary circumstances.
