= Grave of Ben Hall =

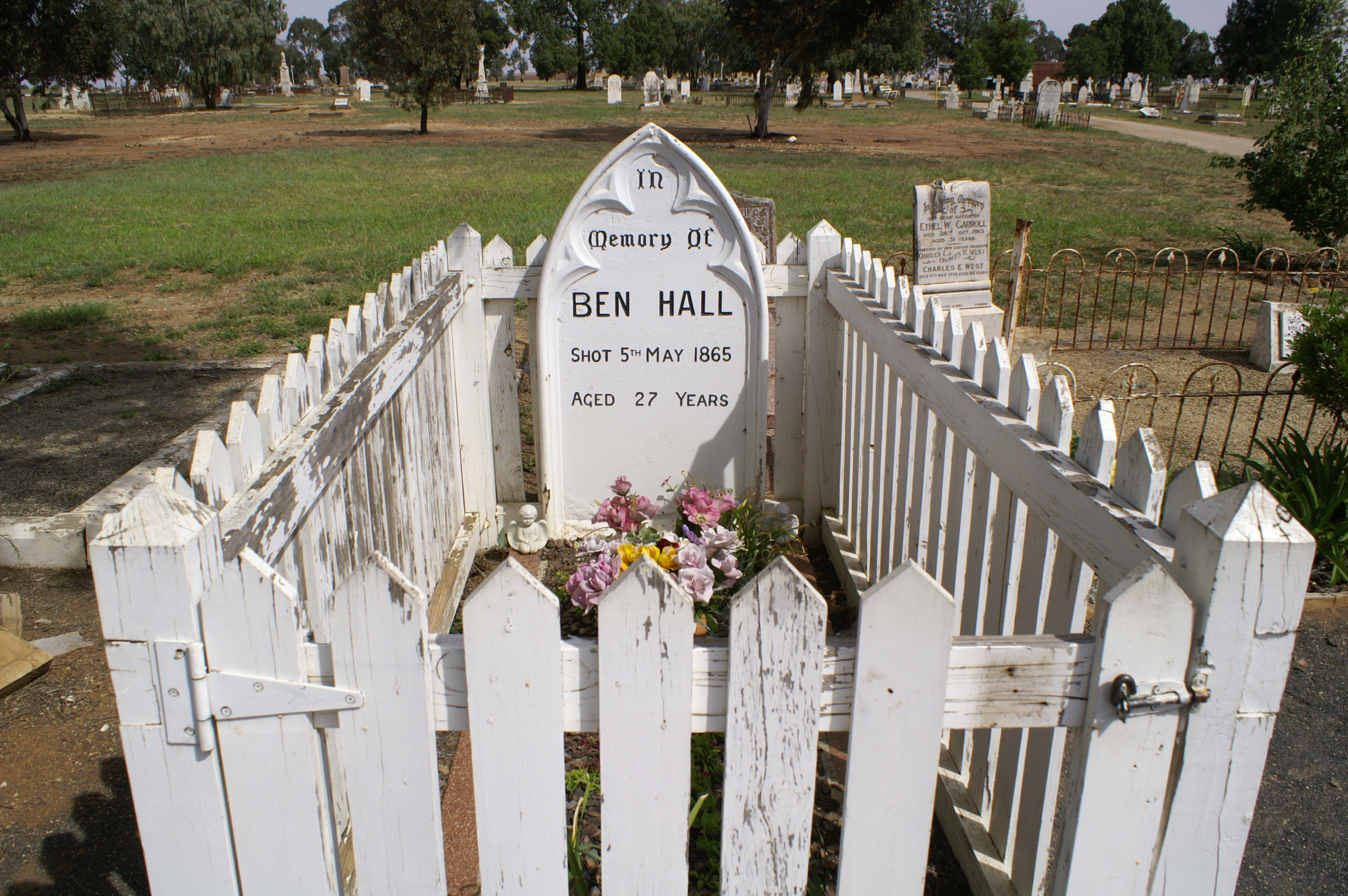

- Location within New South Wales Location within Australia
- 33.3717°S 147.9956°E
- Location: Forbes Cemetery, Bogan Gate Road, Forbes, Forbes Shire, New South Wales, Australia

History
- Built: 1865–

Site notes
- Architect: Headstone - Mr Jones
- Owner: Forbes Shire Council

New South Wales Heritage Register
- Official name: The Ben Hall Sites - Grave of Ben Hall; Ben Hall's Grave
- Type: state heritage (landscape)
- Designated: 8 October 2010
- Reference no.: 1827
- Type: Headstone
- Category: Cemeteries and Burial Sites
- Builders: Mr Jones

The Grave of Ben Hall is a heritage-listed headstone of Australian bushranger Ben Hall at Forbes Cemetery, Bogan Gate Road, Forbes, New South Wales, in the state's Central West region. It is one of a group of historic sites labelled the Ben Hall Sites for their association with bushranger Ben Hall, along with Ben Hall's Death Site, the Bushranger Hotel, Cliefden, Escort Rock and Wandi. It is also known as Ben Hall's Grave. The property is owned by Forbes Shire Council. It was added to the New South Wales State Heritage Register on 8 October 2010.

== History ==
Forbes General Cemetery was established in 1863, and was in use through to 1994. The cemetery contains the graves of many notable figures including fellow gang members John O'Meally and Warrigal Walsh and Aboriginal tracker Billy Dargin who were buried in unmarked graves.

Hall was killed by police on the morning of 5 May 1865. He was buried in the Forbes Cemetery on Sunday 7 May 1865. His funeral hearse was followed by about 50 people and three buggies - some family and some curious locals.

The grave was probably initially unmarked, being surrounded by a picket fence sometime before 1900. In 1957 the grave was marked with a stone that had in rough black paint Ben Hall's details. Around 1957 author Edgar Penzig and a local erected the present marker. Ben Hall's age as inscribed on the headstone has been disputed and some claim he was in fact 28 years old when he died. The Australian Dictionary of Biography records his birth date as 9 May 1837 which would make him 27 years old when he died.

Ben Hall's grave is now a marketed tourist destination and is included in tourism brochures for Forbes.

== Description ==
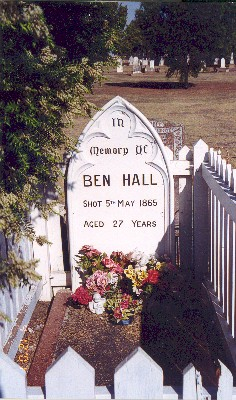

The headstone is Gothic Revival in style with the inscription:

IN
Memory Of
BEN HALL
SHOT 5th MAY 1865
AGED 27 YEARS

The headstone and grave are surrounded by a white picket fence with a gate opposite the headstone.

The grave is located on the central eastern boundary of Forbes Cemetery, on the corner with an access track heading west.

The grave was reported to be in good condition as at 3 July 2009.

== Heritage listing ==
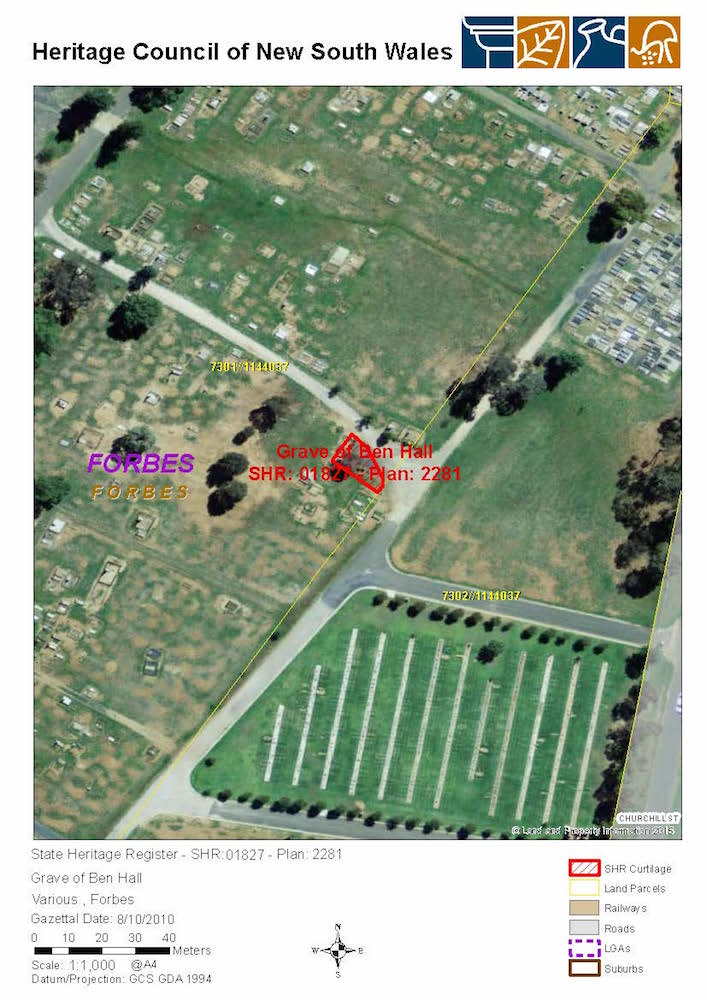
Heritage boundaries

The Grave of Ben Hall adds to the State significance of the Ben Hall Sites as the final part of the Hall story. Hall and his gang had substantial impact on the early development of the police force, including the employment of Aboriginal people by the police force and the movement of money and people between country towns. The Ben Hall Grave adds to the State significance of the Ben Hall Sites for the social significance attached to it by the community. Ben Hall has captured the minds of the public as a gentleman bushranger or Robin Hood type character. Grave sites and the memorialisation of the dead are intimately connected with this process.

The Grave site is historically associated with Aboriginal tracker Billy Dargin, whom played an active part in Hall's capture and two other bushrangers, John O'Meally and Warrigal Walsh, associates of Halls, all of whom are buried in unmarked graves in the same cemetery.

The Ben Hall Sites - Grave of Ben Hall was listed on the New South Wales State Heritage Register on 8 October 2010 having satisfied the following criteria.

The place is important in demonstrating the course, or pattern, of cultural or natural history in New South Wales.

The grave of Ben Hall adds to the State significance of the Ben Hall Sites as the final part of the Hall story. Hall and his gang had substantial impact on the early development of the police force, including the employment of Aboriginal people in the police force and the movement of money and people between country towns.

The place has a strong or special association with a person, or group of persons, of importance of cultural or natural history of New South Wales's history.

This grave is associated with Ben Hall the bushranger who was buried there on 7 May 1865. The grave adds to the significance of the Ben Hall Sites because it is the burial place of Ben Hall who became notorious in his own time and is well known by the Australian public. The cemetery is also significant as the resting place for Aboriginal tracker Billy Dargin, two other bushrangers John O'Meally and Warrigal Walsh as well as the grave of Mary Kelly (bushranger Ned Kelly's sister).

The place has strong or special association with a particular community or cultural group in New South Wales for social, cultural or spiritual reasons.

The Ben Hall Grave adds to the State significance of the Ben Hall Sites for the social significance attached to it by the community. Ben Hall has captured the minds of the public as a gentleman bushranger or Robin Hood type character. Grave sites and the memorialisation of the dead is intimately connected with this process.

The place has potential to yield information that will contribute to an understanding of the cultural or natural history of New South Wales.

The Grave has significance at a local level. The forensic remains of Ben Hall may reveal more information about the way he died and the burial customs of the times.

The place is important in demonstrating the principal characteristics of a class of cultural or natural places/environments in New South Wales.

The marking of the Grave of Ben Hall is representative of public sentiment surrounding Hall as a well known historic figure.
