= Goobang Creek =

Goobang Billabong, Coobang
- Location of the Goobang Creek mouth in New South Wales
- Etymology: Aboriginal: a species of acacia

Location
- Country: Australia
- State: New South Wales
- Region: NSW South Western Slopes (IBRA), Central West
- LGA: Parkes, Forbes
- Towns: Parkes, Condobolin

Physical characteristics
- Source: Curumbenya Range
  - location: north of Wolabler Mountain
  - coordinates: 32°58′53″S 148°25′11″E
  - elevation: 504 m (1,654 ft)
- Mouth: confluence with the Lachlan River
  - location: Condobolin
  - coordinates: 33°5′20″S 147°9′26″E
  - elevation: 192 m (630 ft)
- Length: 217 km (135 mi)

Basin features
- River system: Lachlan sub–catchment, Murray-Darling basin
- Tributaries
  - left: Billabong Creek (Goobang Creek), Crooked Creek (Goobang Creek), Gunningbland Creek
  - right: Ramsays Lagoon

The Goobang Creek, a perennial stream of the Lachlan sub–catchment, part of the Murrumbidgee catchment of the Murray-Darling basin, is located in the Central West region of New South Wales, Australia.

== Course and features ==
The Goobang Creek rises in the Curumbenya Range, 10 kilometres (6.2 mi) north of Wolabler Mountain, east of Alectown. The creek flows generally southwest towards Parkes and then generally west, joined by three minor tributaries before reaching its confluence with the Lachlan River at Condobolin. The creek descends 312 metres (1,024 ft) over its 217-kilometre (135 mi) course.

The Newell Highway crosses the creek near Parkes.

== History ==
Prior to European settlement, the catchment area of the creek was inhabited by the Wiradjuri people. Major Thomas Mitchell and John Oxley were early explorers in the area. The town of Condobolin was proclaimed in 1859. In the mid-1860s, gold was mined on the creek. The bushranger Ben Hall was shot dead at Goobang Creek in 1865.

== Etymology ==
Goobang is believed to be an Aboriginal word for a species of the acacia tree.

== See also ==
- List of rivers of New South Wales (A-K)
- Rivers of New South Wales
