= Eugowra =

Eugowra New South Wales
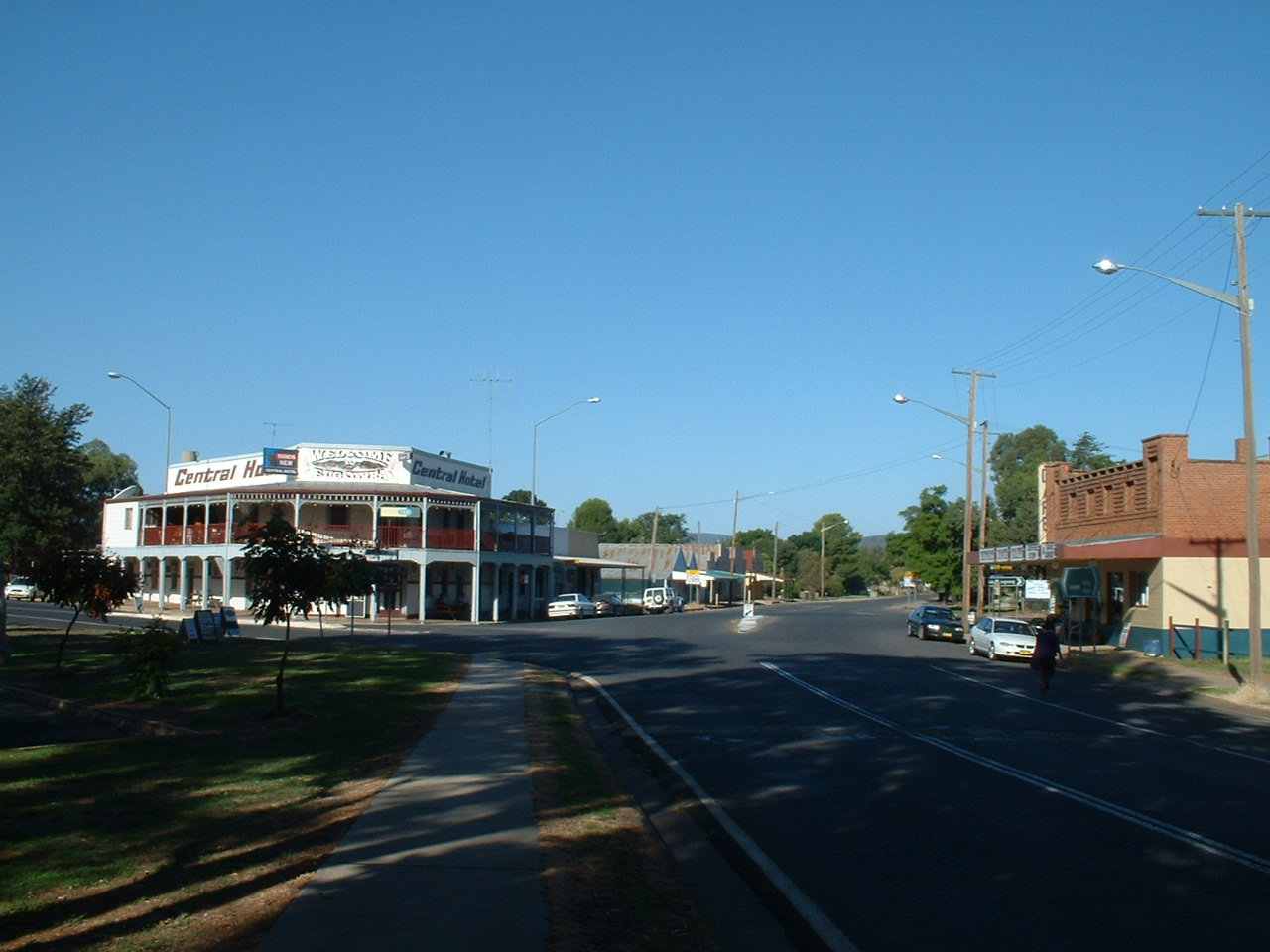
- The main street of Eugowra

- Coordinates: 33°26′0″S 148°22′0″E
- Population: 601 (UCL 2021)
- Postcode(s): 2806
- Elevation: 271 m (889 ft)
- Location: 341 km (212 mi) W of Sydney; 81 km (50 mi) W of Orange; 38 km (24 mi) E of Forbes; 33 km (21 mi) NW of Canowindra
- LGA(s): Cabonne Shire; Forbes Shire
- State electorate(s): Orange
- Federal division(s): Calare; Parkes

Eugowra is a town in the Central West region of New South Wales, Australia. The town is split between Forbes Shire and Cabonne Shire local government area, 341 kilometres (212 mi) west of the state capital, Sydney. At the 2016 census, Eugowra had a population of 779.

== Geography ==
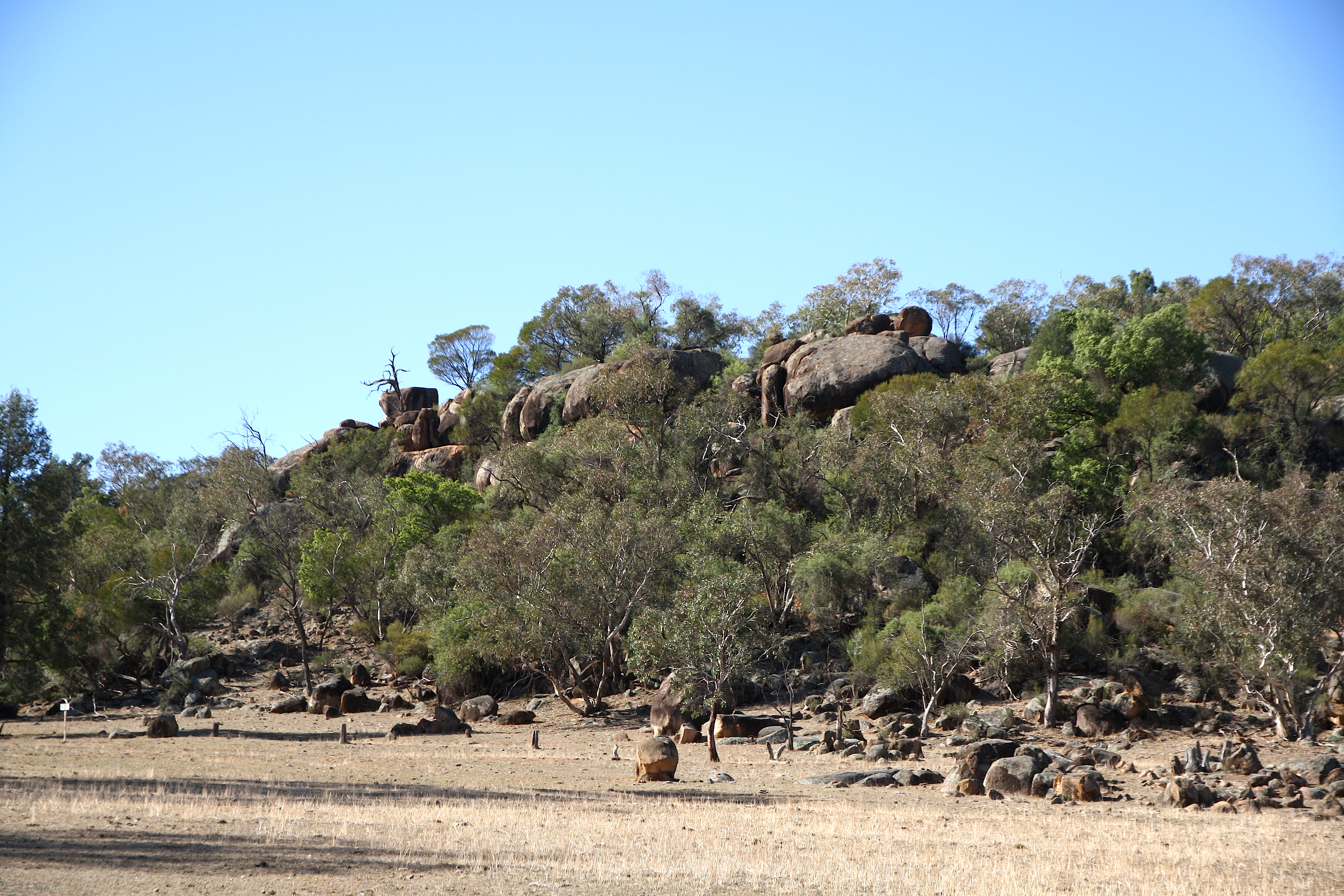
Eugowra Rocks

Situated 271 metres above sea level and 340 km west of Sydney in the Central West New South Wales, Eugowra is located in the Local Government Area of Cabonne Shire Council. The parliamentary seats for Eugowra fall under the New South Wales State seat of Orange and the Federal Division of Calare.

== History of Eugowra ==
The area was occupied by the Wiradjuri people before European settlement.

In 1815, European explorations in the area began, with the first being surveyor George Evans.

In 1817, John Oxley passed through the area on an expedition to explore the inland.

In 1834, Pastoral settlement began with the establishment of ‘Eugowra’ station. Eugowra’ is said to be named after the Indigenous Australian word meaning "The place where the sand washes down the hill".

In the 1860s, the village of Eugowra was developed, taking its name from the pastoral property. It developed near a bridge over Mandagery Creek on the route to Lachlan goldfields. The ‘John Bull Hotel’ (later named, ‘Fat Lamb Hotel’) was constructed.

On 15 June 1862, the infamous bushranger, Frank Gardiner and his gang, including Ben Hall, ambushed the Forbes-Orange Cobb and Co coach at Escort Rock, carrying out Australia's largest gold robbery. They stole 77 kilograms of gold and £3,700 in cash.

By 1866, there were 24 residents living in Eugowra village.

In 1869, the Mandagery Creek Bridge was built.

In 1881, the town was laid out and a police station (now residence), courthouse (now police station) and school were built into the 1890s.

In the late 1970s and early 1980s, more than 2,000 slabs of granite used in the construction of Australian Parliament House, were sourced from Eugowra.

In 1921, Eugowra Rugby League Club was formed and competed in the Jack Hore Gold Cup and the Johnnie Walker Cup. The "Golden Eagles" as they are known, currently compete in the Woodbridge Cup competition. A notable player for Eugowra in the late 1950s and early 60s was Ian Walsh. Walsh toured with the Kangaroos in 1959/60.

On 22 October 2012, the historic ‘Fat Lamb Hotel’ was burnt down.

On 14 November 2022, Eugowra was affected by severe flooding that resulted in damage to 90 percent of the town's buildings. Two people were confirmed to have died.

== Heritage listings ==
Eugowra has a number of heritage-listed sites, including:

- Escort Way: Escort Rock

== Economy ==
The town has a number of nationally recognised dairy farms, feedlot, egg producers and quail farms.

Eugowra is known for its granite, with more than 2000 slabs of local granite used in Parliament House in Canberra.

== Amenities ==
The town includes two primary schools, supermarket, hotel, two cafes, newsagent, butcher, bowling club, function centre, mechanic, hair salon, preschool, museum, pharmacy, GP, Multi Purpose Health centre, craft shop, as well as farm produce suppliers, post office, bank, lucerne plant, granite supply and a sawmill.

The town includes a supermarket, two hotels, a newsagent, a butcher and golf and bowling clubs, as well as farm produce suppliers, lucerne crops and a sawmill.

Recreationally, Eugowra has a showground, sports ground, children's playground and skate park, swimming pool and caravaning/RV parking grounds with dump points.

== Attractions ==
Eugowra is increasing its tourism, with the inclusion of the Canola Cup Harness Race, held during the Spring Racing Carnival. Eugowra hosts an annual campfire event as part of the Orange Fire Festival. Eugowra has murals and hosts a weekend for artists to paint further murals and hosts market stalls and car show.

Tourist attractions include picnicking and camping by Mandagery Creek, visiting the Museum & Bushranger Centre, visiting the heritage listed Escort Rock; exploring Nangar National Park for its bird watching, star gazing and flora; watching rugby league played at Ian Walsh Oval; hiking or mountain biking through Back Yamma State Forest; camping, fishing & picnicking alongside the Paytens Bridge or Lachlan River.
