= Jerrawa Creek =

Jerrawa
- Location of the Jerrawa Creek mouth in New South Wales

Location
- Country: Australia
- State: New South Wales
- Region: South Eastern Highlands (IBRA), South Western Slopes
- LGA: Upper Lachlan

Physical characteristics
- Source: Great Dividing Range
  - location: near Dixon trigonometry station
  - coordinates: 34°46′25″S 148°3′10″E
- Mouth: confluence with Lachlan River
  - location: north of Dalton
  - coordinates: 34°39′44″S 149°10′34″E
- Length: 41 km (25 mi)

Basin features
- River system: Lachlan sub-catchment, Murray–Darling basin

The Jerrawa Creek, a watercourse that is part of the Lachlan sub-catchment of the Murrumbidgee catchment within the Murray–Darling basin, is located in the South Western Slopes region of New South Wales, Australia.

== Course and features ==
The Jerrawa Creek (technically a river) rises on the slopes of the Great Dividing Range northwest of Gunning near the localities of Dixon and Jerrawa, and flows generally east by north, then north by east before reaching its confluence with the Lachlan River north of the locality of Dalton. The course of the creek is approximately 41 kilometres (25 mi).

== See also ==
- List of rivers of New South Wales (A–K)
- Rivers of New South Wales
