= Oolong, New South Wales =

Oolong
- Coordinates: 34°47′00″S 149°10′00″E
- Country: Australia
- State: New South Wales
- LGA: Upper Lachlan Shire
- Location: 254 km (158 mi) SW of Sydney; 59 km (37 mi) W of Goulburn; 37 km (23 mi) E of Yass

Government
  - State electorate: Goulburn
  - Federal division: Riverina
- Elevation: 593 m (1,946 ft)

Population
  - Total: 61 (2016 census)
- Postcode: 2581
- County: King
- Parish: Dalton
Localities around Oolong
Broadway	Dalton	Merrill
Jerrawa	Oolong	Gunning
Lade Vale	Lade Vale	Bellmount Forest

Oolong is a locality in southern New South Wales, Australia and formerly the location of a minor railway station on the Main South railway line. It lies within the section from Gunning to Bowning which opened as a single line on 3 July 1876. it is also located on the Hume Highway between Goulburn and Yass.

== History ==
The station and crossing loop opened on 25 November 1890. The platform, which was 33 metres long, was erected on 18 December 1890. When the line was duplicated, including deviations to the original alignment, in 1914, a new station building was erected on the deviation. There was a siding, a crossover and a signal box on one of the platforms.

The platform closed on 13 February 1972, and was dismantled in the late 1980s.

== Level crossing ==
In 2006, a proposal surfaced to close the level crossing near the site of the old station. Even though usage of the crossing was very small, perhaps 55 vehicles per day, there was outrage from the local community.

Preceding station	Former services	Following station
Jerrawa towards Albury	Main Southern Line	Gunning towards Sydney
