= Nelanglo Parish, New South Wales =

Nelanglo Parish is a civil parish of King County, New South Wales.

Nelanglo is located at 34°56′54″S 149°17′04″E between Gundaroo and Collector, in the hills overlooking Lake George. It includes the locality of Bellmount Forest. The main economic activity of the parish is sheep although tourism and wine is growing in importance, due to its close proximity to Canberra.
