= Lerida, New South Wales =

Lerida
- Town
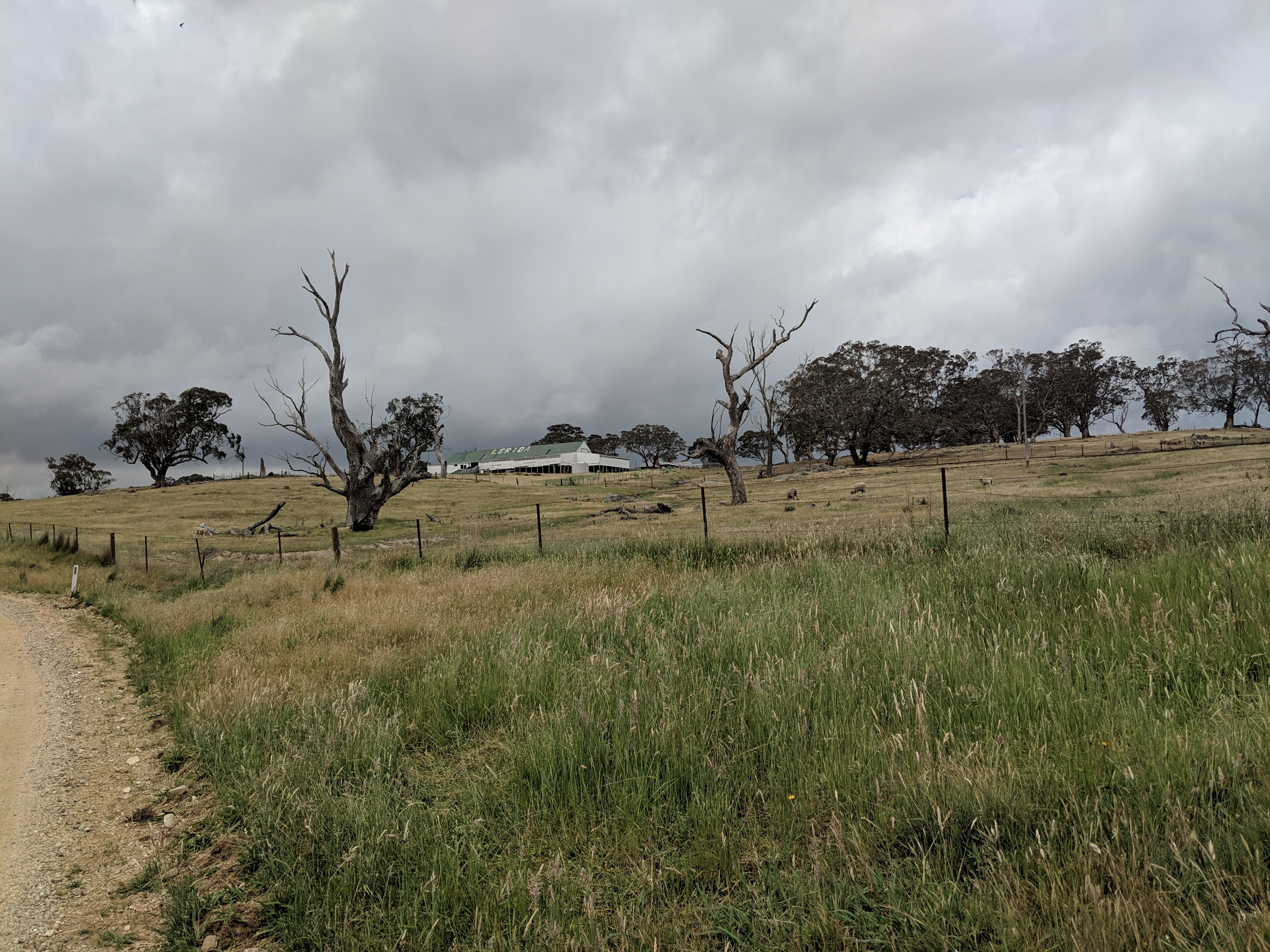
- Lerida woolshed

- Coordinates: 34°52′27″S 149°22′02″E
- Country: Australia
- State: New South Wales
- Region: Southern Tablelands
- LGAs: Upper Lachlan Shire; Yass Valley Council
- Location: 69 km (43 mi) N of Canberra; 11 km (6.8 mi) SE of Gunning; 46 km (29 mi) WSW of Goulburn; 243 km (151 mi) SW of Sydney

Government
  - State electorate: Goulburn
  - Federal division: Riverina
- Elevation: 766 m (2,513 ft)

Population
  - Total: 38 (SAL 2021)
- Postcode: 2581
- County: King
- Parish: Lerida
Localities around Lerida
Gunning	Cullerin	Breadalbane
Bellmount Forest	Lerida	Collector
Bellmount Forest	Gundaroo	Collector

Lerida is a locality in the Upper Lachlan Shire, New South Wales, Australia. It lies on the road from Gunning to Collector, about 11 km southeast of Gunning and 69 km north of Canberra. At the 2016 census, it had a population of 24.
