= Jerrawa =

- Town
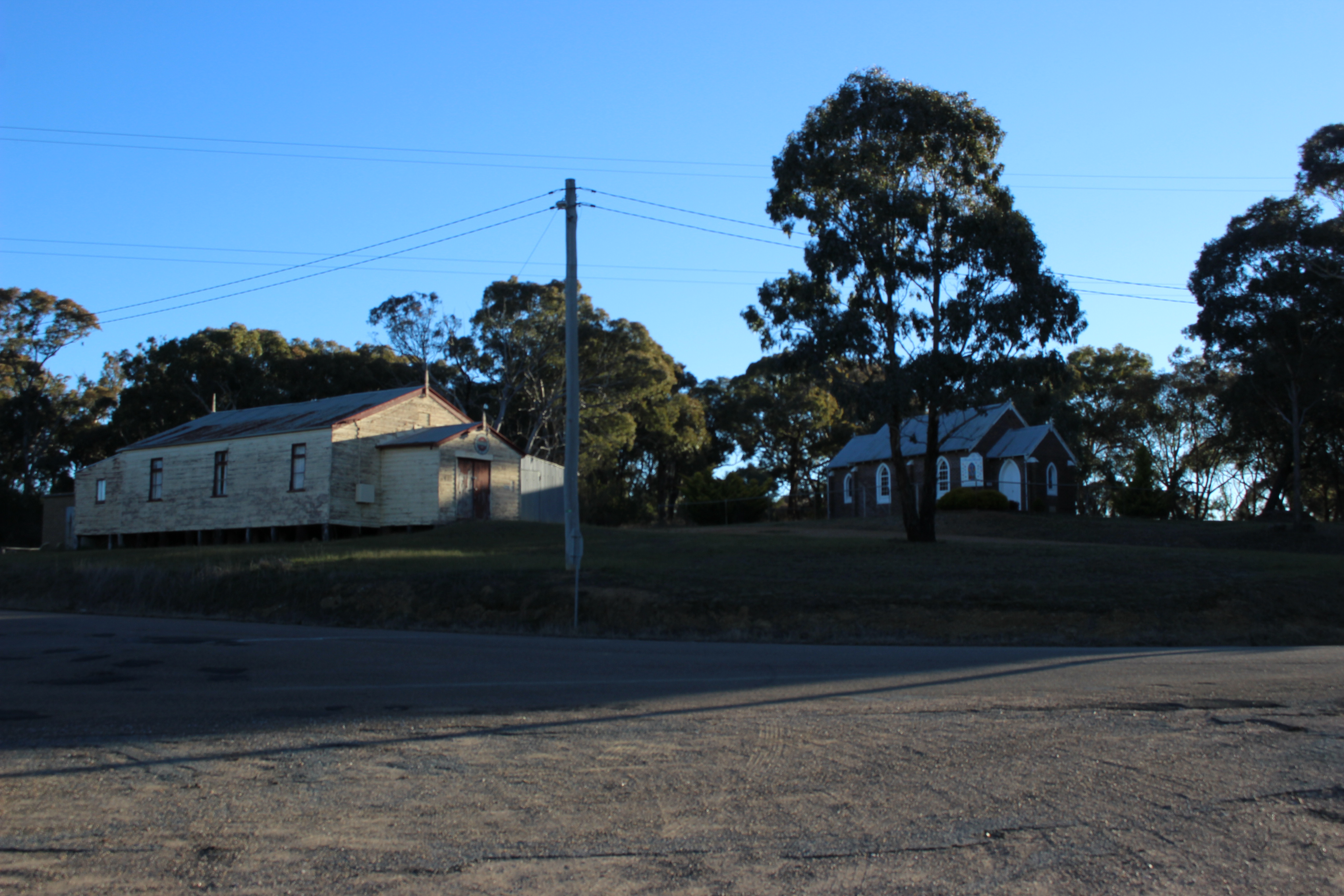
- Community hall and Anglican church at Jerrawa.

- Coordinates: 34°46′46″S 149°04′27″E
- Country: Australia
- State: New South Wales
- Region: Southern Tablelands
- LGA: Upper Lachlan Shire
- Location: 19 km (12 mi) E of Yass; 67 km (42 mi) W of Goulburn; 263 km (163 mi) SW of Sydney

Government
  - State electorate: Goulburn
  - Federal division: Riverina
- Elevation: 594 m (1,949 ft)

Population
  - Total: 106 (SAL 2021)
- Postcode: 2582
- County: King
- Parish: Jerrawa
Localities around Jerrawa
Broadway	Broadway	Dalton
Bango	Jerrawa	Oolong
Manton	Lade Vale	Lade Vale

Jerrawa (/dʒɛrəwə/) is a locality in the Upper Lachlan Shire, New South Wales, Australia. It lies on the north side of the Hume Highway about 30 km to the east of Yass and was served by Jerrawa railway station on the Main Southern line between Sydney and Melbourne between 1876 and 1975. At the 2016 census, it had a population of 73.

The area now known as Jerrawa lies on the traditional lands of Gandangara or Ngunnawal peoples. These two groups spoke a closely related, if not identical, language. The name Jerrawa is said to be a settler rendering of an aboriginal language word for 'iguana', probably referring to the goanna.

The railway station and siding were situated at a location where the railway line gradient was flat, after rising from the bridge over Jerrawa Creek and then rising again to the west. A small settlement, including an Anglican church (Christ Church), a hall, and a school, developed on the southern side of the railway line, near the railway station. Some of the houses in the settlement were for railway employees. It seems that the settlement was never proclaimed as a village.

The school at Jerrawa operated from November 1877 to December 1963. Until 1882, the school was named Catherine Creek, after a nearby tributary of Jerrawa Creek, which is still known as Catherine's Creek.

Jerrawa had a store that also served as its post office. There was no Methodist church at Jerrawa but its inhabitants used the isolated Greendale church and cemetery, which was already in existence from 1862 and predated the settlement at Jerrawa.

In August 1938, Jerrawa was in the path of a violent whirlwind that left a trail of damage a mile and a half long and 500 yards wide, damaging some of the settlement's buildings, in less than a minute.

The presence of an iron ore deposit at Jerrawa had been known since around 1879. During the Second World War, with a shortage of coastal shipping, local sources or iron ore were mined to feed the steelworks at Port Kembla. One of these wartime ore mines was at Jerrawa.

Jerrawa's hall is falling into disrepair. Jerrawa has a showground and holds an annual agricultural show, around Easter time, referred to as 'the Little Easter Show.' The old store still exists but is now a private residence. On its side facing the railway, the building carries old advertising for Griffiths Brothers Teas. All that remains of the old railway station is its sign, which has been re-erected beside the railway line.

A history of Jerrawa was published in 1985.
