= Yass River, New South Wales =

Yass River
- Town
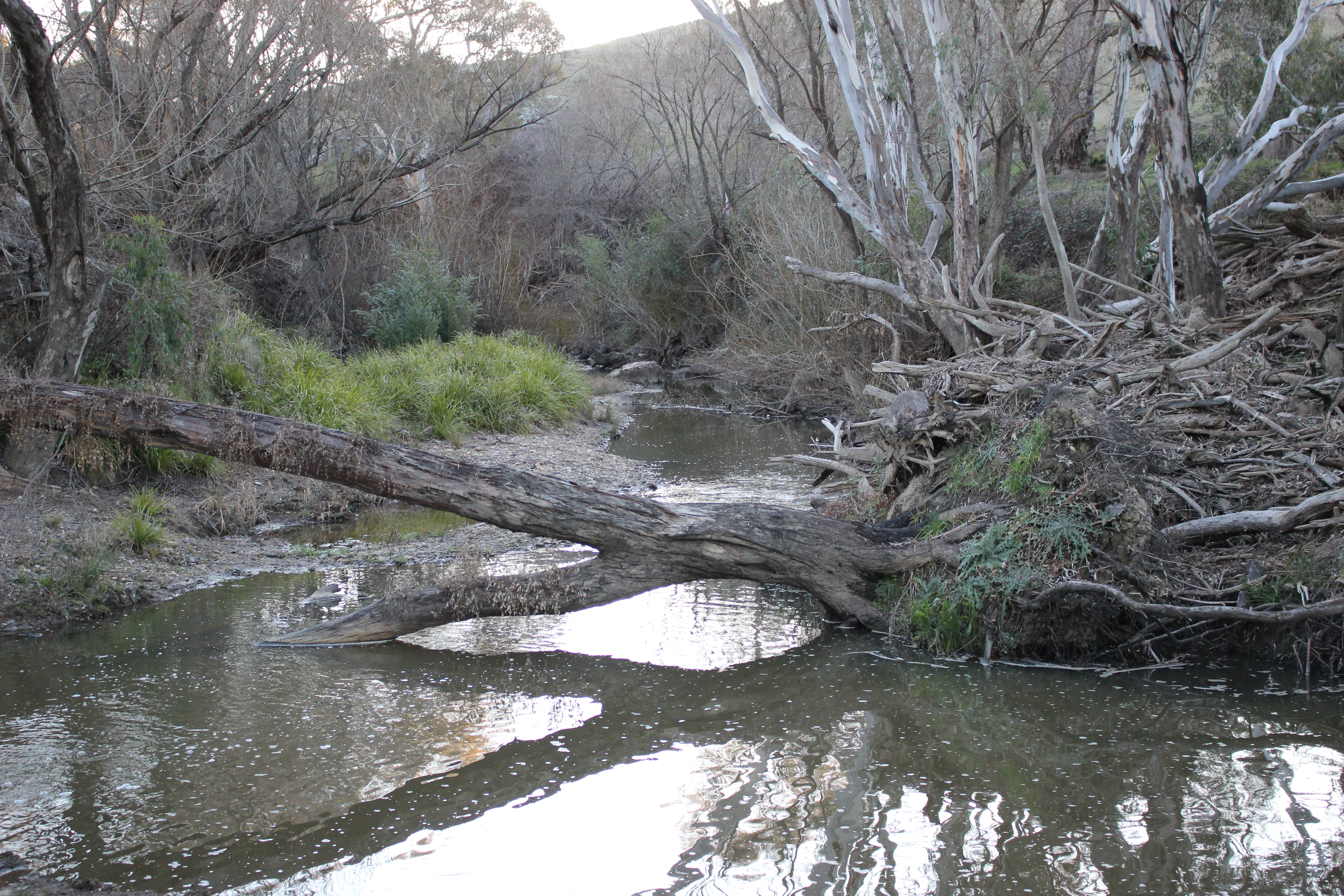
- Yass River in Yass Valley

- Coordinates: 34°54′55″S 149°07′06″E
- Country: Australia
- State: New South Wales
- Region: Southern Tablelands
- LGA: Yass Valley Council
- Location: 25 km (16 mi) ESE of Yass; 53 km (33 mi) N of Canberra; 77 km (48 mi) WSW of Goulburn; 272 km (169 mi) SW of Sydney

Government
  - State electorate: Goulburn
  - Federal division: Riverina
- Elevation: 530 m (1,740 ft)

Population
  - Total: 459 (SAL 2021)
- Postcode: 2582
- County: King
- Parish: Mundoonen
Localities around Yass River
Manton	Lade Vale	Bellmount Forest
Marchmont	Yass River	Bellmount Forest
Murrumbateman	Nanima	Gundaroo

Yass River is a locality in the area of the Yass Valley Council, in New South Wales, Australia. It lies on both sides of both the Yass River to the northeast of Murrumbateman and the northwest of Gundaroo. It is about 50 km north of Canberra. At the 2016 census, it had a population of 350.
