= Gundaroo Catholic Pioneer Cemetery =

Cemetery in New South Wales, Australia

- The new entranceway to the Gundaroo Catholic Pioneer Cemetery
- Interactive map of Gundaroo Catholic Pioneer Cemetery

Details
- Established: 1857
- Closed: 1956
- Location: Gundaroo, New South Wales
- Country: Australia
- Coordinates: 35°02′27″S 149°15′19″E
- Find a Grave: Gundaroo Catholic Pioneer Cemetery

The Gundaroo Catholic Pioneer Cemetery is on the Sutton Road opposite the beginning of Back Creek Road a few kilometres south of Gundaroo, New South Wales, Australia.

A plaque at the entranceway reads:

This cemetery was gifted to the Catholic community by Donald Roderick Macleod, a Presbyterian.

The Reverend Gilliard Smith was refusing to bury non-Anglicans at the burial ground at Upper Gundaroo, attached to the Anglican Church of St. Luke. The earliest burials here were in 1857 of Mary Hughes and Mugwill & Bridget Donnelly of Bywong. Burials included non-Catholics.

Many Catholic pioneer families such as Massy, Leahy, Booth, Donnelly & Hughes are represented.

Plaque at the new entranceway to the Gundaroo Catholic Pioneer Cemetery.
