= Upper Lachlan Shire =

Upper Lachlan
- Local government area
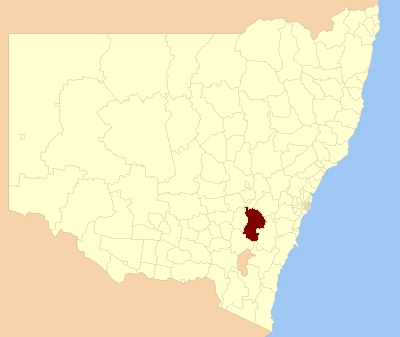
- Location in New South Wales

- Interactive map of Upper Lachlan
- Coordinates: 34°27′S 149°28′E
- Country: Australia
- State: New South Wales
- Region: Southern Tablelands
- Established: 2004
- Council seat: Crookwell

Government
  - Mayor: Paul Culhane (Independent)
  - State electorate: Goulburn
  - Federal division: Riverina

Area
  - Total: 7,102 km^{2} (2,742 sq mi)

Population
  - Total: 8,514 (2021 census)
  - Density: 1.19882/km^{2} (3.1049/sq mi)
- Website: Upper Lachlan
LGAs around Upper Lachlan
Cowra	Bathurst	Oberon
Hilltops	Upper Lachlan	Wingecarribee
Yass Valley	Queanbeyan–Palerang	Goulburn

Upper Lachlan Shire is a local government area in the Southern Tablelands region of New South Wales, Australia. The Shire was formed in February 2004 from Crookwell Shire and parts of Mulwaree, Gunning and Yass Shires.

The mayor of Upper Lachlan Shire Council is Paul Culhane, an unaligned politician.

== Towns and localities ==
The shire includes the towns and bigger localities of:

- Crookwell
- Bigga
- Binda
- Collector (part)
- Dalton
- Grabben Gullen
- Gunning
- Laggan
- Taralga

and the smaller localities of:

- Bannaby
- Bannister
- Bellmount Forest (part)
- Bevendale
- Biala
- Big Hill
- Blakney Creek
- Brayton (part)
- Breadalbane
- Broadway
- Chatsbury
- Crooked Corner
- Cullerin
- Curraweela
- Currawang (part)
- Fullerton
- Golspie
- Greenwich Park (part)
- Gurrundah
- Jerrawa
- Lade Vale (part)
- Lerida (part)
- Limerick
- Lost River
- Merrill
- Myrtleville
- Middle Arm (part)
- Narrawa
- Oolong
- Peelwood
- Pejar
- Pomeroy (part)
- Richlands
- Roslyn
- Stonequarry
- Tarlo (part)
- Tuena
- Wayo (part)
- Wheeo
- Wiarborough (part)
- Wollogorang (part)
- Wombeyan Caves (part)
- Woodhouselee (part)
- Yalbraith

== Heritage listings ==
The Gundungurra people are the traditional owners of most of the Upper Lachlan Shire.

The Upper Lachlan Shire also has a number of European heritage-listed sites, including:

- Collector, 24 Church Street (Federal Highway): Bushranger Hotel
- Crookwell, Goulburn-Crookwell railway: Crookwell railway station
- Gunning, Main Southern railway: Gunning railway station
- Taralga, Macarthur Street: Catholic Church of Christ the King

== Council ==
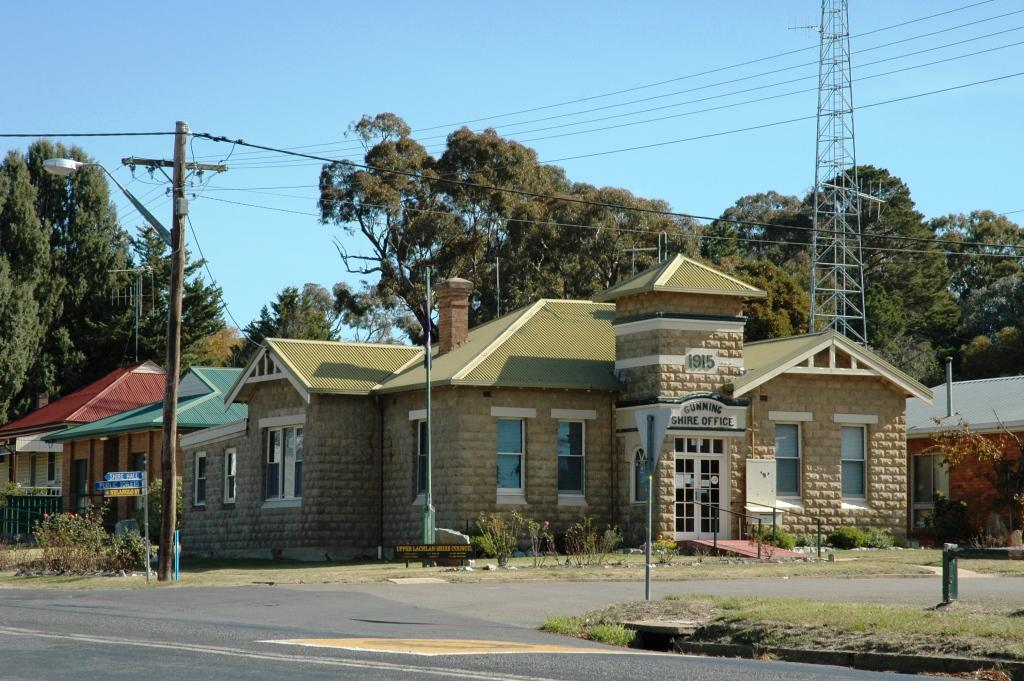
The Shire Council office in the main street of Gunning in 2008

=== Current composition and election method ===
Upper Lachlan Shire Council is composed of nine councillors elected proportionally as one entire ward. All councillors are elected for a fixed four-year term of office. The mayor is elected by the councillors at the first meeting of the council.

== Election results ==
=== 2024 ===
2024 New South Wales local elections: Upper Lachlan
Party	Candidate	Votes	%	±%
Independent	Rob Cameron (elected)	741	14.50	
Independent	Paul Culhane (elected)	741	14.50	
Independent	Terry Yallouris (elected)	480	9.39	
Independent	John Searl (elected)	471	9.22	
Libertarian	Gregory Harris (elected)	450	8.80	
Independent	Susan Reynolds (elected)	442	8.65	
Independent	Vivienne Flanagan (elected)	383	7.49	
Independent Labor	Simon Peirce (elected)	369	7.22	
Independent	Alexandra Meggitt (elected)	306	5.99	
Independent	Dennis Crowe	236	4.62	
Independent	Paul Mills	234	4.58	
Independent Labor	Nathan McDonald	137	2.68	
Independent	Graham Dyer	121	2.37	
Total formal votes		5,111	90.96	
Informal votes		508	9.04	
Turnout		5,619	84.50	
