= Marchmont, New South Wales =

Marchmont
- Town
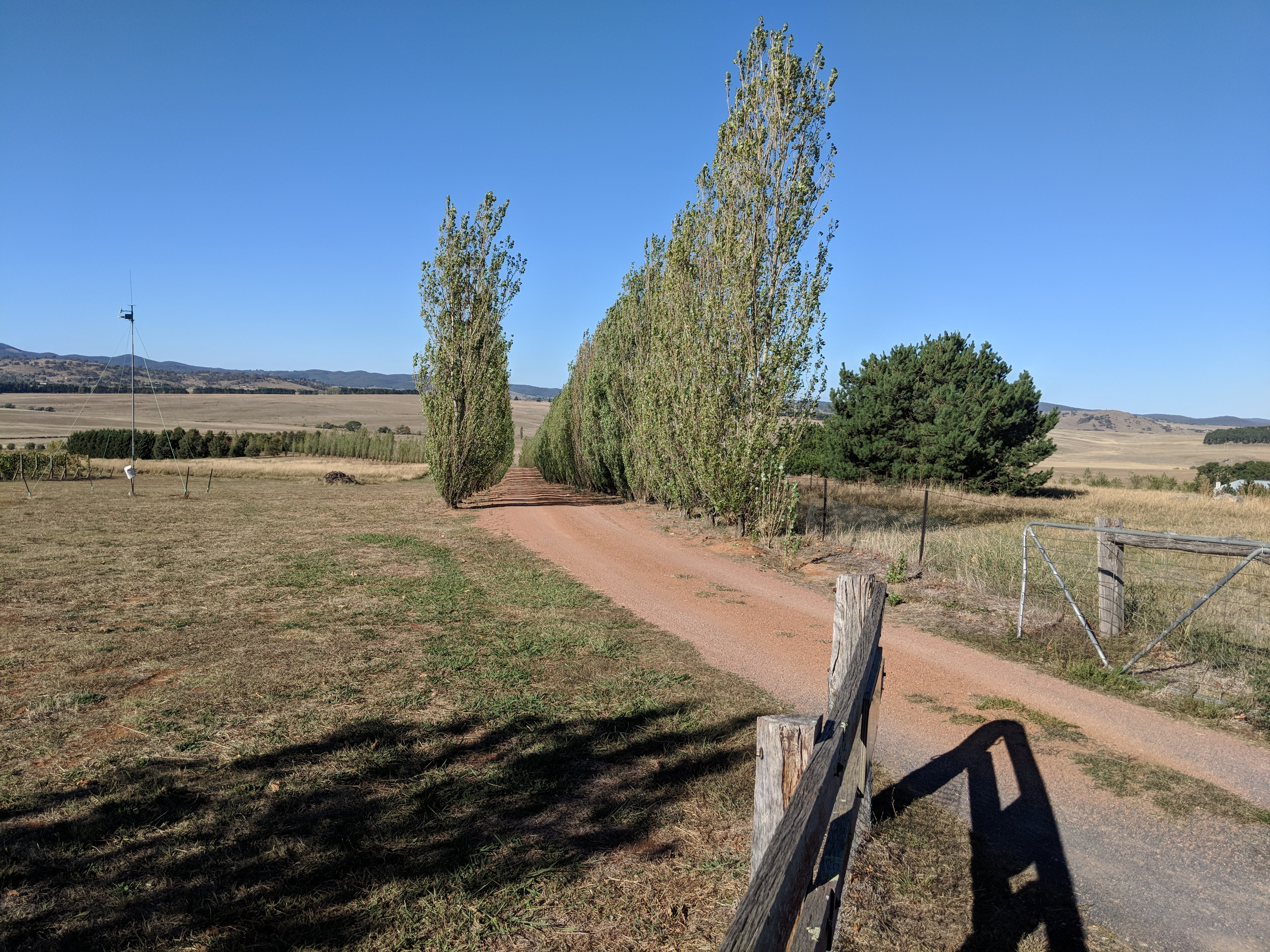

- Coordinates: 34°53′50″S 148°56′35″E
- Country: Australia
- State: New South Wales
- Region: Southern Tablelands
- LGA: Yass Valley Council
- Location: 9 km (5.6 mi) SE of Yass; 57 km (35 mi) NW of Canberra; 280 km (170 mi) SW of Sydney

Government
  - State electorate: Goulburn
  - Federal division: Riverina
- Elevation: 523 m (1,716 ft)

Population
  - Total: 285 (SAL 2021)
- Postcode: 2581
- County: Murray
- Parish: Hume
Localities around Marchmont
Yass	Yass	Manton
Good Hope	Marchmont	Yass River
Good Hope	Boambolo	Murrumbateman

Marchmont is a locality in the Yass Valley Council, New South Wales, Australia. It lies on the Barton Highway about 10 km to the southeast of Yass. At the 2016 census, it had a population of 229.

== Heritage listings ==
Marchmont has a number of heritage-listed sites, including:

- Yass Valley Way: Cooma Cottage
