= Manton, New South Wales =

Manton
- Town
- Coordinates: 34°50′54″S 149°01′13″E
- Country: Australia
- State: New South Wales
- Region: Southern Tablelands
- LGA: Yass Valley Council
- Location: 11 km (6.8 mi) SE of Yass; 71 km (44 mi) W of Goulburn; 55 km (34 mi) NW of Canberra; 268 km (167 mi) SW of Sydney

Government
  - State electorate: Goulburn
  - Federal division: Riverina
- Elevation: 531 m (1,742 ft)

Population
  - Total: 350 (SAL 2021)
- Postcode: 2581
- County: King
- Parish: Manton
Localities around Manton
Bango	Jerrawa	Jerrawa
Yass	Manton	Lade Vale
Marchmont	Yass River	Yass River

Manton is a locality in the Yass Valley Council, New South Wales, Australia. It lies on both sides of both the Hume Highway and the Barton Highway to the east of their intersection about 10 km to the east of Yass. At the 2016 census, it had a population of 294.
