= Dalton, New South Wales =

Dalton
- Town
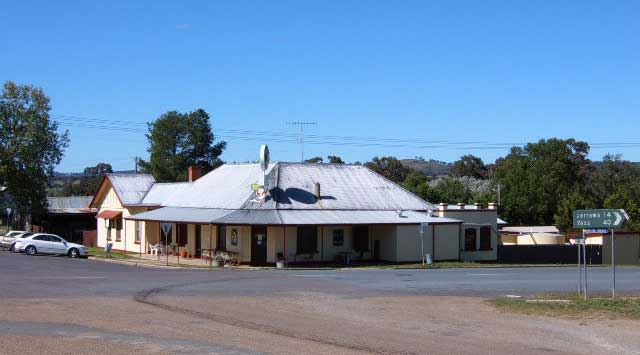
- Royal Hotel, Dalton

- Coordinates: 34°43′0″S 149°12′0″E
- Country: Australia
- State: New South Wales
- LGA: Upper Lachlan Shire
- Location: 255 km (158 mi) SW of Sydney; 79 km (49 mi) n of Canberra; 58 km (36 mi) W of Goulburn; 11 km (6.8 mi) NW of Gunning

Government
  - State electorate: Goulburn
  - Federal division: Riverina
- Elevation: 540 m (1,770 ft)

Population
  - Total: 230 (2021 census)
- Postcode: 2581
- County: King
- Parish: Dalton
Localities around Dalton
Blakney Creek	Biala	Merrill
Broadway	Dalton	Merrill
Jerrawa	Oolong	Gunning

Dalton is a small inland country town in the Southern Tablelands of New South Wales, Australia, in Upper Lachlan Shire. The population was 230 in the 2021 census.

A small river, Oolong Creek, runs through the town, which is situated in an earthquake-prone region.

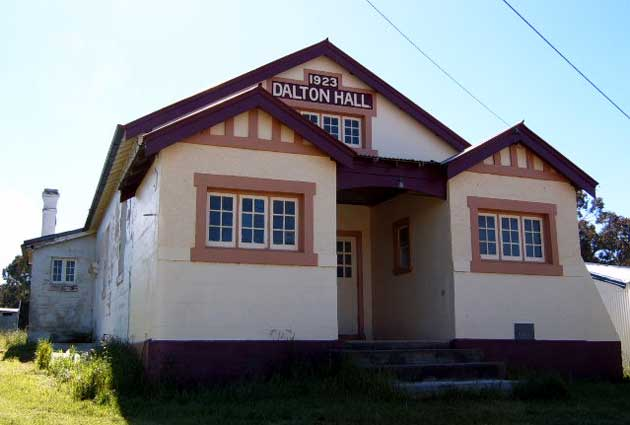
Dalton Hall (1923)

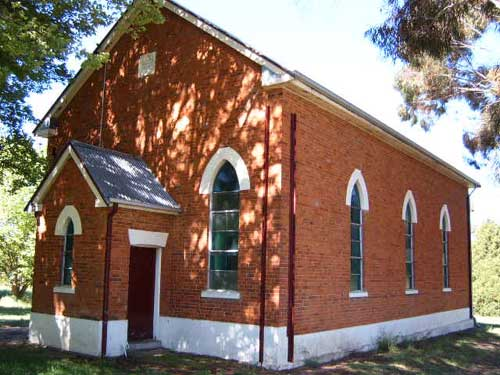
Dalton Methodist church (1923)

== Location ==
Dalton is north of the Hume Highway that joins Sydney and Melbourne, between Goulburn and Yass in southern New South Wales, 255 kilometres (158 mi) southwest of Sydney and 79 kilometres (49 mi) north of the national capital, Canberra. Nearby towns are Cullerin, Gundaroo, Gunning, Yass, and Murrumbateman.

== History ==
The area now known as Dalton lies around the margins of the traditional lands of the Gundungurra people in the north and the Ngunnawal people in the south. These two peoples spoke similar, if not identical, languages.

The town was gazetted in 1862. The name was derived from the family name of the wife of the then Governor of New South Wales The Rt Hon. Sir John Young; her name was Adelaide Annabella Tuite daughter of Edward Tuite Dalton.

Quartz reefs containing gold were discovered in the 1860s but were unprofitable when mining was attempted.

Dalton Public School was, in 1878, under the instruction of Mr. J. V. Moore, and held in a building rented for the purpose, which was very inadequate at the time. As the lease of the schoolhouse was soon to expire, and there was small chance of obtaining any other premises, tenders were called for a new building. The number of children on the roll in 1878 was 60, with an average attendance of 45.

The Oolong Bridge over Oolong Creek was officially opened on 2 August 1896 by MP for Yass William Affleck. A crowd of around 300 people attended, which included schoolchildren from the Dalton Public School as well as Felled Timber School. (Note: Probably at "Felled Timber Creek", described as "six miles — walking — from Dalton and about twelve miles from Gunning". (Note presence of an earlier school of the same name, near Queanbeyan (1875–1879).))

== Historical Buildings ==
- Anchor Lodge of Good Templar's Hall, built 1890 and in use until c.1925.
- Police Station, built 1889
- Public School, built 1878 replacing an earlier school building dating from c.1860.
- Royal Hotel, built 1860
- Dalton Uniting Church (Formerly the Wesleyan Chapel of Wesley Vale)
- St Matthew's Anglican Church, built 1878

== Geology and earthquakes ==
The underlying rock strata of the region from Dalton to Lake George some 40 kilometres (25 mi) east is geologically active, with the lake formed along a fault system running north–south.

Dalton has a significantly higher rate of earthquakes and tremors than the background rate for the eastern highlands of Australia, and because their foci are very shallow (usually less than 1 km deep) the damage they cause is often disproportionately high: events as low as magnitude ML3.0 have damaged buildings in the region.

Significant earthquakes centred on Dalton/Gunning include an ML5.3 event on 5 July 1888 that was felt in Sydney and represents the first record of seismic activity in the area; the largest recorded event - an ML5.6 event on 18 November 1934 that was also felt in Sydney and agitated the water in the Manuka Pool in Canberra; an ML5.5 event on 10–11 March 1949 that caused minor cracking in Canberra buildings and damaged the Anglican Church; and the ML4.3 Oolong event on 9 August 1984 which damaged Oolong Homestead and the Anglican Church.

Several amateur geologists in Dalton and the surrounding region have seismic recorders that automatically send data to Geoscience Australia.

== Demographics ==
In the 2021 Australian census, a population of 230 people was recorded, of whom around 4.3% stated that they were Indigenous Australians. Around 73.4 per cent of the population had both parents born in Australia, with the next highest place of birth for mother or father being England. The top industry of employment, at 12.5%, was sheep farming.

== Economy ==
The vibrancy of Dalton's heyday in the 19th century as a sheep-shearing centre is gone, lost in 1875 when the train line was routed through nearby Gunning rather than Dalton. Today the town is taking on a new role as a rural-residential centre, with generally well-maintained wide streets and churches, a school, a viable hotel (pub), post office services, and a petrol station.

The Monaro region is renowned for its sheep wool industry, notably for the Merino breed. The dry-land farming supports both summer and winter wheat, and some other cereal crops, but agriculture also extends to cattle production for meat.

== Geography and environment ==
The Oolong Creek runs through the town. Work has been proceeding on restoring the habitat around the creek, mainly by volunteers in the Dalton Community Association working with NSW Landcare.

There is a population of southern pygmy perch, a locally vulnerable species, in the creek, discovered in 2021 by two teenagers. As of 2023 this was only the fourth known remnant population of the fish in New South Wales. In August 2023, a group of volunteers working with OzFish Unlimited and the local council undertook the translocation of 200 fish to Oolong Creek, to boost the population there.

The endangered yellow-spotted bell frog is also found in the creek.
