= Broadway, New South Wales (Upper Lachlan) =

Broadway
- Town
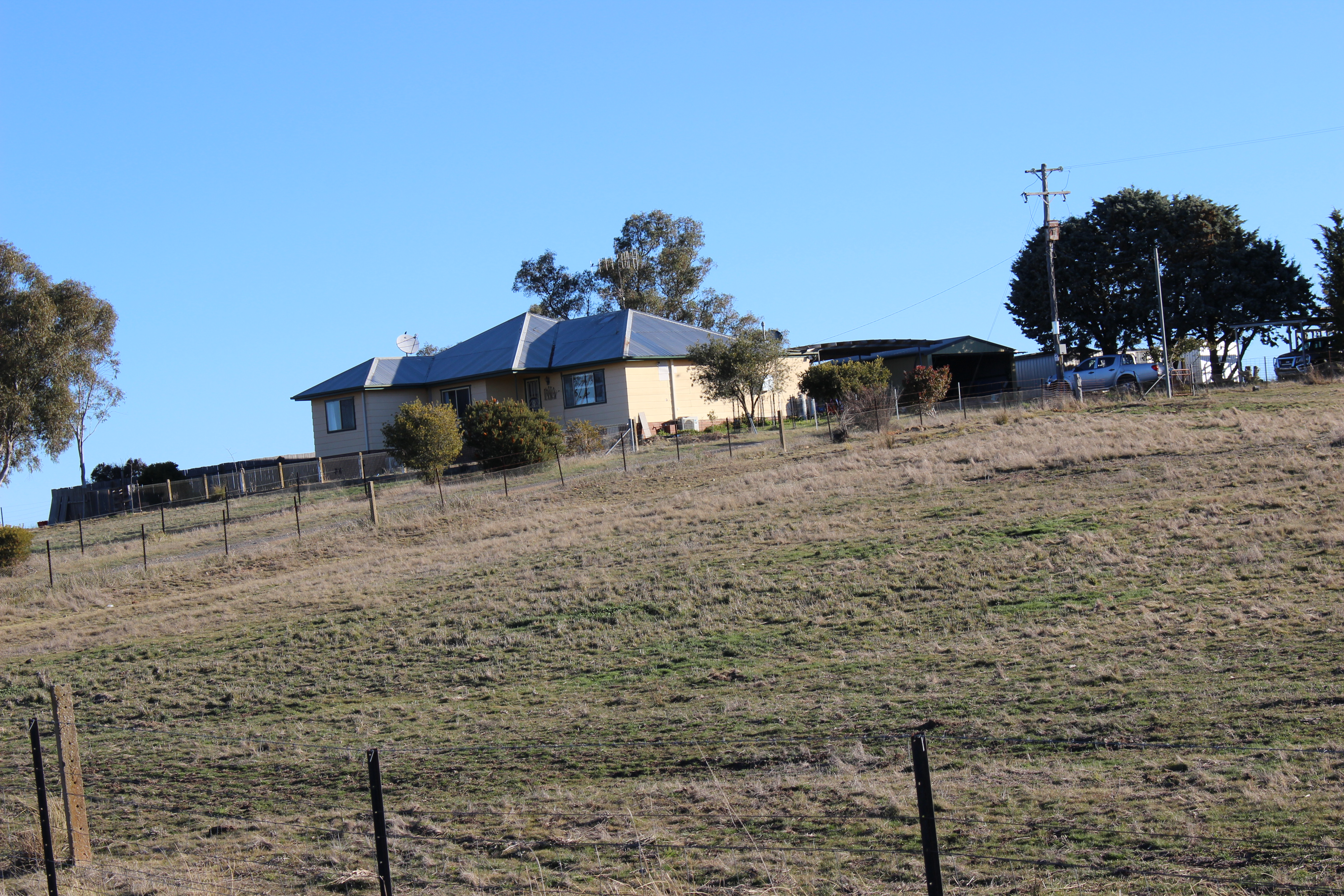

- Coordinates: 34°42′26″S 149°04′48″E
- Country: Australia
- State: New South Wales
- Region: Southern Tablelands
- LGA: Upper Lachlan Shire
- Location: 34 km (21 mi) NE of Yass; 85 km (53 mi) N of Canberra; 61 km (38 mi) W of Goulburn; 258 km (160 mi) WSW of Sydney

Government
  - State electorate: Goulburn
  - Federal division: Riverina
- Elevation: 634 m (2,080 ft)

Population
  - Total: 63 (SAL 2021)
- Postcode: 2581
- County: King
- Parish: Bunton
Localities around Broadway
Blakney Creek	Blakney Creek	Dalton
Blakney Creek	Broadway	Dalton
Bango	Jerrawa	Oolong

Broadway is a locality in the Upper Lachlan Shire, New South Wales, Australia. It lies about 10 km to the west of Dalton and 34 km northeast of Yass. At the 2016 census, it had a population of 39.
