= Bellmount Forest =

- Town
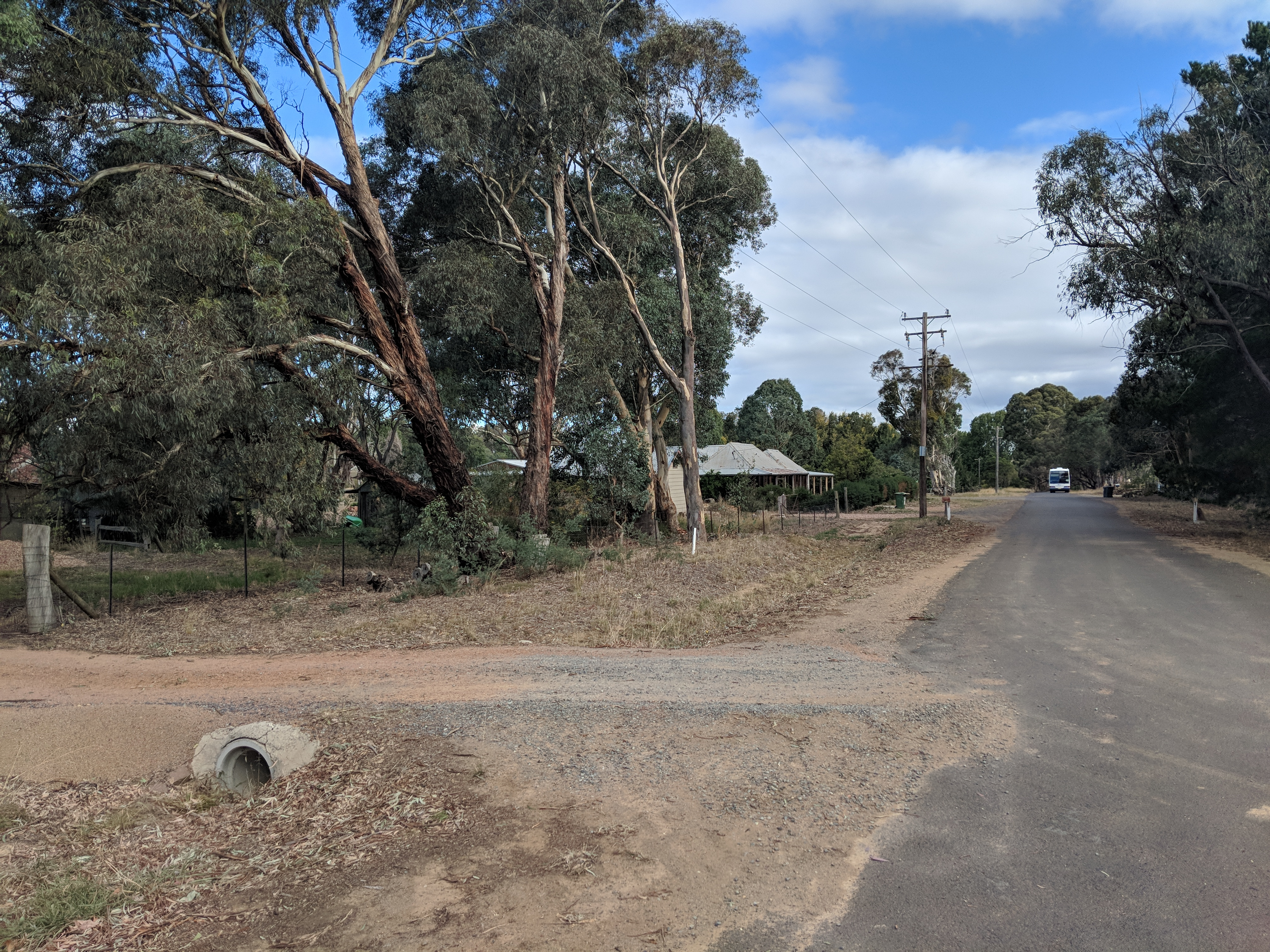

- Coordinates: 34°55′37″S 149°13′36″E
- Country: Australia
- State: New South Wales
- Region: Southern Tablelands
- LGAs: Upper Lachlan Shire; Yass Valley Council
- Location: 50 km (31 mi) N of Canberra; 20 km (12 mi) S of Gunning; 64 km (40 mi) WSW of Goulburn; 261 km (162 mi) SW of Sydney

Government
  - State electorate: Goulburn
  - Federal division: Riverina
- Elevation: 631 m (2,070 ft)

Population
  - Total: 120 (SAL 2021)
- Postcode: 2581
- County: King
- Parish: Nelanglo
Localities around Bellmount Forest
Lade Vale	Gunning	Cullerin
Yass River	Bellmount Forest	Lerida
Yass River	Gundaroo	Collector

Bellmount Forest is a locality in the Upper Lachlan Shire and the Yass Valley Council area, New South Wales, Australia. It lies on both sides of the Gundaroo Road between Gundaroo and Gunning, about 50 km north of Canberra. At the 2016 census, it had a population of 114.
