= Facing and trailing =

Orientations of railway turnouts

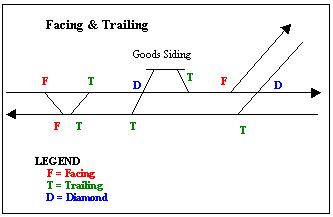
Turnouts facing and trailing. Note that this diagram is for left-hand traffic; for right-hand traffic, "F" and "T" would be swapped.

Facing or trailing are railway turnouts (or 'points' in the UK) in respect to whether they are divergent or convergent. When a train traverses a turnout in a facing direction, it may diverge onto either of the two routes. When travelled in a trailing direction, the two routes converge onto each other.

== Diamond crossings ==
Fixed diamond crossings (with no moving parts) count as trailing points in both directions, although in very exceptional circumstances such as propelling a train in reverse over fine angle diamond crossings they can derail wagons as they bunch up.

Switched diamonds, which contain two stub turnouts in disguise, count as facing turnouts in both directions and are also known as moveable angles (UK).

== Moveable crossings ==
Fixed V-crossings are trailable in both directions. Moveable crossings are effectively facing in both directions and must be correctly aligned.

== Stub switches ==
Stub switches are effectively facing in both directions and must be correctly aligned.

== Double junctions ==
Double junctions are now configurable in a number of different ways, whereby the number of facing and trailing turnouts vary.

== Goods siding ==
The goods siding on a double line (in the above diagram) uses two trailing points and a diamond. It can be shunted by trains in either direction.

This was widely done in New South Wales, though later on the diamond crossing was replaced with a pair of ladder crossovers; such as:

- Bredalabane (S)
- Jerrawa (S)
- Woy Woy (N)
- Newbridge (W)
