= Cooma Cottage =

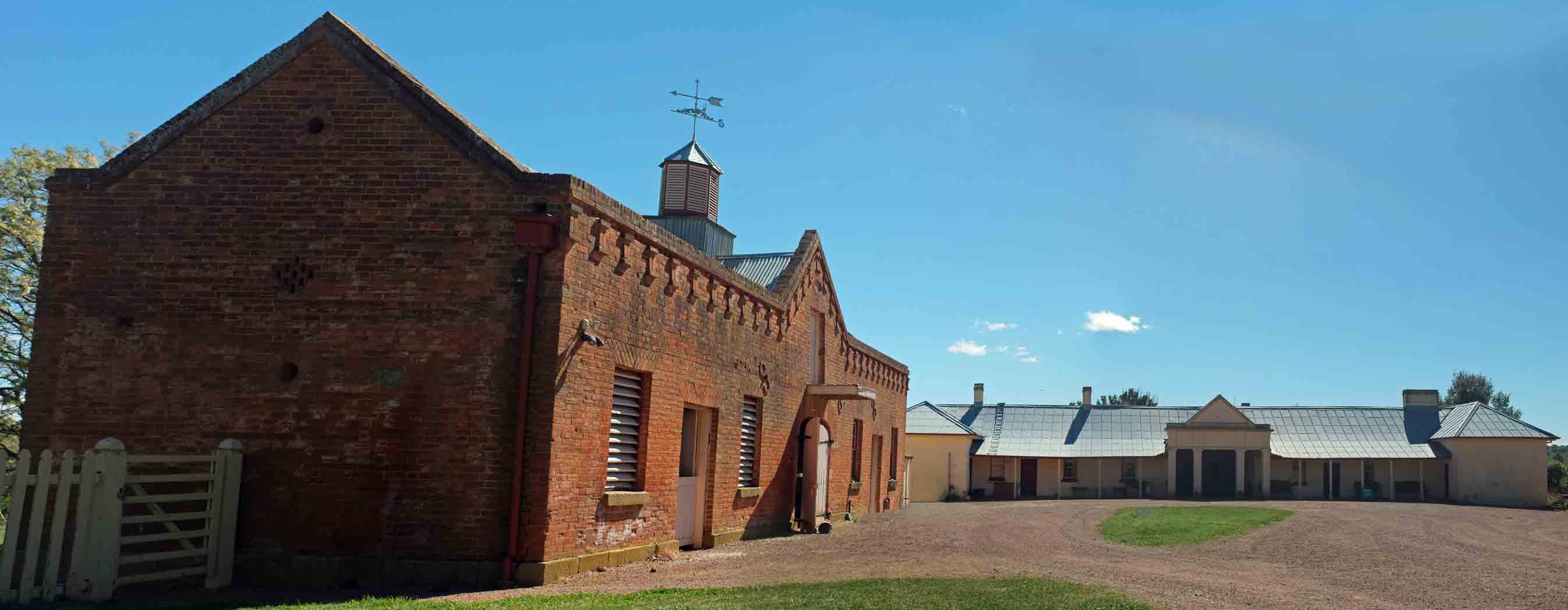

- Location within New South Wales Location within Australia
- 34.8637°S 148.9487°E
- Location: Yass Valley Way, Marchmont, Yass Valley Shire, New South Wales, Australia

History
- Built: 1830–1837

Site notes
- Owner: National Trust of Australia (NSW)

New South Wales Heritage Register
- Official name: Cooma Cottage; Hamilton Hume's House; Humedale Stud; New Nordrach Institute for Consumption
- Type: state heritage (landscape)
- Designated: 1 March 2002
- Reference no.: 1496
- Type: Farm
- Category: Farming and Grazing
- Builders: Cornelius and Rebecca O'Brien

Cooma Cottage is a heritage-listed former farm and tuberculosis sanatorium and now house museum and historic site in the Southern Tablelands region of New South Wales in Australia. It is located on Yass Valley Way at Marchmont and was built from 1830 to 1837 by Cornelius and Rebecca O'Brien. It is also known as Hamilton Hume's House, Humedale Stud, and New Nordrach Institute for Consumption. The property is owned by the National Trust of Australia (NSW). It was added to the New South Wales State Heritage Register on 1 March 2002.

It is one of the oldest surviving rural houses in Yass, New South Wales. It has historic significance as a relatively intact complex of rural buildings. It has a variety of significant natural and built elements, including an example of an early tree called the Picconia, a relative of the olive and rare in Australia, which is almost extinct in its native Canary Islands.

Cooma Cottage stands as evidence of what the first settlers built for themselves, their families and servants. The handmade bricks and crafted woodwork are the result of local skills and manufacturing. The cottage grew from a bungalow through a series of additions over the 19th century. The cottage has important heritage values as the home of Hamilton Hume for more than 30 years from 1839, after he ended his travels and became a grazier. It is a valuable part of the early development of the merino wool industry in Australia.

== History ==
Overland explorer Hamilton Hume (1797–1873) was the first European to reach the Yass district around the Yass River in 1821. He returned to the area in 1824 while on an expedition to Geelong (Port Phillip) with Captain William Hovell. Hume was subsequently granted a parcel of land in the area which he took up in 1829.

The 100 acres on which Cooma Cottage is situated was originally part of 960 acres granted to pastoralist Henry O'Brien in 1829. In 1833 100 acres in the south-east corner of Henry O'Brien's grant was transferred to W. H. Broughton for Mrs Rebecca O'Brien (Broughton's daughter), wife of Cornelius O'Brien, Henry's brother.

The original structure was a small colonial timber bungalow built by the Anglo-Irish O'Brien brothers, prominent local pastoralists. Situated on the site facing north over the Yass River, it served as the residence of Cornelius O'Brien, while his brother Henry lived to the west at Douro.

In 1837 Thomas Walker described it as a "very nice and commodious cottage, very well furnished and with everything comfortable about it; the grounds and gardens nicely laid out, but as yet quite in their infancy".

Hamilton Hume purchased the 100 acres from Henry, Rebecca and Cornelius O'Brien in June 1839. Hume, it is said, was in love with the spot and had, in fact, camped there in 1824 on his epic overland journey to Port Phillip with Hovell.

Hume was to live at Cooma Cottage for the rest of his life and it was he who added some 20 rooms to the house in fits and starts over, at least, the next 20 years. While the whole eventually came together as a Palladian composition centred on the portico it was, in fact, a conglomerate mess of uncomfortable rooms, meanly lit and with a plan which depended almost entirely on going outside in the cruel winters of the Yass plains. Except for the handsome stables block, thought to be designed by the Goulburn architect James Sinclair, nothing Hume built could be described as fine. With the exception of the kitchen block, it is hard to know what these rooms were used for; storage and perhaps strangers' rooms for putting up guests and of course rooms for employees. Hume and his wife were childless and presumably made use of the original O'Brien rooms with their pretty north-facing verandah and elegant French casements, almost like bookcase doors, opening onto it.

The name "Cooma" is intriguing and is said to derive from the diminutive of County Murray (Co. Mur) in which region it lies. The main street of Yass is called Comur Street, pronounced like the property. The Humes seem to have simply used the name "Cooma" and there are numerous letters simply headed "Cooma, Yass".

A list of plants obtained by Hume from Camden Park nursery in 1850 include a number of mulberry trees, white figs and two Moorepark apricots, with 12 common laurel trees and a selection of flowering plants, while a Macarthur List identifies early roses. Hume had extensive vineyards at Cooma Cottage in the 1860s.

Hume enlarged his holding in 1862 by purchasing 34 acres, 7 perches from W. W. Billyard.

Hume and his wife, Elizabeth continued to live at Cooma Cottage until his death in 1873, Elizabeth stayed on in the house until c.1875 where after she moved into Yass, dying at "Cliftonwood" in 1886. Hamilton Hume had left Cooma Cottage property to his wife Elizabeth and his nephew John Kennedy Hume. Elizabeth's was a life interest and Cooma Cottage was left to Hamilton's favourite nephew John Kennedy Hume, son of his youngest brother Francis Rawdon Hume (1803–88) of Appin.

John Kennedy Hume (1840–1905), lived at Cooma Cottage with his wife Emma (née Clayton) and family. Their son Hamilton Hume Jr was born there in 1875 and died in 1877. His only heir was his daughter, Ellen (Miss E.C.Hume) .

At that time the small brick cottage was occupied by a Mrs Geale. It is uncertain how long J. K. Hume lived at Cooma Cottage as he was recorded as living at Camden and at Beulah, Appin by 1888. Much of the original furnishings went with them. Some of this ended up being gifted to the Yass Historical Society and this is now on loan to the National Trust (NSW). It includes a fine cedar dining table, a cedar secretaire and two exceptional demi-lune side tables veneered in she-oak (Casuarina sp.).

There are references to two families living at Cooma Cottage in late nineteenth and early twentieth century, namely the Clayton family (relatives of J.K.Hume's wife, Emma) and the Unwin family. John Unwin was born in 1900 and the family lived there until the death of the father in 1902. The Unwins used the house as a sanatorium for consumptives in the late 1890s. In the "Town and Country Journal" of 1/7/1899 it was written up as the "New Nordrach Institute for Consumption". The climate at Cooma Cottage can be quite bracing.

A photograph c. 1910 shows post and rail fencing to the north side of the house.

In 1910 the property was set aside for closer settlement and became part of the Hardwicke settlement purchase area. It was advertised as Farm 28 in the Government Gazette on 2 November. It was purchased by William Bawden. In the following year Farm 27 was added to the above settlement purchase.

In 1924 Bawden died and in 1925 Portions 31 & 32 comprising Farms 27 and 28 were transferred to John (Jack) Leo Bourke of Yass. Bourke used the property, evidently in association with his father as a horse stud. At that time it was called "Humedale Stud" - this also stated it was owned by P.M. and J.L.Bourke.

Small areas of the property were resumed for upgrading the Hume Highway (1938 and 1962) and for a transmission line (1944).

Mary Kennedy (née Hume) remembered that in the 1950s the property included a large orchard and vineyard.

By 1970 the National Trust of Australia (NSW) was concerned about the condition of the house and had expressed interest in purchasing it. Approaches to acquire it failed, the owner J. L. (Jack) Bourke refusing to sell it to the Trust. Mary Griffiths, a Canberra resident, had fallen for it and persuaded Bourke to sell it to her. It was in a terrible state. Mrs Griffiths agreed to transfer the property to Trust ownership in return for the Trust spending $35,000 on it. She was to retain a life tenancy and intended to use it as a country retreat.

Bourke sold the property (100 acres) to the National Trust of Australia (NSW) in 1970 who leased it to Mary Griffiths. Portion 31 (the western portion of the property) was subsequently transferred to Griffiths in 1979.

In March 1970 architect John Fisher LFRAIA (of then Fisher, Jackson & Hudson) was appointed to spend the money and in effect save the house. Mr Fisher worked with Clive Lucas, architect, as his associate. Every room leaked and Jack Bourke had retreated to one room in the south-west wing where a smoky fire, elderly hens, dogs, cobwebs and dirt prevailed. Ceilings were collapsing, verandahs sagging, brick walls crumbling, damp and decay were everywhere. And the house was not a cottage at all but was over 30 rooms, with cellar, plus coach house and stables.

The National Trust of Australia (NSW) began conservation works in 1971 by replacing the roof and repairing the "Shepherds Cottage" for use by Jack Bourke who was moved out of the house. The first moneys had to "put the umbrella up" and make the house dry again as well as make the shepherd's cottage, to the south, habitable for Jack Bourke who was to have a life tenancy. The original O'Brien house had been shingled, as had some of the Hume additions, but by about 1860 the whole was sheeted in the patent iron tiles made in England by Morewood & Rogers. The tile roof was still there in 1970 but in terrible order. Iron tiles were remade, verandahs jacked up, columns added to by about a foot (300mm), the roof strutted and the large and complicated roof re-sheeted. This, plus upgrading the shepherd's cottage, was all that could be done with the initial funds. Works were complete by late 1971.

The Australian Heritage Commission National Estate grants of the post-1973 period allowed further work to proceed. In 1975 the brickwork was repaired, the front of the original timber cottage was underpinned and levelled so that at least the French doors into the verandah could open. The external joinery was repaired, sashes reconstructed and the ashlar plastering repaired.

In the summer of 1978–79 the house was painted outside for probably the first time in 100 years. In June 1873 we know that the weatherboard section was painted by John Colls of Yass. At the same time, the drawing room got a new chimney piece and three rooms were wallpapered.

By the end of 1979 the interior of the O'Brien house had been repaired, the fine cedar joinery made good and the garden restored to a plan by James Broadbent.

In 1979 Mrs Griffiths gave up her interest in the house in return for a piece of land on the western corner of the property.

The final thrust of the works took place in 1986–8, in time for the Australian Bicentennial. This was one of 13 historic properties included in 'A Gift to the Nation, sponsored solely by AMATIL Ltd.

Shutters were reconstructed, the rest of the interiors conserved and wallpapers reproduced for several of the rooms. The important picket fence across the forecourt was also rebuilt. The house was officially opened on 19 April 1988.

The National Trust's policy for the grounds has been to conserve the cottage's setting within its extensive 100 acres, and to protect the existing visual links with other rural properties established along the Yass River.

Archaeological excavations have identified changed soil conditions at the front of the property which indicated the likelihood of an early carriage loop in front of the house, and patches of organically rich topsoil, which suggest the sites of garden beds.

In 2008–09, the shepherd's cottage was upgraded with funding from the NSW Department of Planning and donations from the National Trust Women's Committee. The cottage is now tenanted. The cottage is now tenanted.

The National Trust has begun developing new education and public programs to increase property visitation. The highlight of 2015 was the second "Sculptures in the Paddock" festival in collaboration with Yass Arts, held in September when over 30 sculptures were on display.

== Description ==
The original section of the cottage is among the earliest remaining rural homesteads in New South Wales. To this colonial bungalow Hume added his own version of Palladian style wings and a Greek revival portico. The immediate landscape is virtually unchanged since the 19th century although fast-developing Yass spreads nearby and busy roads have started to intrude.

The physical condition of the site was reported as good at as at 27 June 2000.

=== Estate/ Grounds ===
The Trust's policy for the grounds has been to conserve the cottage's setting within its extensive 100 acres, and to protect the existing visual links with other rural properties established along the Yass River.

Archaeological excavations have identified changed soil conditions at the front of the property which indicated the likelihood of an early carriage loop in front of the house, and patches of organically rich topsoil, which suggest the sites of garden beds.

One nationally rare feature of the site's landscaping is a palo blanco tree (Picconia excelsa) a relative of the olive, from the Canary Islands - a large tree growing at the rear (the original front, at the east) of the house. This species is rarely found in NSW (specimens are in the Royal Botanic Gardens, Sydney, Camden Park, Denham Court and Yasmar's gardens), and also around Australia (22 are known nationally, including at the Royal Botanic Gardens, Melbourne; Geelong Botanic Gardens and at Marybank, a garden in Adelaide's Hills). This tree is endangered in its natural habitat, the "laurisilva" cloud rainforests of the Canary Islands.

=== Homestead ===
Cooma Cottage is a one-storey structure consisting of a number of different sections: a stud frame weatherboard northern section; stud frame and bricknogged central sections, and a solid brick range across the south. There is a central enclosed yard or "arcade", which opens to the south. The north section has a verandah which returns on its east and west sides to terminate in box rooms. The south range has flanking wings or "pavilions" linked by a verandah.

A pedimented portico situated symmetrically between the two pavilions interrupts this verandah. There is a cellar partially under the house, which is accessed from the arcade. The external walls are either weatherboard or plaster lined out in ashlar. The walls of the arcade are painted brick.

The roof has some 34 different pitches, closely articulating the spaces and sections below. The roof is clad in reproduction galvanised iron roofing tiles. The roof structure is battened to receive shingles below the iron tiles. In one location the shingle roof has survived.

Above the arcade (below the roof of the south range) there is a roof cladding of split tapered weatherboards. The floors throughout the northern and central sections of the house are timber with the exception of two small pantry rooms which flank the rear hall. These two rooms have floors tiled with terracotta pavers. The west half of the southern range has timber floors while the east half have both brick and tile floors. The north verandah is floored in both tiles and bricks. The south verandah is floored in brick though the section corresponding to the portico is flagged with sandstone. The arcade is floored in brick. The cellar has a dirt floor.

The majority of the internal walls are plastered. The ceilings are largely lath and plaster (in various states of disrepair) with a few exceptions

The joinery throughout is largely cedar, polished in the front hall, drawing room and Hume's dressing room but painted throughout the rest of the house. The walls in the north and central sections have been both painted and wallpapered at various times. The walls in the remaining areas have received only paint. With few exceptions the structural timber throughout the house has been cut by pit saw. The exceptions include the timbers introduced during the 1971-81 conservation works and minor twentieth century changes.

=== Outbuildings ===
A brick stables block is at right angles to the main facade of the homestead and to its west.

The stable and outhouses were among the changes Hamilton Hume carried out. The gabled coach house is considered a particularly good or fine example of such buildings.

=== Modifications and dates ===
The 100 acres on which Cooma Cottage is situated was originally part of 960 acres granted to pastoralist Henry O'Brien in 1829.

1839: Hume bought 100 acres of Cooma Cottage estate.

1862: Hume added 34 acres 16 purchases to the estate.

1890s: used as a sanitorium

1925: used as a horse stud

1938, 1944, 1962: Small areas of the property were resumed for upgrading the Hume Highway (1938 and 1962) and for a transmission line (1944).

1971: The Trust replaced the roof and repaired the 'Shepherd's Cottage for use by Jack Bourke who was moved out of the house. Later works involved repairing and reconstructing badly weathered sections of external walling and external joinery, structural repairs and painting the exterior. Some interior work was done on the north section). This was carried out under a National Estate Grants Program and documented in the report: Cooma Cottage Yass NSW- Record of Restoration Work 1970–1981 by Clive Lucas & Partners Pty Ltd.

1988: Major conservation works were undertaken

2008: restoration and upgrading of Shepherd's cottage, the rental income of which will support the property.

=== Restoration ===
The original O'Briens house had been shingled, as had some of the Hume additions, but by about 1860 the whole was sheeted in the patent iron tiles made in England by Morewood and Rogers.. The tile roof was still there in 1970 but in terrible order. The iron tiles were remade, the verandahs jacked up, columns were added to by up to a foot (300mm), the roof strutted and the large and complicated roof re-sheeted. This, plus upgrading the shepherd's cottage, was all that could be done with the initial funds. By the end of 1971 the house had new shiny roof glistening in the sunlight. The National Estate grants of the post 1983 period allowed further work to proceed. In 1975 brickwork was repaired, the front of the original timber cottage was underpinned and levelled so that at least the French doors into the verandah was repaired, sashes reconstructed and the ashlar plastering repaired. In the summer of 1978–1979 the house was painted outside for probably the first time in 100 years. In June 1873, we know that the weatherboard section was painted by John Colls of Yass. At the same time, the drawing room got a new chimney piece and three rooms were papered. By the end of 1979 the interior of the O'Brien house had been repaired, the fine cedar joinery made good and the garden restored to a plan devised by James Broadbent. The final thrust of the works took place in 1986–1988, in time for the Bicentennial. Shutters were reconstructed, the rest of the interiors conserved and wallpapers reproduced for several of the rooms. The important picket fence across the forecourt was also rebuilt. The house was officially opened in 1988.

The Cooma Cottage appeal enabled the Trust to restore and develop the shepherd's cottage. Income from the rental will be used to support Cooma Cottage.

=== Further information ===
The construction history of Cooma Cottage has been the subject of much investigation. In the 1982 Draft Conservation Analysis and Policy it was stated that the 'sequence of construction of Hume's section of the house is still far from clear'. Although more evidence has come to light since that time this statement not only still applies but can be extended to cover the section believed to have been built by Cornelius O'Brien. There seems little way of conclusively establishing the constructional history without disrupting large sections of fabric.

== Heritage listing ==
As at 27 July 2000, Cooma Cottage was the home of the famous Australian explorer, Hamilton Hume. The house demonstrates a form, which has grown from a bungalow through a series of additions-idiosyncratic, apparently haphazard, or sophisticated - to be fully united in Palladian form. The variety and juxtaposition of building techniques and materials is exceptional. The house remains within its original unspoilt historic curtilage and retains visual links, and is integral with the adjacent landscape and early properties. (NTA (NSW), 1987/88, 35)

Cooma Cottage's principal significance is for its composition of buildings which form a unique Palladian form often sought but rarely achieved in Australian colonial architecture, and for its historical association with the famous Australian explorer Hamilton Hume.

It is one of the oldest surviving rural homesteads in the Yass district and southern NSW.

The original cottage in planning and execution is a particularly good example of an early Australian house.

The relative intactness of form and interior spaces make the buildings a rare survival of colonial architecture in Australia.

It is a rare example in NSW of Moorwood & Rogers roofing.

It is a good example of an early homestead group of buildings confirmed by photographic evidence to be in a very similar form to that which it had throughout its existence.

Its stables and coach house are examples of 19th century rural architecture.

Both the immediate vicinity and the original 100 acre property are unspoiled by substantial later development and provide a compatible and potentially appropriate setting for the homestead group.

The property is particularly evocative of an Australian pastoral pioneering outpost.

The homestead forms part of a group of established homesteads of varying ages along the Yass River, those particularly within its catchment being Douro and Hardwicke.

The property is an important archaeological resource to scholars interested in building construction, landscaping and usage patterns.

The early part of the house and the land have associations of regional significance with the O'Brien family, who were important pioneer pastoralists of the area.

(This statement excludes consideration of the significance of landscaping features of the site)

One nationally rare feature of the site's landscaping is a palo blanco tree (Picconia excelsa) a relative of the olive, from the Canary Islands at the rear (original front) of the house. This species is rarely found in NSW, and Australia.

Cooma Cottage was listed on the New South Wales State Heritage Register on 1 March 2002 having satisfied the following criteria.

The place is important in demonstrating the course, or pattern, of cultural or natural history in New South Wales.

Cooma Cottage was the home of the famous Australian explorer Hamilton Hume. Cooma Cottage is one of the oldest surviving rural houses in Southern New South Wales. The place is the focus of an important historical landscape demonstrating the complex relationship of family and social connections and of the discovery and development of the area and its communications. As leading pioneers in this district, the O'Brien and Hume families held significant status in regional, civic and social fields and, as pioneers of the wool industry in Australia. The place is significant through its association with European inland exploration and settlement of Southern NSW, particularly in its links with the 1824 overland journey of Hume and Hovell and later as the site of an important local crossing of the Yass river which developed into the major road south to Victoria (the Great Southern Road, now the Hume Highway). It also appears to have been crossroad for major routes linking, Bathurst, Queanbeyan, Melbourne and Sydney. The place has historic significance as a relatively intact complex of rural buildings, with elements of its original garden, paddock systems and plantings surviving, including early trees such as the Picconia species to the east of the house, a relative of the olive and rare in Australia, being almost extinct also in its native Canary Islands.

The place is important in demonstrating aesthetic characteristics and/or a high degree of creative or technical achievement in New South Wales.

The house demonstrates a form, which has grown from a bungalow through a series of additions-idiosyncratic, apparently haphazard, or sophisticated to be finally united in Palladian form. The variety and juxtaposition of building techniques and materials is exceptional. The house remains within its original unspoiled historic curtilage and retains integral visual links with its surrounding landscape, the river and hills beyond, and early properties. The original wooden cottage, in planning and execution, is an example of the early Australian verandah house. The coach house and stables are a fine example of mid 19th century rural architecture. The outbuildings complex, early tree plantings and garden and farm elements survive.

The place possesses uncommon, rare or endangered aspects of the cultural or natural history of New South Wales.

The composition of its buildings forming a unique Palladian form often sought after but rarely achieved in Australian colonial architecture. The garden contains east of the homestead a Picconia species, a tree which is a relative of the olive, rare in Australia, and almost extinct in its native Canary Islands. This tree is nationally rare, and only some 12 specimens are known in Australia, either in Botanic Gardens (Sydney, Melbourne, Geelong) or major early private gardens (Camden Park, Denham Court, Marybank, SA).

== See also ==
- List of National Trust properties in Australia
