= John Forrester-Clack =

Australian artist

- Born: John Forrester-Clack; Wales
- Known for: Painting, drawing, contemporary art
- Awards: 2009 Capital Chemist Art Prize (formerly the Brindabella Art Prize); 2011, 2012 Dobell Prize Finalist
- Website: John Forrester-Clack

John Forrester-Clack is an Australian artist who won the 2009 Capital Chemist Art Prize (formerly the Brindabella Art Prize) and was a finalist in the 2011 and 2012 Dobell Prize.

Clack's signature is the sign of the cross plus the word Amen, sometimes accompanied by a small heart-shaped emblem. He is best known for his portraits of the human head.

== Biography ==
John Forrester-Clack was born in Wales. He graduated with a Master of Arts at the Royal College of Art in 1986. He then moved to Australia, in the small hamlet of Gundaroo on the outskirts of Canberra, where he set up his studio and teaches drawing at the Australian National University School of Art.

== Awards and prizes ==
The painting 'Dan 'the green' Knight' won the Capital Chemist Art Prize (formerly the Brindabella Art Prize) in 2009 and his 'Head' drawings were finalists in the Dobell Prize in 2011 and 2012.

== Collections ==
Notable works in collections include the drawings 'Born of the Spirit', 'Hurt' and 'The Man of Prayer' that were acquired in 2001 by Garry Shead and the Trustees of the public Kedumba Collection of Australian Drawings.
