= Jerrawa railway station =

Former railway station in New South Wales, Australia

Jerrawa
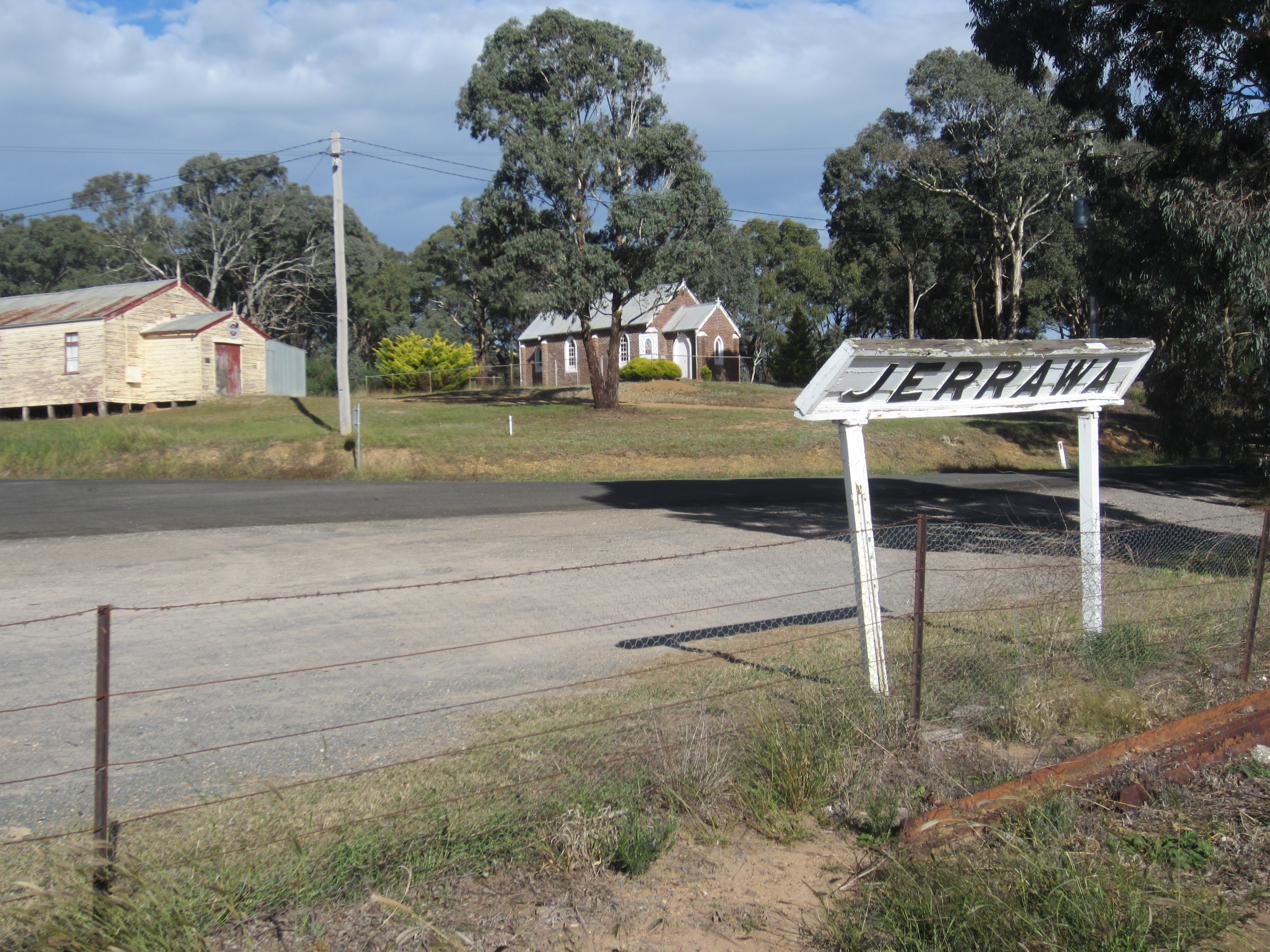
- The former station sign relocated next to the line, April 2021

General information
- Location: Jerrawa, New South Wales; Australia
- Coordinates: 34°47′06″S 149°05′12″E
- Operator: Public Transport Commission
- Line: Main Southern
- Distance: 297.700 km from Central
- Platforms: 2 (1 island)
- Tracks: 4

Construction
- Structure type: Ground

History
- Opened: 3 July 1876
- Closed: 9 March 1975
- Former names: Jarrawa (during construction)

Services
Preceding station	Former services	Following station
Coolalie towards Albury	Main Southern Line	Oolong towards Sydney
Location

Jerrawa railway station was a railway station, on the Main South railway line, serving the locality of Jerrawa in New South Wales, Australia.

== History ==
It opened in 1875 as a crossing loop with a goods siding.

The line was duplicated c. 1915, and the goods siding was arranged so that it was connected to the main lines with trailing points. There were also refuge loops in both directions.

In its final form, Jerrawa had an island platform between the two main lines and several goods sidings. The building on the platform was of timber construction, with corrugated iron roofing.

It was closed to passenger services in 1975. The platform was removed and the mainlines straightened, in 1984, but a signal box and sidings remained. The signal box was removed when semaphore signals were replaced by colour light signals c. 2010. The old railway sign has been re-erected close to the site of the former station.
