= Gunning, New South Wales =

Gunning
- Town
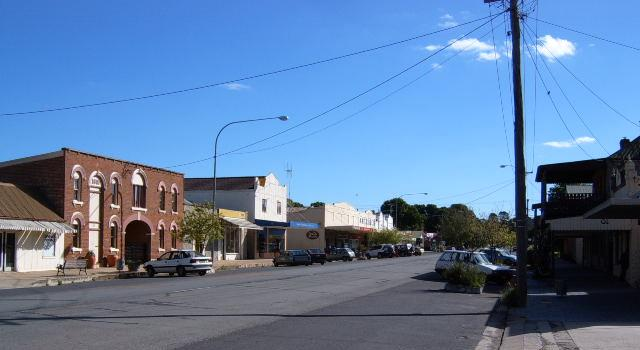
- Gunning's high street

- Interactive map of Gunning
- Coordinates: 34°46′57″S 149°15′59″E
- Country: Australia
- State: New South Wales
- LGA: Upper Lachlan Shire
- Location: 240 km (150 mi) SW of Sydney; 74 km (46 mi) N of Canberra; 46 km (29 mi) W of Goulburn; 39 km (24 mi) E of Yass; 310 km (190 mi) NE of Albury
- Established: 1821

Government
  - State electorate: Goulburn
  - Federal division: Riverina
- Elevation: 566 m (1,857 ft)

Population
  - Total: 659 (2016 census)
- Postcode: 2581
- County: King
- Parish: Gunning
- Annual rainfall: 658.3 mm (25.92 in)
Localities around Gunning
Dalton	Merrill	Gurrundah
Oolong	Gunning	Cullerin
Lade Vale	Bellmount Forest	Lerida

Gunning is a small town on the Old Hume Highway, between Goulburn and Yass in the Southern Tablelands of New South Wales, Australia, about 260 km south-west of Sydney and 75 km north of the national capital, Canberra. Nearby towns and cities are Cullerin, Gundaroo, Dalton, Yass, Murrumbateman and Goulburn.

At the 2021 census, Gunning had a population of 820. The Shire of Gunning (which was amalgamated into Upper Lachlan Shire in 2004) had a population of 2,280. The Gunning Wind Farm has been established to the town's northeast, and is visible from the Hume Highway.

== History ==
The Gunning region was originally home to two Australian Aboriginal language groups, the Gundungurra people in the north and the Ngunnawal people in the south.

The region (specifically Gundaroo) was first explored by Europeans in 1820, and settled the next year by Hamilton Hume. In 1824, Hume and William Hovell left here to discover the overland route to Port Phillip Bay where Melbourne is sited. Land sales began in 1838. The nearby town of Dalton, now best known as the earthquake centre, was settled in 1847.

In 1865, Bushranger Ben Hall and his gang held up Kimberley's Inn, and a constable was shot dead.

In 1886 the town was described as

Wheat, maize, barley, and Oats are produced in the district Natural grass is plentiful and affords good pasture for flocks and herds. The Great Southern Railway Line passes near this town. The population is 409.

== Heritage listings ==
Gunning has a number of heritage-listed sites, including:

- Main Southern railway line: Gunning railway station

== Population ==
In the 2016 Census, there were 659 people in Gunning. 86.9% of people were born in Australia and 91.4% of people spoke only English at home. The most common responses for religion were Anglican 30.4%, No Religion 25.8% and Catholic 22.6%.

== Transportation ==
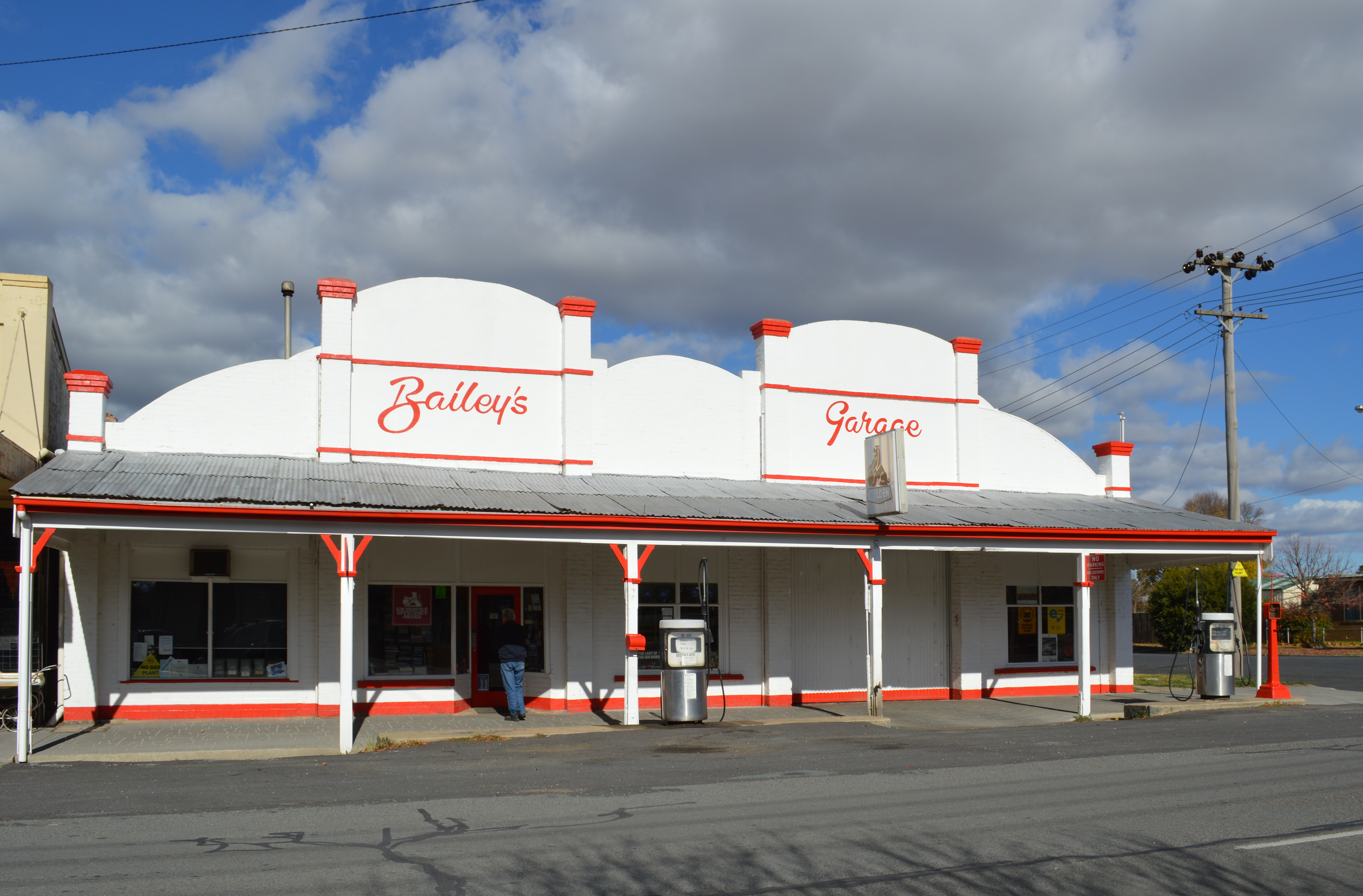
Bailey's Garage, Gunning

Gunning was originally a coach stop, and service centre for the surrounding farms mainly growing Merino sheep. It has a police station and court house, post office, and school.

The Main Southern railway line from Sydney arrived in 1875 and was completed through to Albury in 1882. Gunning railway station is served by two daily NSW TrainLink XPT services in each direction operating between Sydney and Melbourne, and two weekly Xplorer service operating between Sydney and Griffith.

Its main streets were built very wide, for the time of horse and bullock-drawn wagons. This served the town well when the main highway between Sydney and Melbourne carried cars and trucks through, until the Hume Highway by-pass was completed on 5 April 1993. The town has been able to resume a more rural pace of life, and develop something of an industry in providing bed and breakfast accommodation.

The establishment of the main trunk telegraph line is remembered by the Telegraph Hotel.

== Attractions ==
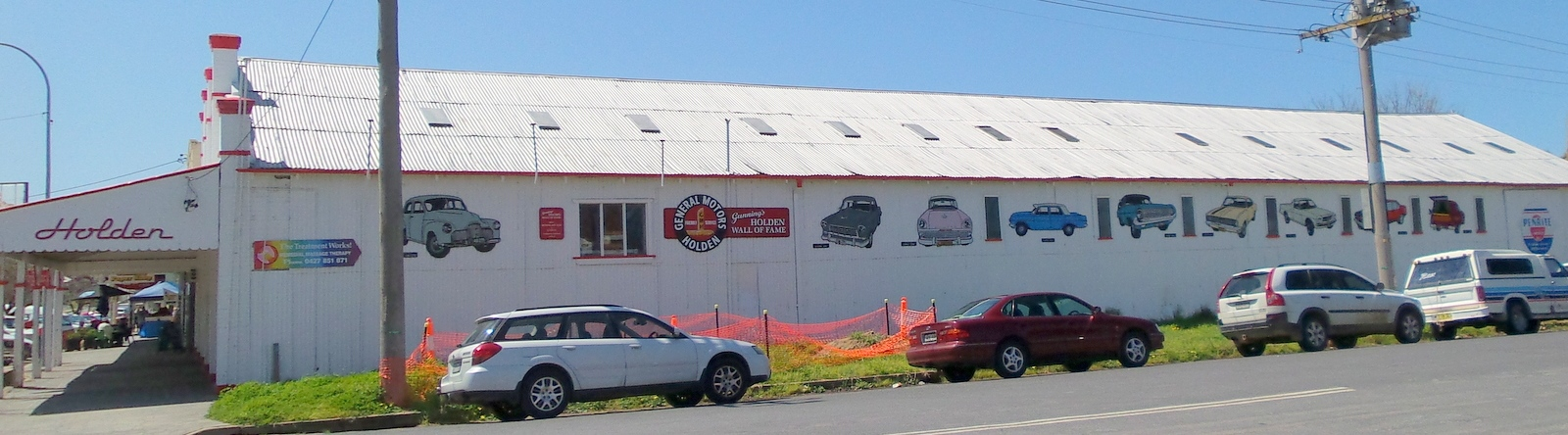

A feature of the town is Bailey's Garage, once a very busy Holden dealership. One long exterior wall carries large images of nine notable Holden models.

== Climate ==
Rainfall records have been kept since 1886 at the Gunning Rural Supplies, elevation 578 metres (1,896 ft). It is generally wetter than Goulburn, particularly in the winter and early spring, though not as pronounced as that in Yass.

Climate data for Gunning Rural Supplies (1886–2024); 578 m AMSL; 34.78° S, 149.27° E
Month	Jan	Feb	Mar	Apr	May	Jun	Jul	Aug	Sep	Oct	Nov	Dec	Year
Average rainfall mm (inches)	57.1 (2.25)	45.9 (1.81)	51.5 (2.03)	47.1 (1.85)	48.7 (1.92)	56.7 (2.23)	53.6 (2.11)	56.2 (2.21)	55.7 (2.19)	60.9 (2.40)	58.8 (2.31)	57.5 (2.26)	658.3 (25.92)
Source: Australian Bureau of Meteorology; Gunning Rural Supplies

== Notable residents ==
- Millicent Armstrong was a playwright and farmer in Gunning, New South Wales, who wrote primarily about the experiences of country life in early 20th century Australia. The plays she wrote while living in Gunning were well received and prize-winning.

== Gallery ==
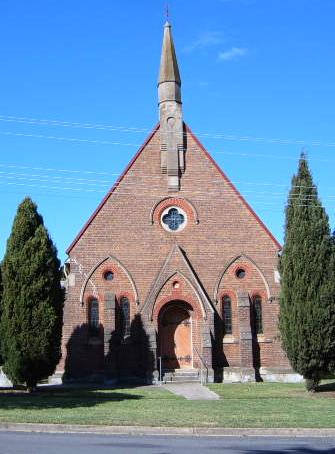
Uniting Church, Gunning

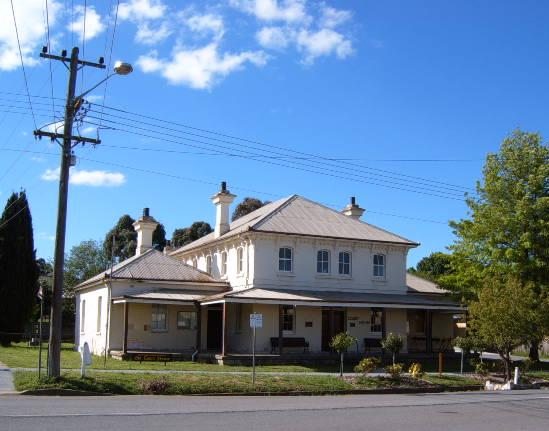
Old Gunning Court House

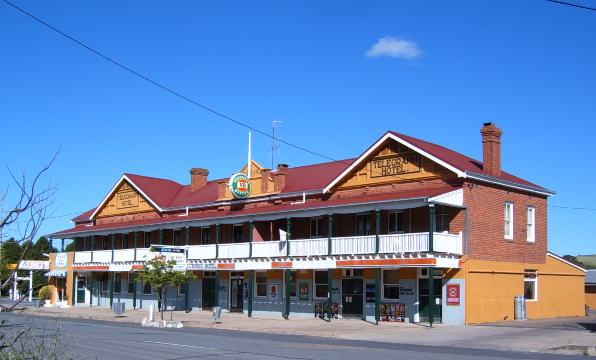
Telegraph Hotel, Gunning

Old St Francis Xavier Church, Gunning

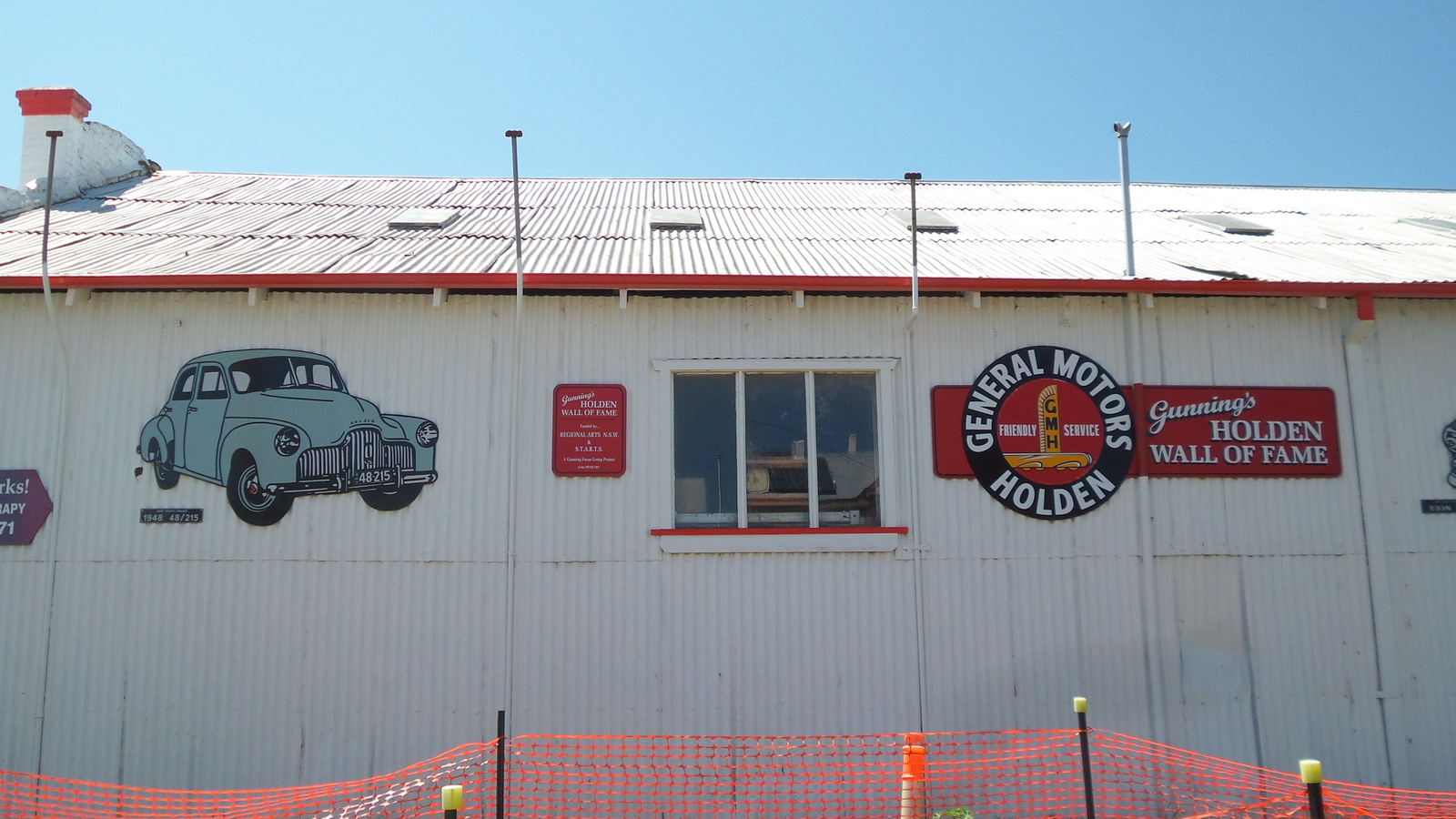
Holden Wall of Fame 1948 model 215 "FX"

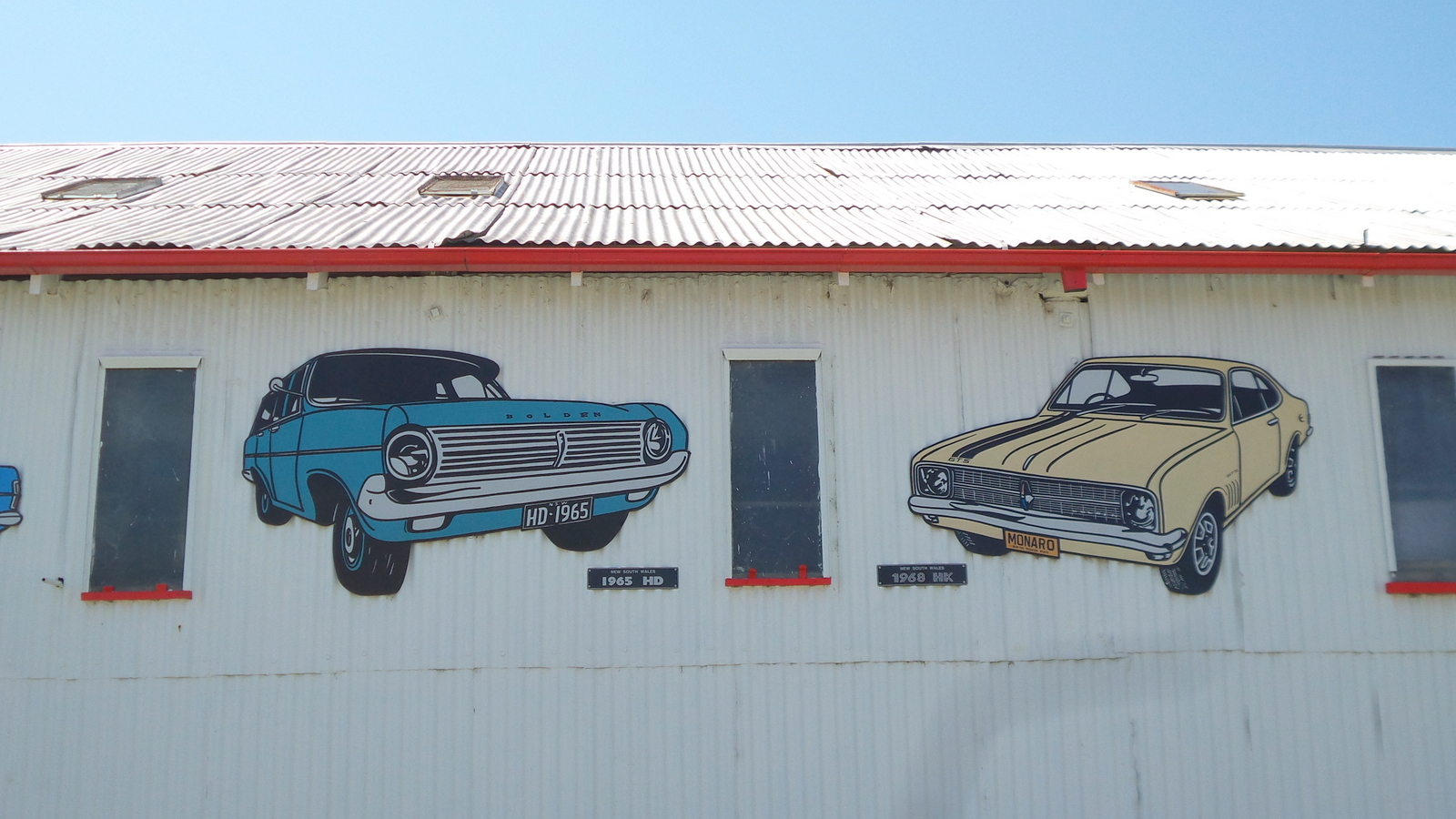
Holden Wall of Fame 1965 HD and 1968 HK
