= Gunning railway station =

Railway station in New South Wales, Australia

Gunning
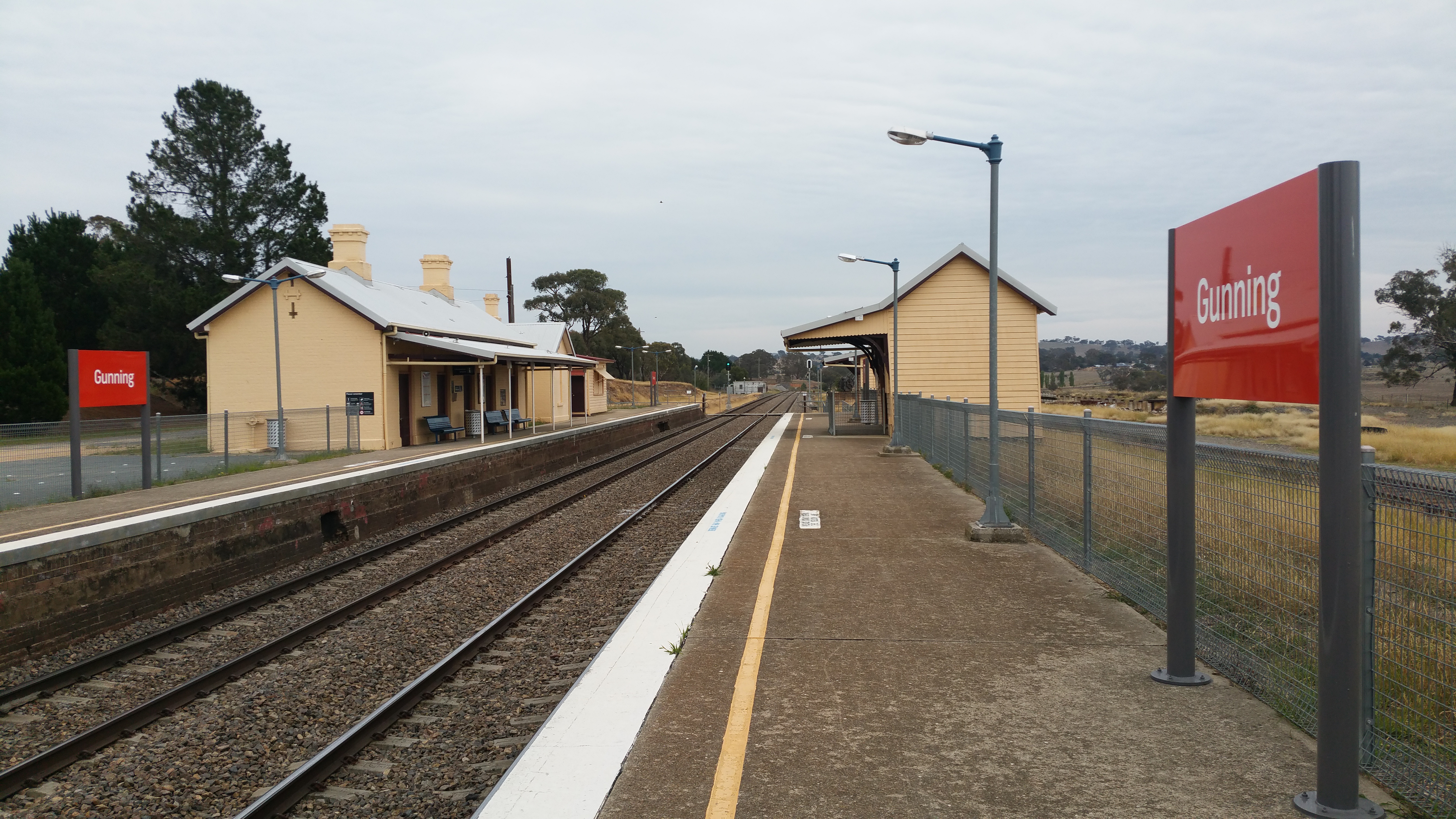
- Southbound view from platforms in March 2016

General information
- Location: Biala Street, Gunning; Australia
- Coordinates: 34°46′47″S 149°15′40″E
- Owner: Transport Asset Manager of New South Wales
- Operator: NSW TrainLink
- Line: Main Southern
- Distance: 278.60 km (173.11 mi) from Central
- Platforms: 2 side
- Tracks: 2

Construction
- Structure type: Ground
- Accessible: Assisted access

Other information
- Station code: GNI

History
- Opened: 9 November 1875

Services
Preceding station	NSW TrainLink	Following station
Yass Junction towards Griffith	NSW TrainLink Southern Line Griffith Xplorer	Goulburn towards Sydney
Yass Junction towards Melbourne	NSW TrainLink Southern Line Melbourne XPT	Goulburn towards Sydney
Former services
Preceding station	Former services	Following station
Former NSW Main line services
Oolong towards Albury	Main Southern Line	Fish River towards Sydney

New South Wales Heritage Register
- Official name: Gunning Railway Station and yard group
- Type: State heritage (complex / group)
- Designated: 2 April 1999
- Reference no.: 1162
- Type: Railway Platform / Station
- Category: Transport – Rail
Location

Gunning railway station is a heritage-listed railway station located on the Main Southern line serving the town of Gunning, New South Wales, Australia. The property was added to the New South Wales State Heritage Register on 2 April 1999, described as the Gunning Railway Station and yard group.

== History ==
The line from Goulburn to Yass was contracted to be completed by 31 December 1875 however, "as soon as the line was sufficiently advanced, arrangements could be made to open it to Gunning". As a result, Gunning station officially opened on 9 November 1875 (however, freight traffic commenced operations on 2 November 1875) when the Main South line was extended from Goulburn. Gunning appeared in the timetable published on 20 January 1876 with a twice-daily service. The journey time (from Sydney) was a little over 8 hours.

Gunning served as the terminus until the line was extended to Bowning on 3 July 1876. A second platform was added in 1913 when the line was duplicated.

== Services ==
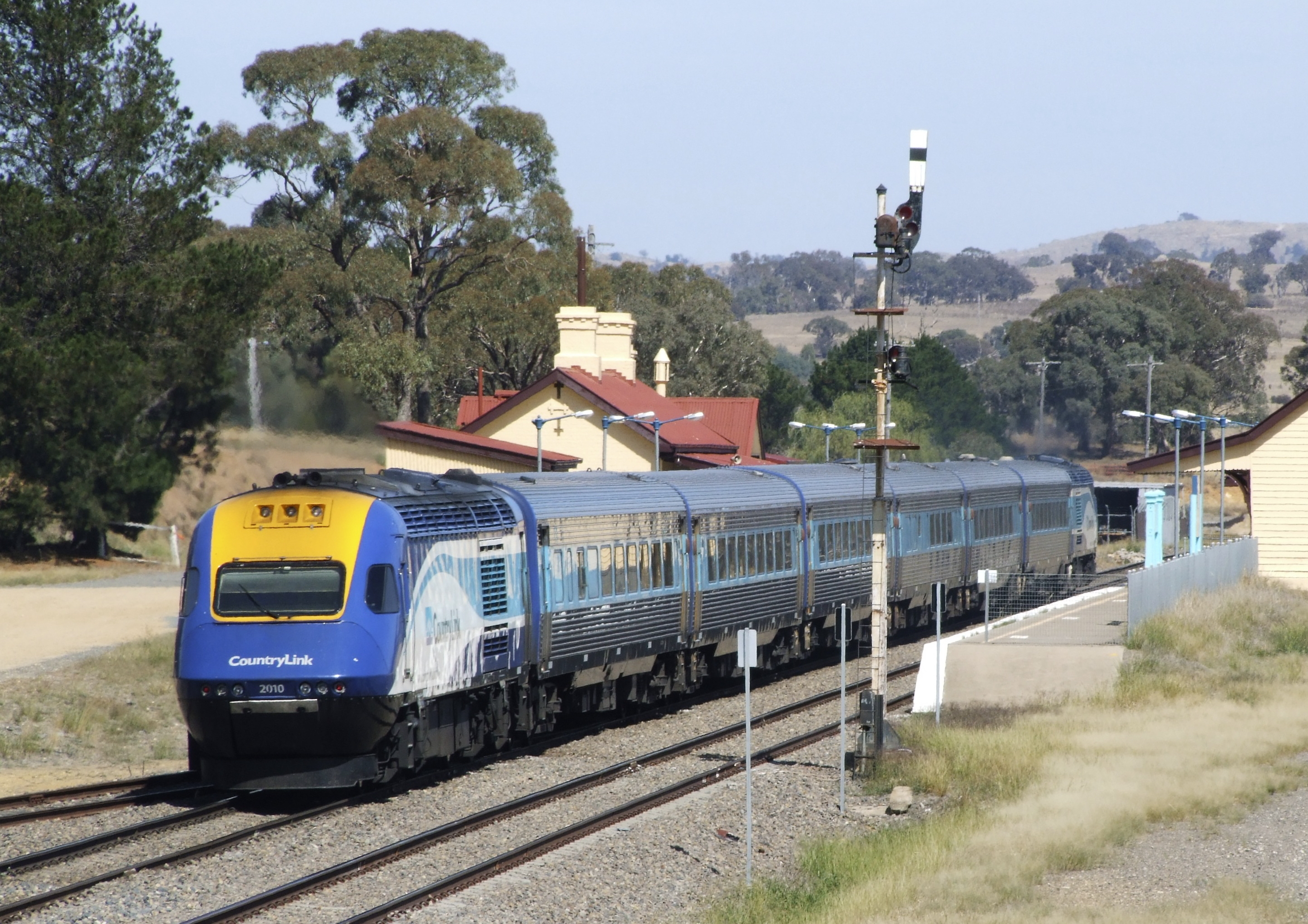
Gunning is served twice daily by an each-way Sydney–Melbourne XPT and twice weekly by an Xplorer railcar to and from Griffith

From October 20 2024, Gunning is now served by two daily NSW TrainLink XPT services in each direction operating between Sydney and Melbourne, and a twice weekly NSW TrainLink Xplorer between Griffith and Sydney split from Canberra services at Goulburn. This station is a request stop, so the train stops only if passengers booked to board/alight here.

Platform	Line	Stopping pattern	Notes
1	Southern Region	Services to Sydney Central, Griffith & Melbourne	request stop (booked passengers only)

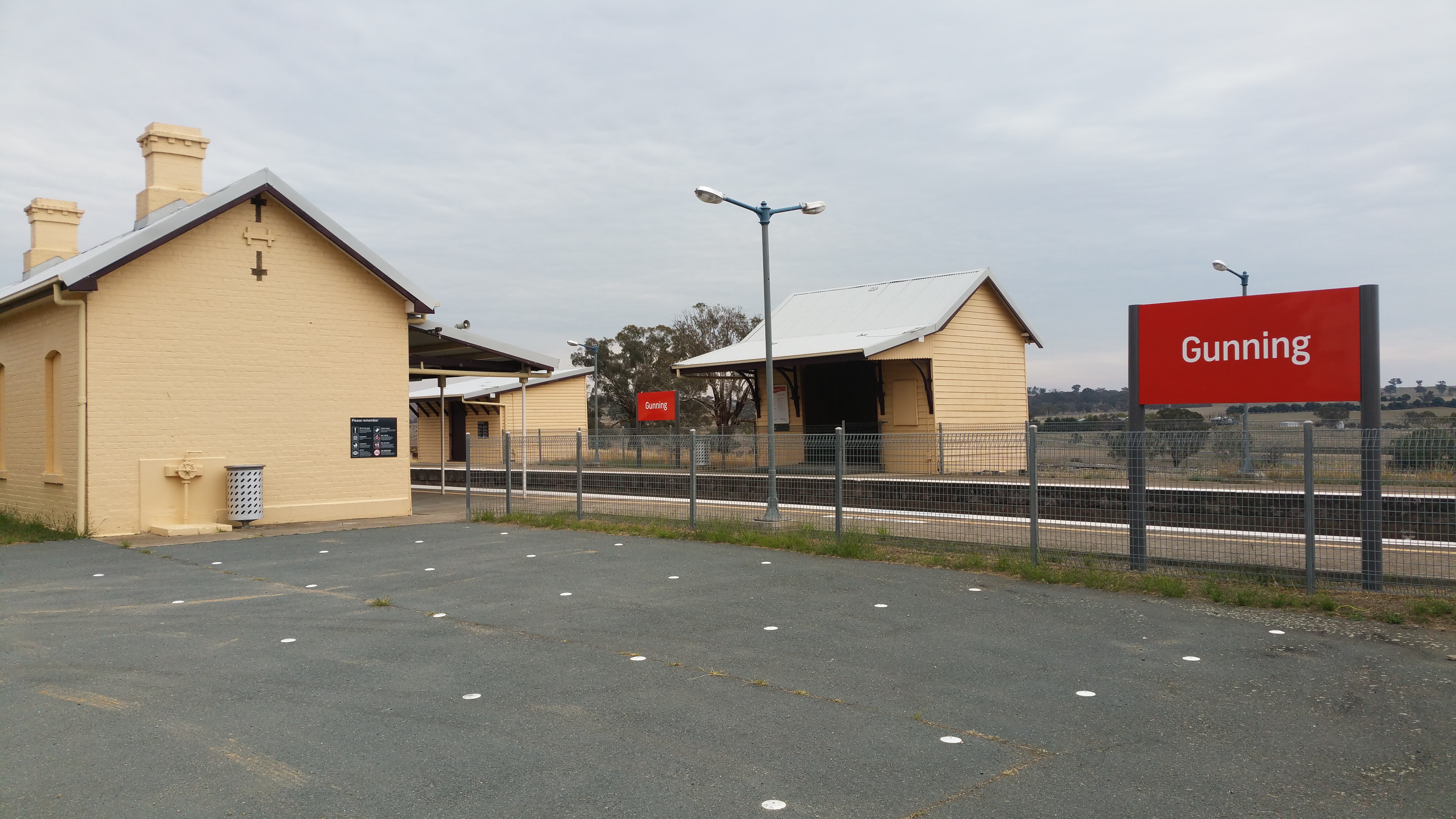
Entrance and Platform buildings

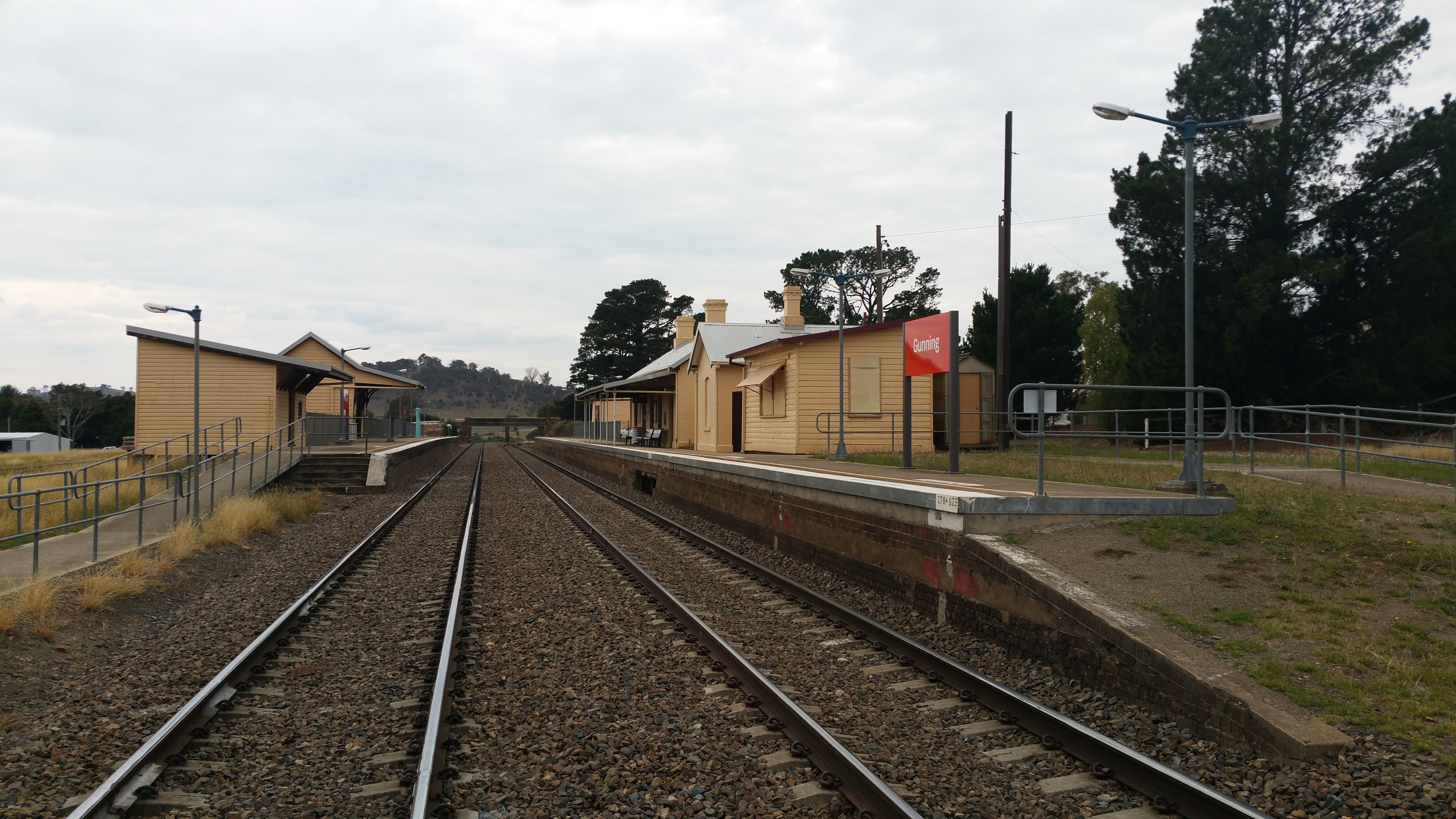
Platforms seen from railway crossing

== Description ==
The complex comprises a series of station buildings including a type 4, standard roadside station, erected in 1875; a type 11, station building, duplication, erected in 1913; a type 3 signal box, with a timber skillion roof building on platform, completed in 1913; an out shed, completed in 1913; and a per way shed of corrugated galvanised iron, that is no longer extant. Other structures include brick platform faces, erected in 1875 and 1915; and a dock platform. Artefacts include closing keys for signal frame, (AA08), signal box - the signal box was decommissioned (prior to 2004, date unknown).

== Heritage listing ==
Gunning station group is one of the best surviving examples of a small late Victorian country station complex with elements from the opening of the line in 1875 (when it was terminus for a year) through to 1913, when the last building on the site was added. It clearly demonstrates the changes from single track to double track operation in 1915 with addition of a second platform and more complex signalling arrangements. It exhibits a confidence in railway building and its importance in the development of the country by the scale of the buildings, particularly the station master's residence. It presents as a reasonably intact site with all of the major elements still evident. The original station building was an early prototype of standardised design in station buildings.

The Gunning railway station was listed on the New South Wales State Heritage Register in 1999 having satisfied the criterion: "The place possesses uncommon, rare or endangered aspects of the cultural or natural history of New South Wales." It was assessed as historically, scientifically, architecturally and socially rare.
