= Lade Vale =

- Town
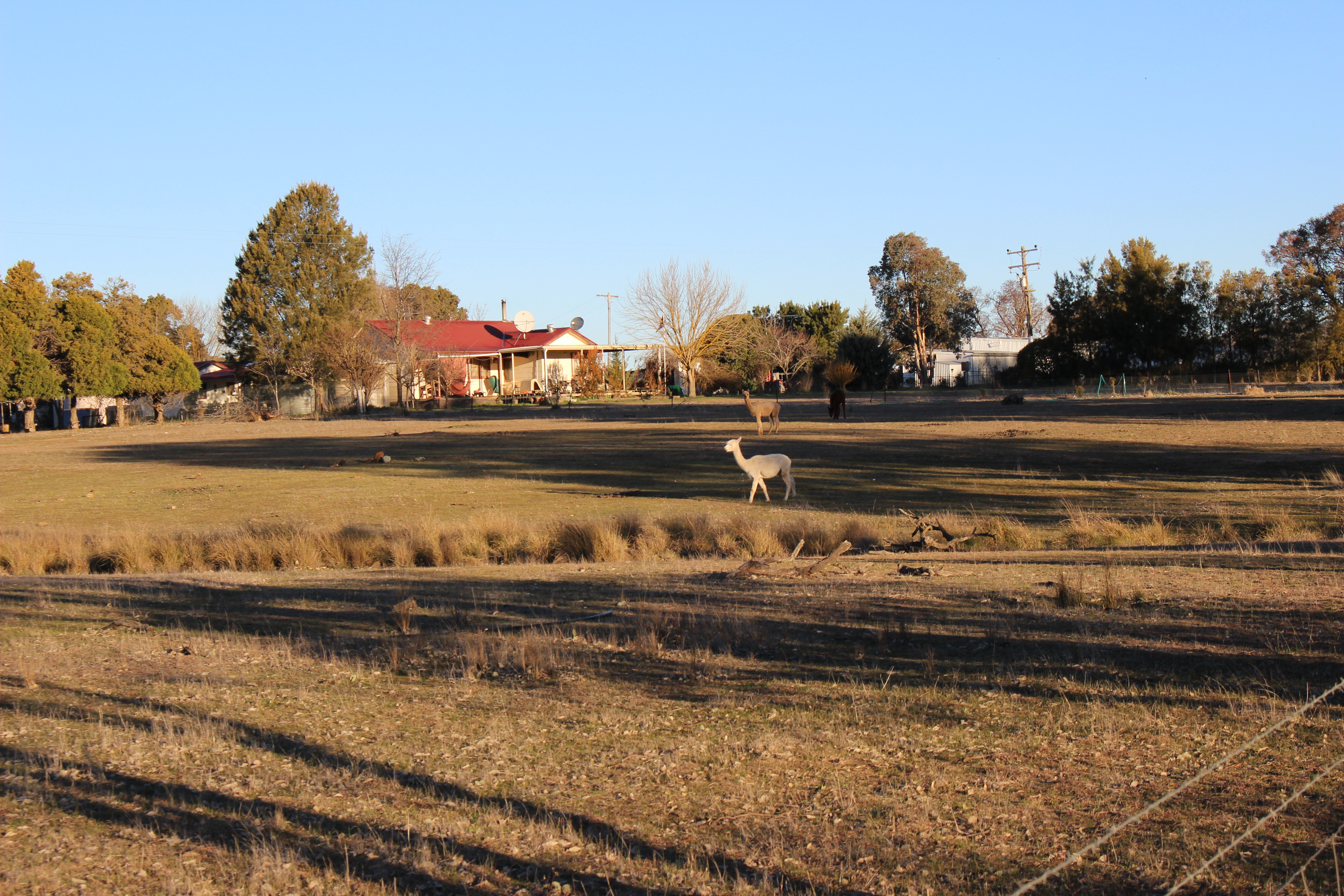

- Coordinates: 34°50′49″S 149°09′05″E
- Country: Australia
- State: New South Wales
- Region: Southern Tablelands
- LGA: Upper Lachlan Shire
- Location: 35 km (22 mi) E of Yass; 67 km (42 mi) W of Goulburn; 261 km (162 mi) SW of Sydney

Government
  - State electorate: Goulburn
  - Federal division: Riverina
- Elevation: 632 m (2,073 ft)

Population
  - Total: 158 (SAL 2021)
- Postcode: 2581
- County: King
- Parish: Bunton
Localities around Lade Vale
Jerrawa	Jerrawa	Oolong
Manton	Lade Vale	Gunning
Manton	Yass River	Yass River

Lade Vale is a locality in the Upper Lachlan Shire, New South Wales, Australia. It lies on the south side of the Hume Highway about 30 km to the east of Yass. At the 2016 census, it had a population of 128.
