= Merrill, New South Wales =

Merrill
- Town
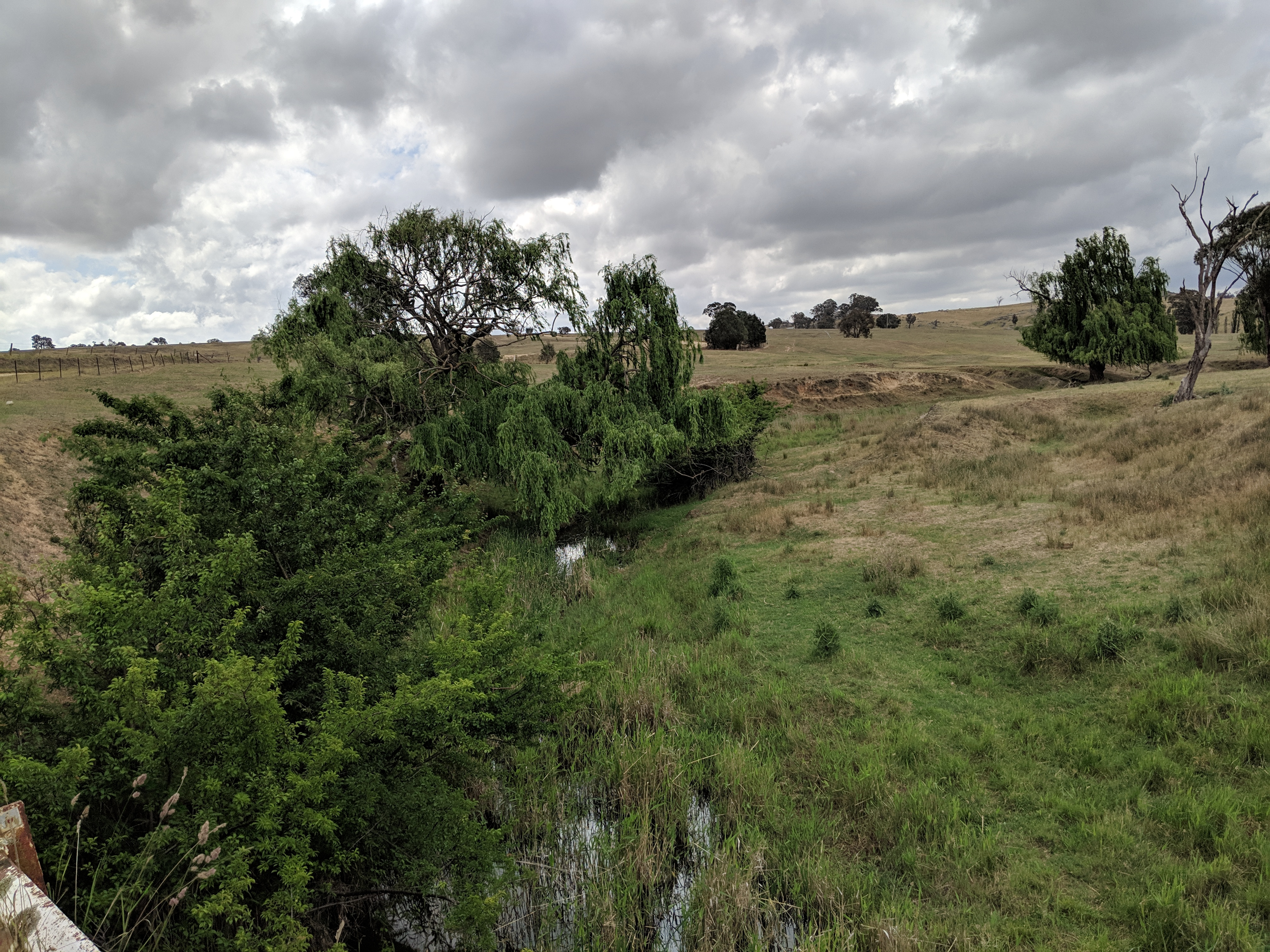
- Merrill Creek

- Coordinates: 34°40′57″S 149°15′46″E
- Country: Australia
- State: New South Wales
- Region: Southern Tablelands
- LGA: Upper Lachlan Shire
- Location: 80 km (50 mi) N of Canberra; 15 km (9.3 mi) N of Gunning; 60 km (37 mi) W of Goulburn; 257 km (160 mi) SW of Sydney; 54 km (34 mi) E of Yass

Government
  - State electorate: Goulburn
  - Federal division: Riverina
- Elevation: 583 m (1,913 ft)

Population
  - Total: 38 (SAL 2021)
- Postcode: 2581
- County: King
- Parish: Garway
Localities around Merrill
Bevendale	Biala	Gurrundah
Blakney Creek	Merrill	Gurrundah
Dalton	Gunning	Cullerin

Merrill is a locality in the Upper Lachlan Shire, New South Wales, Australia. It lies on Merrill Creek, to the west of the road from Gunning to Crookwell, about 15 km north of Gunning and 80 km north of Canberra. At the 2016 census, it had a population of 31.

Merrill Creek had a state school from 1877 to 1893. It was variously described as a "public", "provisional" or "half-time".
