= Gundaroo =

- Town
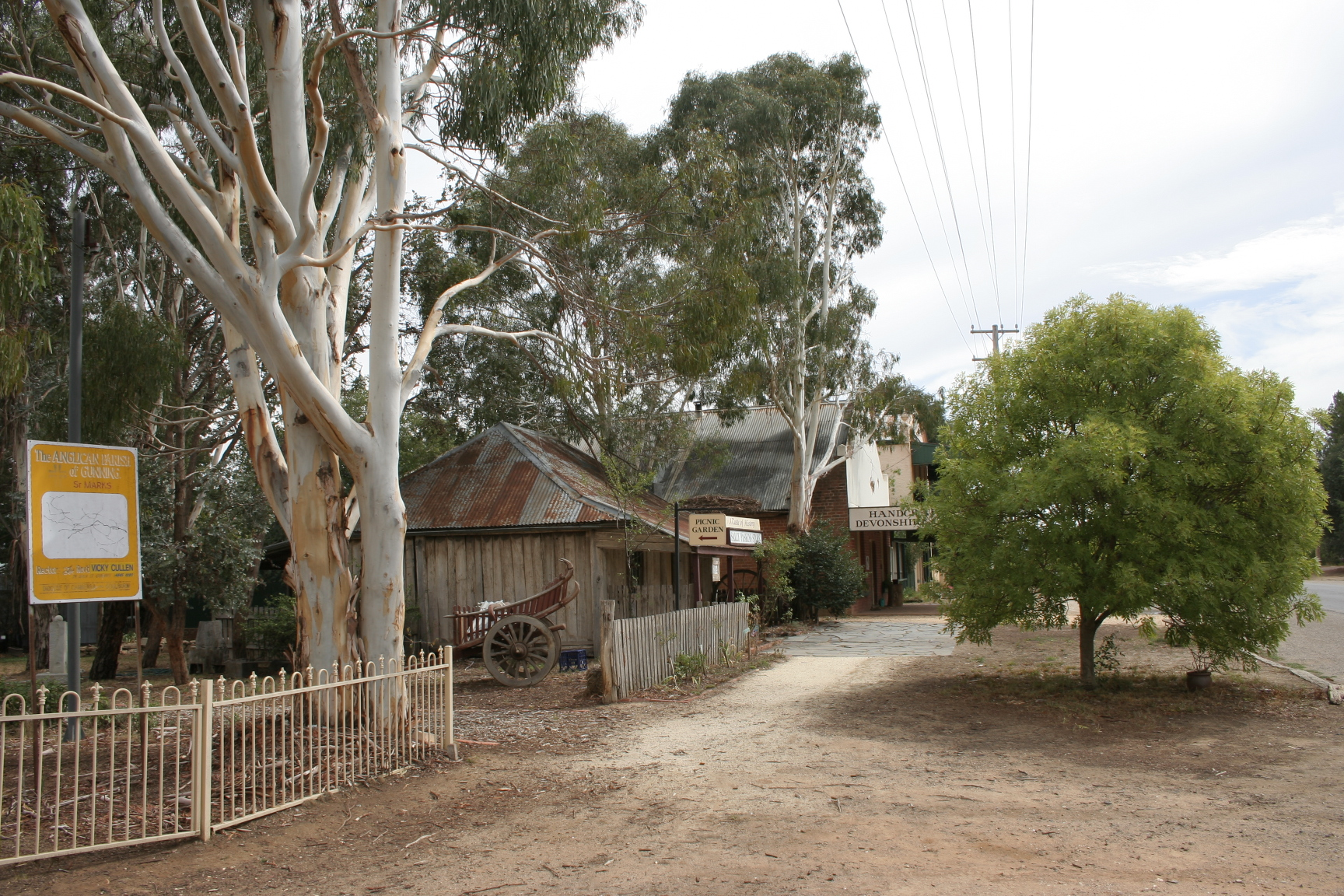
- Main street of Gundaroo

- Coordinates: 35°02′0″S 149°17′0″E
- Country: Australia
- State: New South Wales
- LGA: Yass Valley Council
- Location: 272 km (169 mi) SW of Sydney; 39 km (24 mi) N of Canberra; 29 km (18 mi) S of Gunning; 77 km (48 mi) SW of Goulburn
- Established: 1830s

Government
  - State electorate: Goulburn
  - Federal division: Riverina
- Elevation: 579 m (1,900 ft)

Population
  - Total: 1,233 (2021 census)
- Postcode: 2620
- County: Murray
- Parish: Gundaroo
Localities around Gundaroo
| Yass River | Bellmount Forest | Collector |
| Nanima | Gundaroo | Lake George |
| Springrange | Sutton | Bywong |

Gundaroo is a small village in the Southern Tablelands of New South Wales, Australia and in Yass Valley Council. It is situated to the east of the Yass River, about 16 kilometres (10 mi) north of Sutton, about 15 kilometres (9 mi) west of the Lake George range. At the 2021 census, Gundaroo "state suburb" (including surrounding areas) had a population of 1,233. At the 2006 census, its "urban centre/locality" had a population of 331.

== History ==
The area now known as Gundaroo lies close to the boundaries of the traditional lands of the Gandangara and Ngunawal peoples. The Gandangara and Ngunawal peoples spoke closely related, if not identical, languages.

The explorers Charles Throsby and Joseph Wild traveled through the Yass River valley in 1820. The Aboriginal people called the valley Candariro, meaning "blue crane". This name may have been the origin of Gundaroo, or it may mean "big waterhole". Governor Lachlan Macquarie granted the first white settler, Peter Cooney, 30 acres (12 ha) in 1825. Settlement proceeded fairly quickly and there were about 400 residents in the 1840s. The first non-residential building in Gundaroo was the Harrow Inn, built in 1834. The plan of the town made by James Larmer was gazetted in 1847. A post office was built in 1848 and an Anglican church, St Luke's in Upper Gundaroo (now part of a pottery business), in 1849. The first school opened in 1850 and a police station in 1852. A major impetus for the growth in the middle of the nineteenth century was the discovery of gold in the district in 1852. There was another short-lived phase of reef gold mining in the district in the 1890s.

Gundaroo was one of the sites considered for a capital city, within the 'Yass-Canberra' district. However, following a survey of the various sites, by Charles Scrivener, in 1909, Canberra was selected as the site for the new national capital city.

=== World War II air crash ===
On 7 December 1943, a RAAF Lockheed Ventura crashed three miles south-east of Gundaroo, killing all five crew members. A memorial to the victims was erected in the town.

== Gallery ==
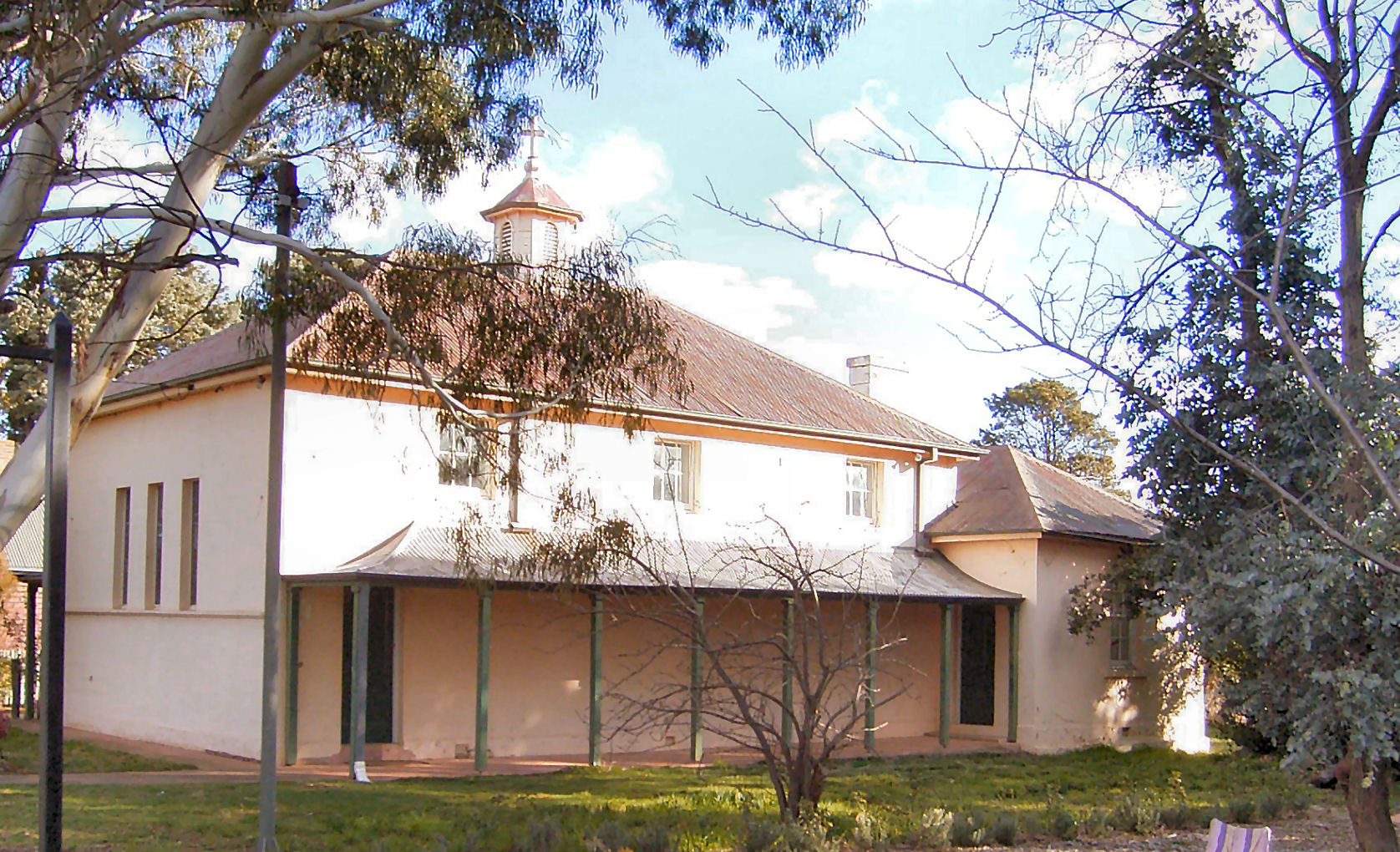
St Mark's Anglican Church in Cork St, formerly Gundaroo Court House, built in 1875

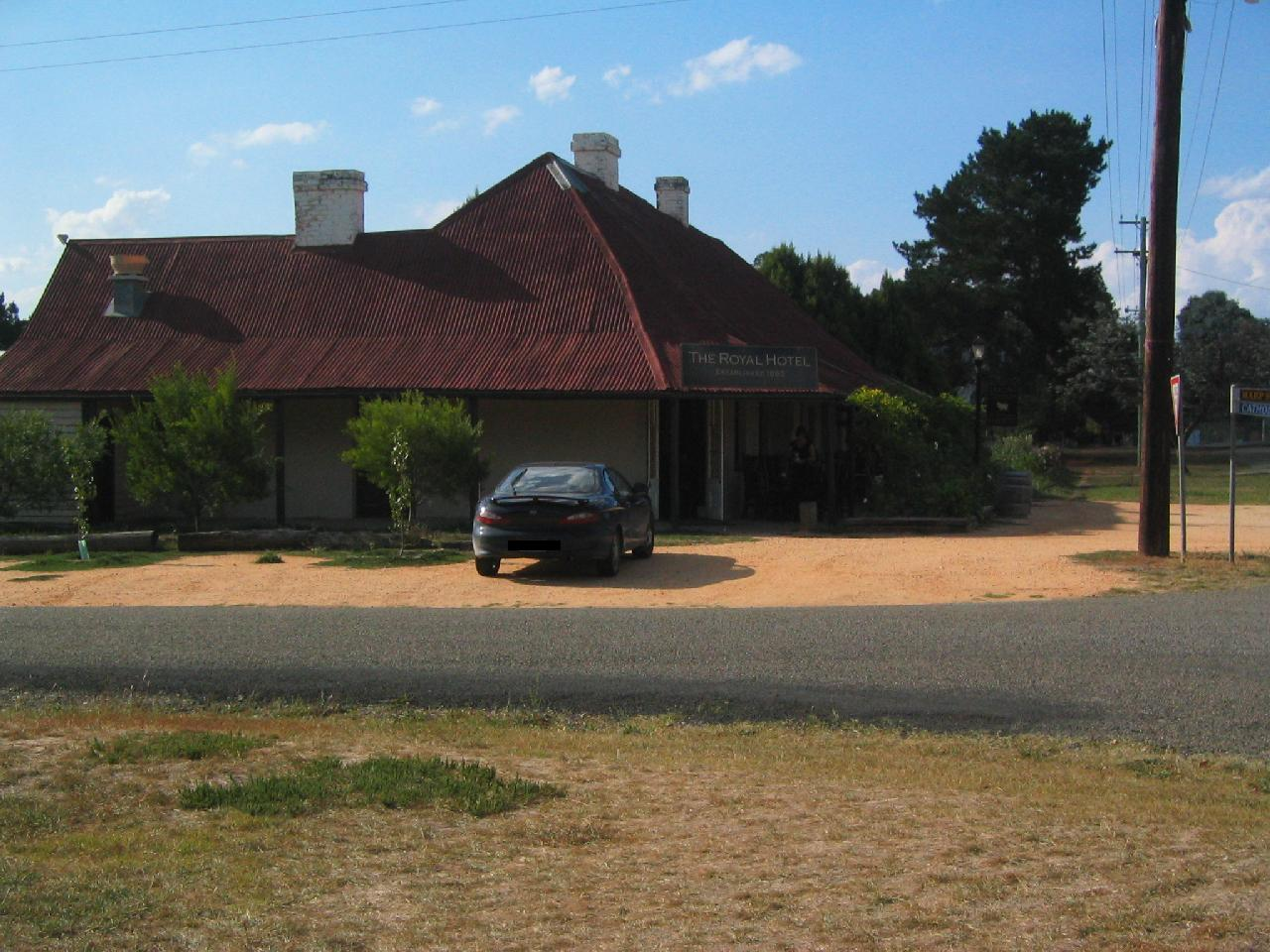
The Royal Hotel Gundaroo

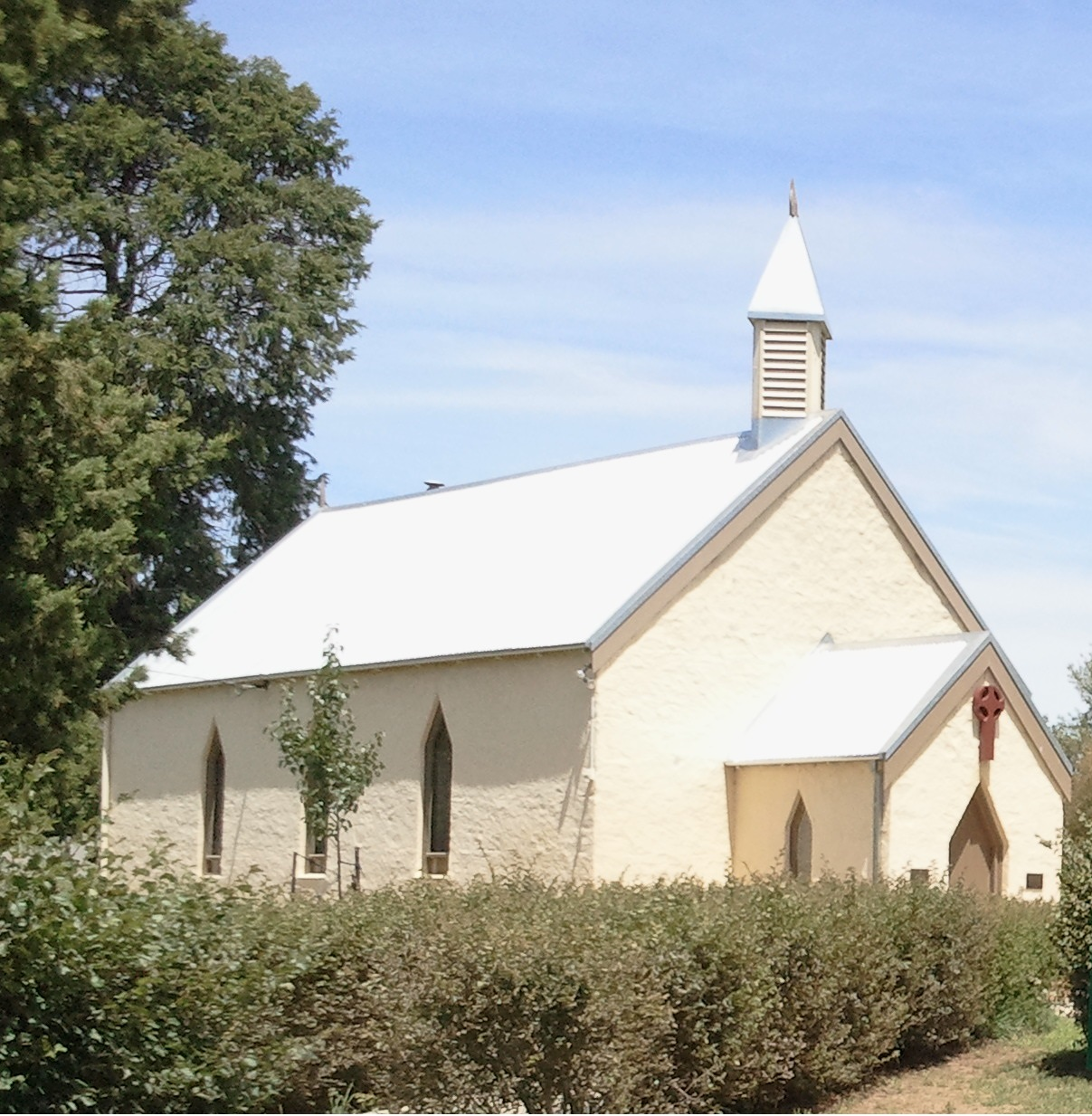
Gundaroo Community Church was originally the Presbyterian Church (1864). It is now under a Uniting Church.

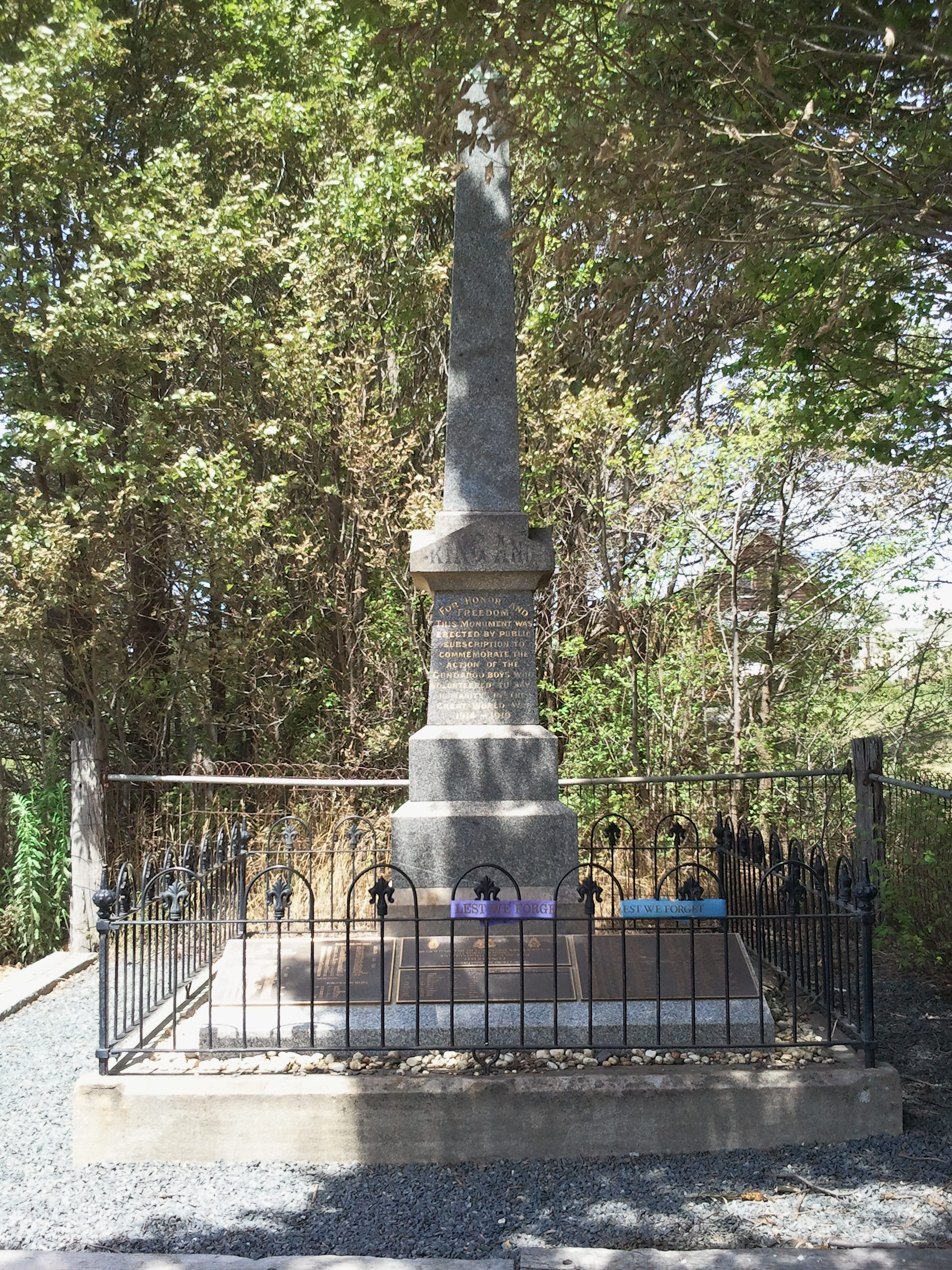
Gundaroo War Memorial

Gundaroo Catholic Pioneer Cemetery established in 1857

== Notable people ==
- Lawrie Willett, former senior Australian public servant and university Chancellor.
- William Affleck (1836–1923), a Scottish-born Australian politician.
- John Forrester-Clack, an Australian artist
- Jack Clemenger (1899–1964), an Australian tennis player
- Charles Elliott (1870-1938), an Australian politician
- Les Haylen (1898–1977), an Australian politician, playwright, novelist and journalist
- Maud Jeffries (1869–1946), an American actress
- Dick Smith (born 1944), an Australian entrepreneur, aviator, philanthropist and political activist
