= Federal Highway (Australia) =

Highway in New South Wales and the Australian Capital Territory

Federal Highway New South Wales–Australian Capital Territory
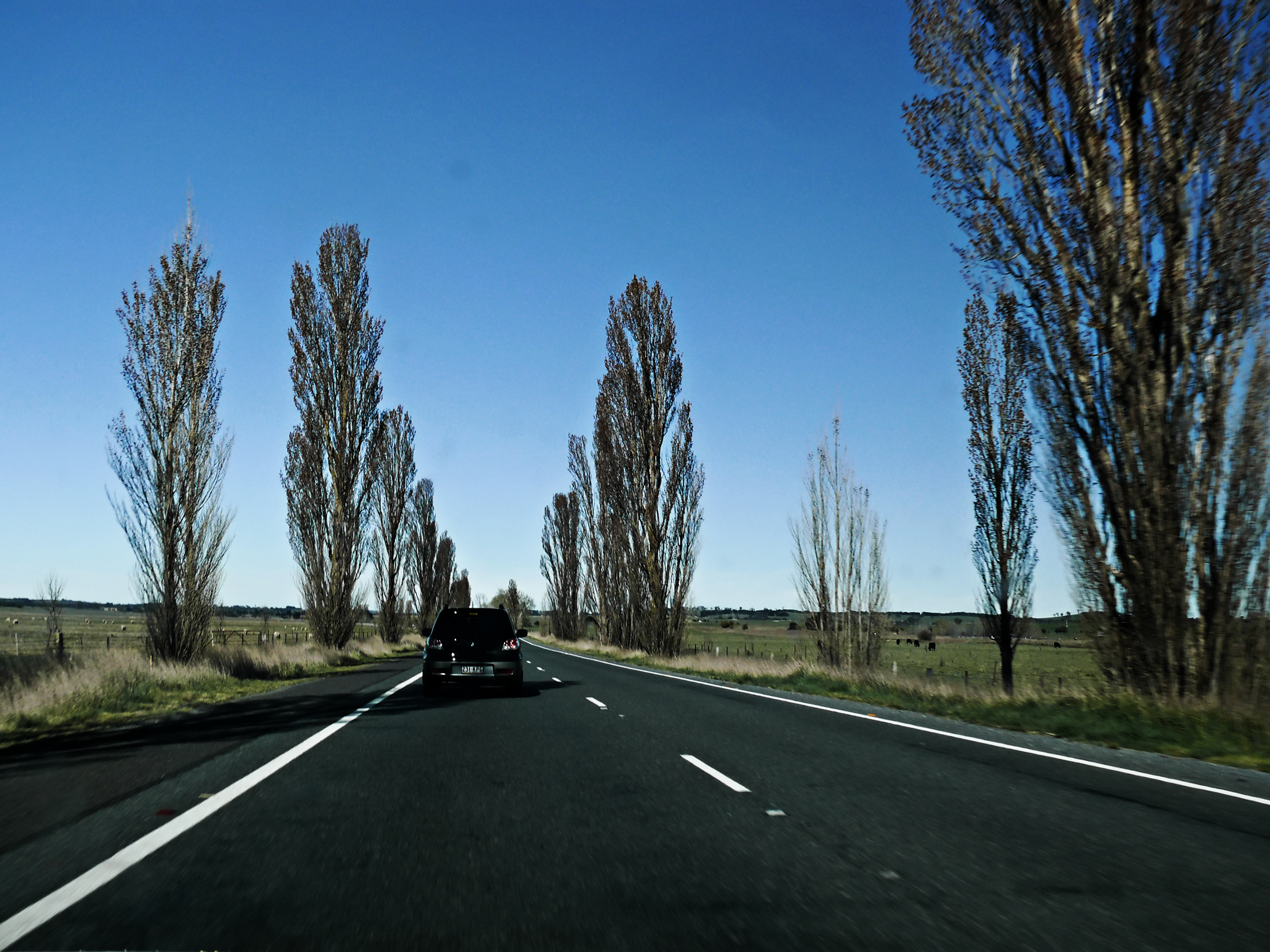
- Southbound carriageway, at Wollogorang. The median strip at this location is about 200 metres (656 ft) wide and contains pasture.
- Coordinates: 34.803013°S 149.609647°E (Northeast end); 35.240579°S 149.136991°E (Southwest end)

General information
- Type: Motorway
- Length: 72.7 km (45 mi)
- Opened: February 1931
- Gazetted: August 1928 (NSW, as Main Road 3)
- Maintained by: Transport for NSW (NSW); Territory and Municipal Services (ACT)
- Route number(s): M23 (2013–present) (Yarra–NSW/ACT border); M23 (2016–present) (ACT/NSW border–Majura); A23 (2013–present) (Majura–Lyneham)
- Former route number: A23 (2013–2016) (ACT/NSW border–Majura); National Highway 23 (1974–2013, within NSW); National Highway 23 (1974–2013, within ACT); National Route 23 (1955–1974)

Major junctions
- Northeast end: Hume Highway; Yarra, New South Wales
- Majura Parkway; Horse Park Drive; Barton Highway
- Southwest end: Northbourne Avenue; Lyneham, Australian Capital Territory

Location(s)
- Region: Southern Tablelands
- LGA(s): Goulburn Mulwaree Council, Upper Lachlan Shire, Queanbeyan-Palerang Regional Council, Yass Valley Shire, Australian Capital Territory
- Major suburbs / towns: Collector, Sutton, Watson, Downer, Lyneham

Highway system
- Highways in Australia; National Highway • Freeways in Australia; Highways in New South Wales; Road infrastructure in Canberra

Federal Highway is a highway in New South Wales and the Australian Capital Territory. It forms part of a motorway-standard link between Sydney and Canberra, and is also the main thoroughfare between those cities.

The north-eastern end of Federal Highway is located at its junction with Hume Highway near the rural city of Goulburn. It runs 72.7 km (45.2 mi) southwest to Canberra, the national capital of Australia, where its southwestern end is located at the intersection of Northbourne Avenue and Barton Highway. Federal Highway passes the villages of Wollogorang, Collector and Sutton, as well as skirting the western side of the endorheic basin containing Lake George.

== Route ==
Federal Highway is a motorway-standard roadway linking from the interchange with Hume Highway at Yarra, southeast of Goulburn, to Canberra in the Australian Capital Territory. The roadway has a continuous 110 km/h (68 mph) speed limit within New South Wales northbound. A southbound section between the Great Dividing Range, south of Yarra, and Rowes Lagoon, north of Collector, is on an old and winding alignment and has a speed limit of 100 km/h (62 mph), with many lower advisory speed signs. Within the Australian Capital Territory the posted speed limit is 100 km/h (62 mph) between the state border and Antill Street, 80 km/h (50 mph) between Antil Street and Flemington Road, and 70 km/h (43 mph) between Flemington Road and the end of the road at Barton Highway where the road runs parallel with the Canberra light rail route. The entire route is a dual carriageway with two lanes in each direction.

== History ==
In New South Wales, the passing of the Main Roads Act of 1924 through the Parliament of New South Wales provided for the declaration of Main Roads, roads partially funded by the State government through the Main Roads Board (MRB). The New South Wales section of Federal Highway was declared (as Main Road No. 3) on 8 August 1928, from its interchange with Hume Highway in Yarra, via Collector and Geary's Gap, to the interstate border; with the passing of the Main Roads (Amendment) Act of 1929 to provide for additional declarations of State Highways and Trunk Roads, this was amended to State Highway 3 on 8 April 1929. Construction had already been completed and traffic was already using the portion of the highway within New South Wales by December 1930.

In the Federal Capital Territory, the local Sydney-Canberra Road was officially declared part of Federal Highway in September 1928. Surveying and levelling had finished and work had started in April 1929 to connect to the New South Wales portion of the road, with the contract awarded to John Fowler (Aust) Ltd, to construct a 6-mile section of highway from Canberra (today Lyneham) to the interstate boundary. Approaching completion by February 1930, it was officially completed and opened on 25 February 1931.

The passing of the Roads Act of 1993 through the Parliament of New South Wales updated road classifications and the way they could be declared within New South Wales. Under this act, Federal Highway today retains its declaration as Highway 3, from Yarra to the interstate border with the ACT.

Federal Highway was allocated National Route 23 across its entire length in 1955. The Whitlam government introduced the federal National Roads Act 1974, where roads declared as a National Highway were still the responsibility of the states for road construction and maintenance, but were fully compensated by the Federal government for money spent on approved projects. As an important interstate link between the capitals of New South Wales and the Australian Capital Territory, Federal Highway was declared a National Highway in 1974 and was consequently re-allocated National Highway 23. With the conversion to the newer alphanumeric system in 2013, this was replaced with route M23 across the New South Wales' section, and route A23 across the Australian Capital Territory's section; an eastern portion was upgraded to route M23 when Majura Parkway opened in 2016.

The final section of dual carriageway was completed in 2000.

== Junction list ==
State	LGA / District	Location	km	mi	Destinations	Notes
New South Wales	Goulburn Mulwaree	Yarra	0.0	0.0	Hume Highway (M31) - Sydney, Goulburn, Albury, Melbourne	Partial Y-interchange, no southwestern entrance eastbound Northeastern terminus of highway and route M23
New South Wales	Goulburn Mulwaree	Yarra	2.9	1.8	Thornford Road – Currawang	Modified uncontrolled T-intersection (due to wide median strip at this location)
New South Wales	Goulburn Mulwaree	Wollogorang	8.8	5.5	Wollogorang Road – Breadalbane	Modified uncontrolled T-intersection (due to wide median strip at this location)
New South Wales	Upper Lachlan	Collector	21.6	13.4	Church Street – Collector	Uncontrolled T-intersection
New South Wales	Upper Lachlan	Collector	22.1	13.7	Collector Road - Currawang, Tarago	Uncontrolled T-intersection
New South Wales	Upper Lachlan	Collector	23.7	14.7	Collector Road – Collector, Gunning	Uncontrolled T-intersection
New South Wales	Queanbeyan–Palerang– Yass Valley boundary	Bywong	50.2	31.2	Shingle Hill Way - Gundaroo	Uncontrolled T-intersection
New South Wales	Queanbeyan–Palerang– Yass Valley boundary	Bywong	50.7	31.5	Bungendore Road - Bungendore	Uncontrolled T-intersection
New South Wales	Queanbeyan–Palerang– Yass Valley boundary	Sutton	58.3	36.2	Macs Reef Road - Bungendore	Uncontrolled T-intersection
New South Wales	Queanbeyan–Palerang– Yass Valley boundary	Sutton	59.2	36.8	Sutton Road - Gunning, Gundaroo, Sutton, Queanbeyan	Parclo A2 interchange
New South Wales	Queanbeyan–Palerang– Yass Valley boundary	Sutton			Mckeahnie Lane	Diamond interchange
State border			65.4	40.6	New South Wales – Australian Capital Territory state border	
Australian Capital Territory	Gungahlin–Majura boundary		67.2	41.8	Majura Parkway (M23 south) - Fyshwick, Canberra Airport; Horse Park Drive (north) – Gungahlin	Diamond interchange with single cloverleaf onramp Northeastern terminus of route A23, route M23 continues south along Majura Parkway
Australian Capital Territory	Gungahlin–Majura boundary	Watson	69.6	43.2	Antill Street – Watson, Hackett	Roundabout
Australian Capital Territory	Canberra Central	Watson–Lyneham boundary	71.6	44.5	Flemington Road – Lyneham, Exhibition Park in Canberra (EPIC)	Signal controlled T-intersection, light rail has signal priority
Australian Capital Territory	Canberra Central	Watson–Lyneham–Downer tripoint	71.9	44.7	Phillip Avenue – Downer, Hackett	Signal controlled crossroads, light rail has signal priority
Australian Capital Territory	Canberra Central	Lyneham–Downer boundary	72.7	45.2	Barton Highway (A25 northwest) – Hall, Yass; Northbourne Avenue (A23 south) – City, Queanbeyan, Cooma	Signal controlled T-intersection, light rail has signal priority. Southwestern terminus of highway, route A23 continues south along Northbourne Avenue
1.000 mi = 1.609 km; 1.000 km = 0.621 mi: Incomplete access; Route transition

== See also ==
- Highways in Australia
- List of highways in New South Wales
