= Breadalbane railway station =

Former railway station in New South Wales, Australia

Breadalbane
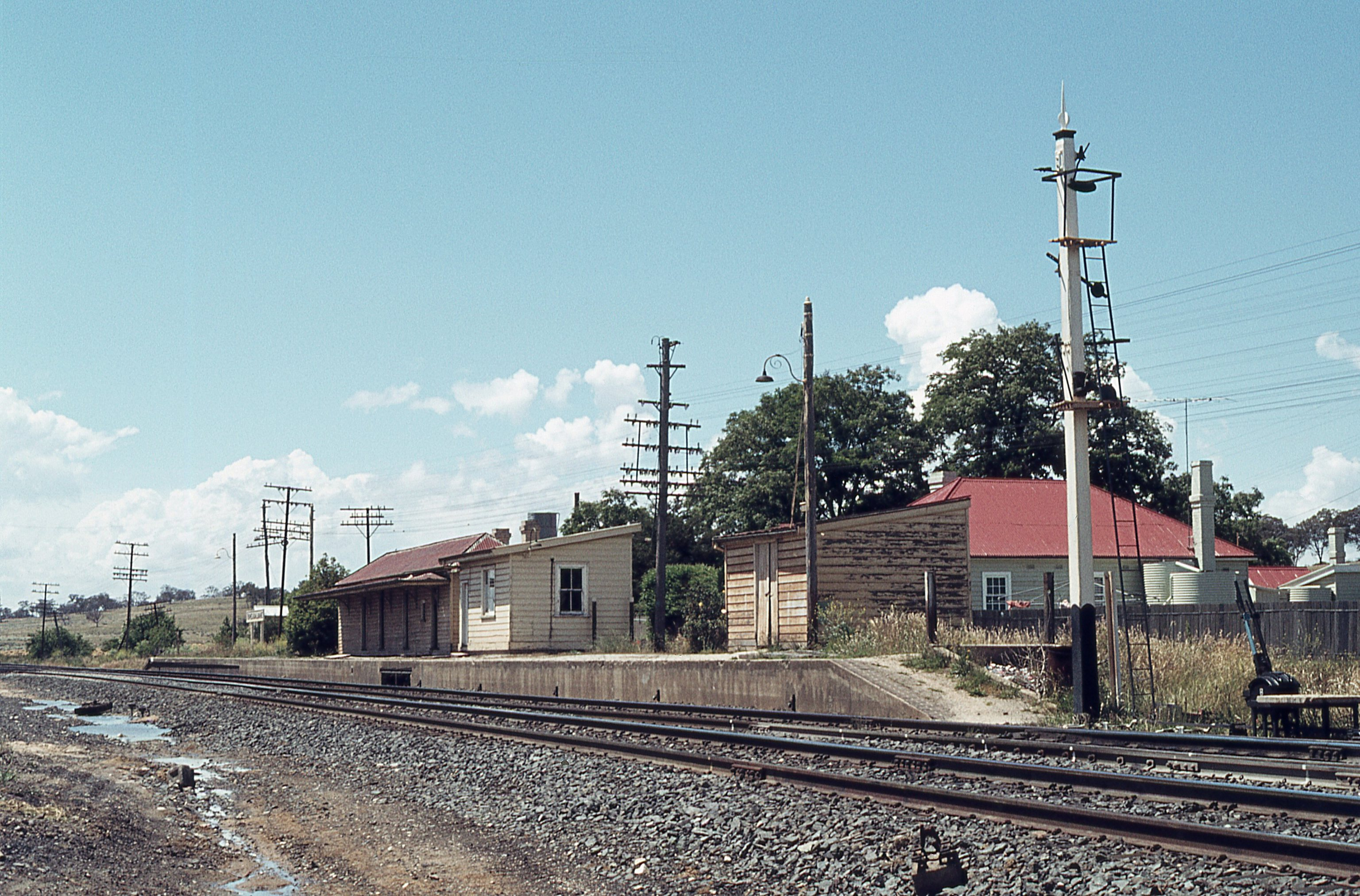
- Only one platform remained at the former station in 1980

General information
- Location: Cullerin & Breadalbane Roads, Breadalbane, New South Wales; Australia
- Coordinates: 34°47′24″S 149°29′29″E
- Operator: Public Transport Commission
- Line: Main Southern
- Distance: 247.900 from Central
- Platforms: 2 (2 side)
- Tracks: 2

Construction
- Structure type: Ground

Other information
- Status: Closed

History
- Opened: 5 November 1875
- Closed: 25 August 1974
- Former names: Bredalbane (1875-1876)

Services
Preceding station	Former services	Following station
Cullerin towards Albury	Main Southern Line	Yarra towards Sydney
Location

Breadalbane railway station was a railway station on the Main Southern railway line, serving the village of Breadalbane in New South Wales, Australia at Breadalbane, New South Wales. It opened on 5 November 1875 as Bredalbane, and was respelt on 4 April 1876 as Breadalbane. The station served passengers until 25 August 1974. It was later completely demolished and little trace of the station now survives.

== History ==
Not much remains of Breadalbane railway station. It's difficult to imagine the focus this station received if you were to visit Breadalbane today. But the station and its general location has a detailed past.

=== Early history ===
As early as 21 April 1870, the New South Wales Legislative Council discussed extending the railway from Goulburn to Breadalbane. Although, at this time, the discussion proposed using a 3 ft gauge (versus the standard 4’ 8.5” gauge) to reduce costs.

The possibility for a railway station at Breadalbane edged closer to reality when the Engineer-in-Chief, John Whitton delivered a report to the Engineer's Office in the Department of Public Works, Railway Branch on 24 April 1873. This report detailed the extension of the Great Southern line from Goulburn to Yass via three trial lines of which the first line passed over the Breadalbane Plains.

This first line was subsequently selected as the path for the extension as, “It seems to be admitted on all hands that the route between Goulburn and Yass now selected is the most practicable that can be discovered; and, indeed, it is a matter of surprise to persons acquainted with the district that a line so free from anything like engineering difficulties was to be found.”

With the official opening of the southern Railway Extension to Gunning on 2 November 1875, a platform was created at Breadalbane where “the old road is again crossed fifteen miles from Goulburn.” This platform was located 240 km (149 miles) from Sydney and at an elevation of 695 m (2281 ft).

Breadalbane first appeared in the railway timetable published 5 November 1875. The station received two Down services and 2 Up services with travel time to/from Sydney between 7 and 7.5 hours. By 9 August 1876, this frequency was temporarily reduced to a single Up (11:05pm) and Down (12:35am) service until being restored to the original two up/down services. The ticket price from Sydney to Breadalbane was 43s 4d for first-class and 32s 2d for second-class.

=== Possible branch lines ===
Soon after opening of the extension of the line to Yass, discussions began about branch lines from Breadalbane. Various options were being proposed for creating a branch to Queanbeyan and Cooma. The proposals included branches originating from Goulburn via Tarago, Gunning via Gundaroo and Gininderra, or Breadalbane via Collector and Bungendore.

In February 1878, “Contemporaries at Braidwood and Cooma have each uttered his dictum on the question of railway extensions towards Cooma.” This discussion focused on an extension from Breadalbane (versus Gunning) to include Queanbeyan and Gundaroo.

In October 1884, a proposal was brought to the Borough Council for a branch line to Crookwell commencing from Breadalbane. However, in that same meeting, it was noted that a station would need to be constructed at Breadalbane whereas a station already exists at Goulburn.

=== Facilities ===
Breadalbane has grown and shrunk with the demands of the time. At one point, in 1948, Breadalbane Station included the station building itself, a station masters residence, a Goods Shed, a Loading Bank, and Stockyards. These facilities were serviced by the up and down main line, a goods siding (south) an Up refuge siding (south) and a Down storage siding (north). Further south, an unused siding existed for the then dissolved Australian Iron and Smelting company.

Location

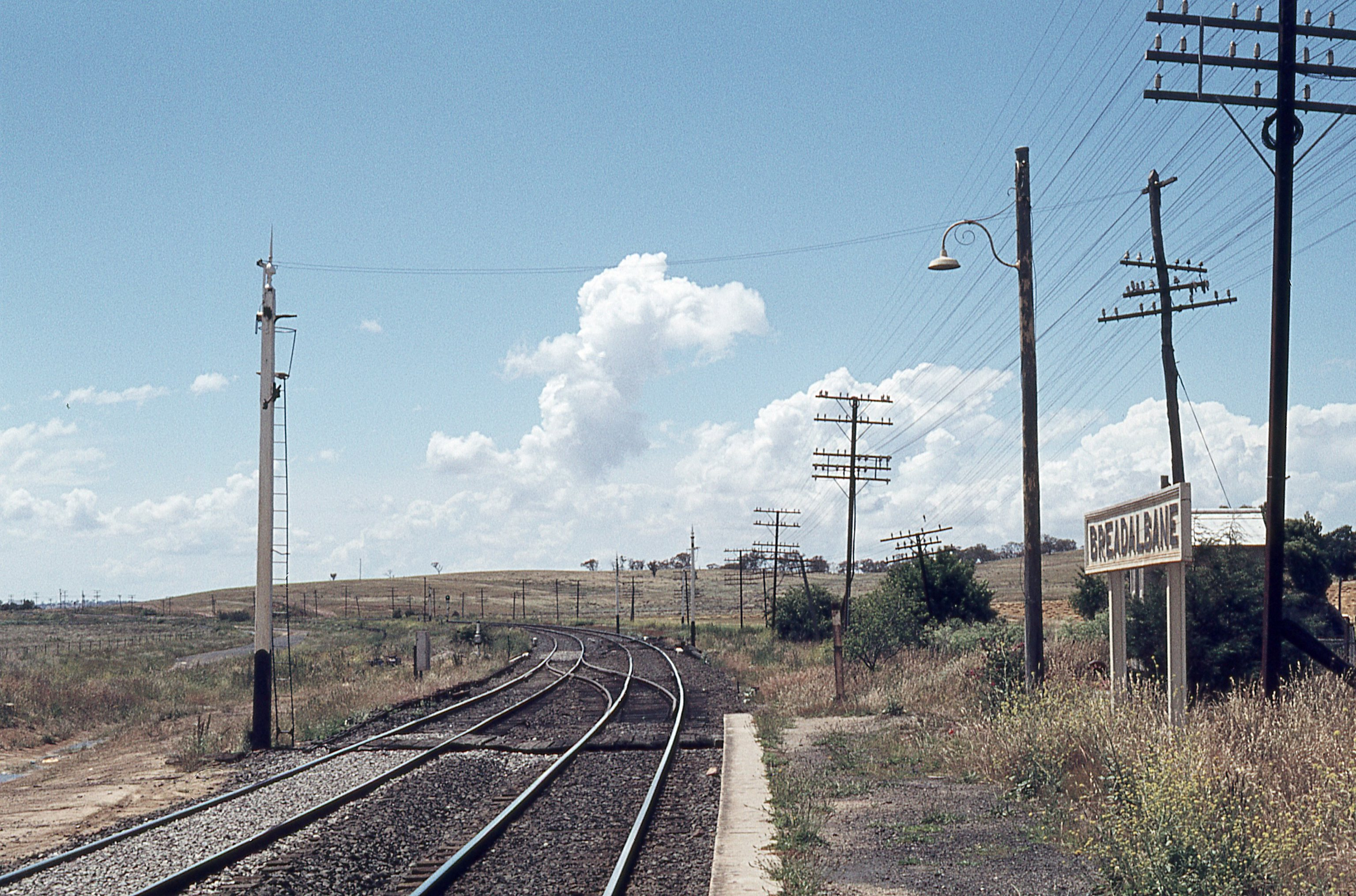
Breadalbane Railway Station 1979.

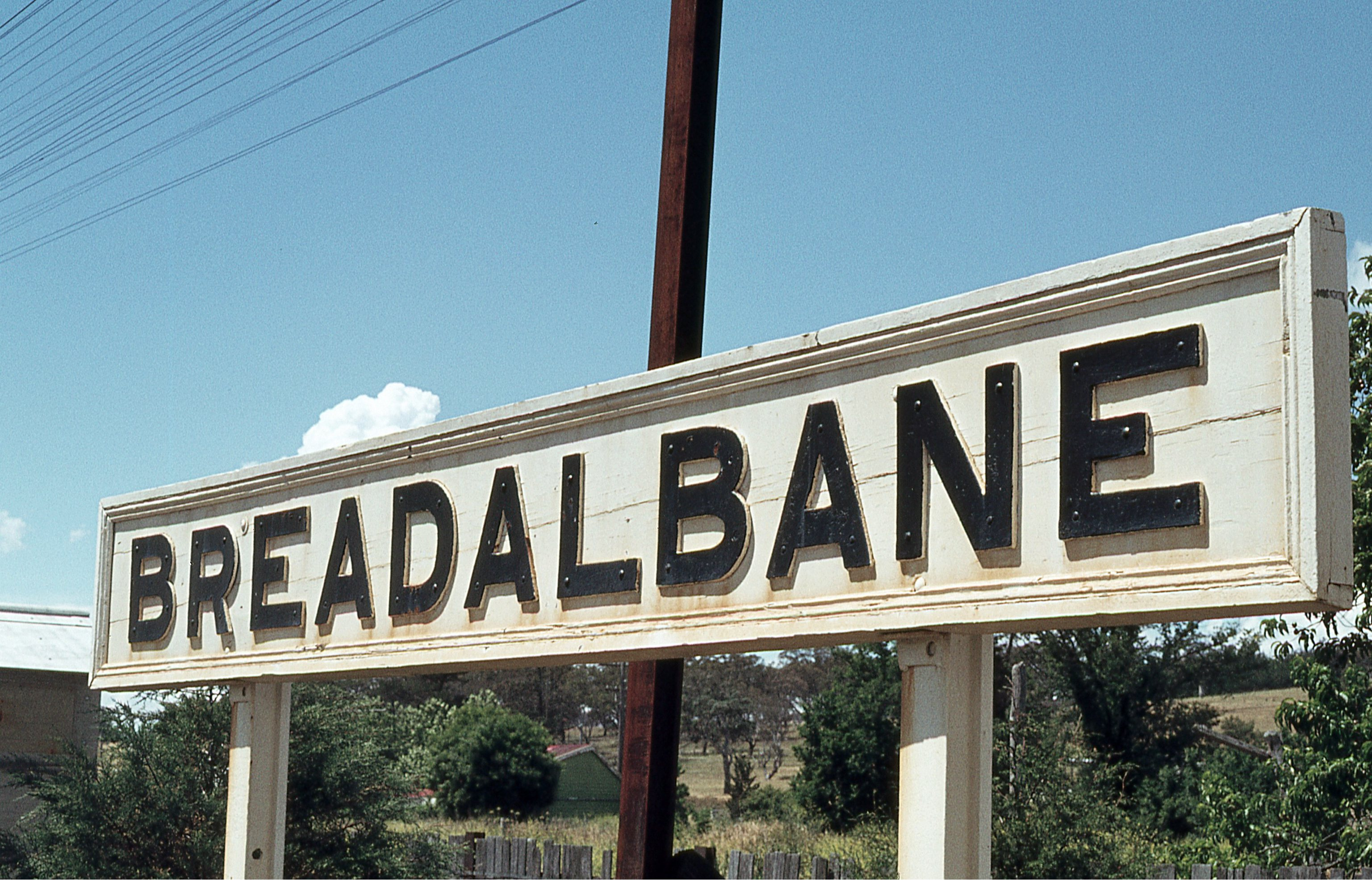
Breadalbane Railway Station sign 1979

=== Duplication ===
About 5 September 1911, Breadlbane was witness to, “a large number of men engaged on the duplication of the railway from Goulburn to Harden.” The work involved using pick and shovel and, “some splendid specimens of horseflesh, in the way of draughts, are to be seen among the fifty horses at work.”

=== Freight ===
Breadalbane was the centre of freight loading for much of the local region with peaks and troughs in the quantity of freight passing through with Wheat, Fruit such as cherries, cattle and sheep, wood, iron ore being in large quantities. Locals felt these continued quantities of freight necessitated the construction of a weighbridge and crane at the station. The issue of the construction of a weighbridge was revisited again in 1921, and 1922 without success.

On 26 October 1882, a local wrote of the insufficient staff at the station for assisting them in processing their freight. The locals notes that the station could benefit from additional staff during the good seasons. This was to be a recurring issue.

On 10 September 1947, the issue of the poor state of the trucking yards was raised at the meeting of the Goulburn Pastures Protection Board. It was stated that, “cattle had broken from the yards recently and had gone on to the road.” The Railway Department acknowledge that the while yards can be inconvenient at times, “it was considered that they were reasonable to meet requirements.”

=== Storms and Washaways ===
On the evening of 20 January 1886, “one of the most terrific storms of rain that has for many years been known in this district occurred.” The result of this rain was a shift in ballast of the railway line for about three miles very near the station.

More heavy rains on 24 January 1887 delayed the Down express train at Breadalbane station, “owing to word having been received that the bridge over the Fish River was unsafe”. The Commissioner for Railways placed on record the distinguished services of the Locomotive Inspector from Junee Junction for having adopted precautions avoiding, “possible disaster to the train running between Gunning and Breadalbane, from the flooded state to the road between those stations.”

On 19 February 1915, rains again delayed services at Breadalbane due a washaway having occurred. The trains were, “piloted across the damaged portion of the road, and not being able to make good the lost time steamed into Central Station from 30 to 60 minutes late.”

In the week prior to 18 February 1928, heavy rain caused flooding between Yarra and Breadalbane resulting in, “slight washaways in various places on the railway lines and traffic was held up for two hours.” Temporary repairs were made to the line with a passenger train from Goulburn being delayed for 2 hours.

On the afternoon of 30 January 1934, Breadalbane experienced the most severe storms on record. This resulted in floodwaters having, “swept across the main road and invaded railway property, covering the main line for a distance of between fifty and sixty yards.”. The result was a delay of the Harden passenger service being delayed for half an hour until the waters had subsided.

=== Accidents ===
Through good reporting and/or unfortunate luck, an extensive list of accidents can be compiled about Breadalbane Station and its locality.

A near-accident occurred on 6 December 1889, “through some mismanagement of the firing a mixed was unable to keep time, and came to a standstill." A Mail train followed a Goods train resulting in three trains in the same section at the same time. An inquiry into the incident found the guard was intoxicated and dismissed from the service while the driver and firemen were dismissed for mismanagement.

On 27 December 1891, a man died due to stepping out of a stationary train on the opposite side of the platform and fell backwards onto the rails. The night officer at the station heard someone groaning on the line and, “on going over he found a man lying with his head on one of the rails of the loop line.” The man subsequently died of his injuries shortly afterwards.

On 18 April 1903, a temporary fireman slipped from a tender as the train was departing Breadalbane resulting in his toes being crushed by the wheel of the tender. The man survived the incident.

On 27 November 1903, a driver slipped of the footplate of a slowly moving goods train falling between the platform and the train. His injuries were fatal since, “several wheels passed over his legs, cutting one off completely, and practically amputating the other.”

While not directly related to Breadalbane station, on 7 April 1904, a female passenger died on a mail train near Breadalbane due to a medical condition.

Extensive newspaper coverage resulted from a double fatality on 1 January 1911 where a tricycle, ridden on the line, was run over by a special goods train. The inquiry into the accident found no one was to blame.

On 20 January 1914, a man was found dead on the line two miles north of Breadalbane. The man had fallen from a limited express travelling south and was run over by a passing train travelling north. The prevailing theory was the man fell out a window as, “the side doors were locked, and it would not be possible for any one to get out through the end doors, which let into the carriages, without [the] witness seeing him.”

On 28 June 1916, a combined goods and livestock train became divided in the Cullerin-Breadalbane section of line with the detached rear portion of the train colliding with the front portion and derailing a number of stock trucks. No one was injured and it was surmised that, “the snapping of a coupling might have been responsible for the accident.”

On 30 August 1928, a goods train derailed near Breadalbane resulting in the traffic on the main south being, “dislocated for some hours.”

On 27 January 1940, a man escaped injury after having fallen from the Temora Mail as it sped through Breadalbane station. The man had given up his seat for two small children and fell asleep in the corridor. The man later awoke and subsequently fell from the train onto the permanent way. The man suffered lacerations, abrasions and shock but managed to walk to Breadalbane Station for medical attention.

Sometime in mid-December, a fireman on the Melbourne Express train was struck by falling bricks as the engine passed under an overhead bridge near Breadalbane.

On 29 December 1954, a 13-year-old boy was found on the railway line near Breadalbane. The police surmised that, “the boy, befuddled with sleep, left his compartment to go to the toilet, opened the carriage door by mistake and fell from the train.” The subsequent inquiry could not determine the reason for why, or how, the boy fell from the train.

=== Crime ===
While Breadalbane station wasn't a hotbed of crime, incidents have occurred in its past that were deemed worthy of reporting in local papers.

On 29 December 1891, the Day Officer in charge at the station was suspended for being absent without leave from duty.

On 28 December 1920, a man was charged with theft of Railway Commissioner proper valued at £5 and 2s.

On 6 December 1923, a man was fined for using bad language when describing the beauty of the roses on the station, “with an utter disregard for his choice of language.”

On 30 March 1933, three men were charged with trespass as they jumped onto a wheat train near Breadalbane. The Station Officer at Breadalbane, having spotted the men boarding the train, contacted Goulburn Railway Station where the men were subsequently arrested and fined £3.

Around 2 February 1939, tents of fettlers engaging in platelaying were ransacked by two youths. The youths appeared before the Children's Court, “and were committed to an institution.”

The fettler's tents proved to be a tempting target for locals as again, on 11 February 1939, the fettlers were targeted by men with various items having been stolen. These men were sentenced to 14 days of hard labor. (Crime #8)
