= Lake George (New South Wales) =

Endorheic lake in New South Wales

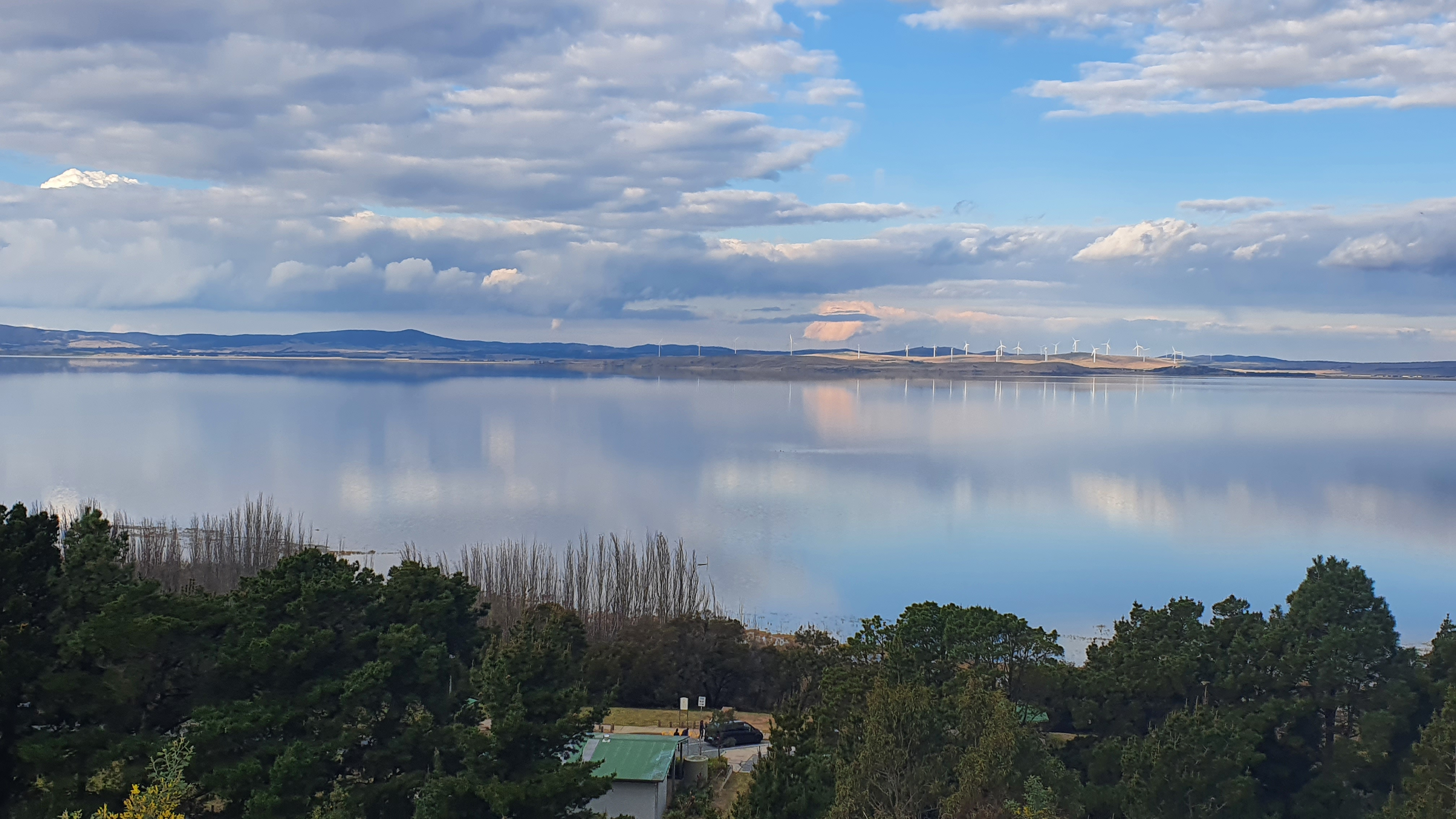
- Looking east across Lake George after prolonged rainfall in 2022

- Location within New South Wales
- Location: New South Wales
- Coordinates: 35°10′S 149°25′E
- Lake type: Intermittent
- Primary outflows: evaporation
- Basin countries: Australia
- Max. length: 25 km (16 mi)
- Max. width: 10 km (6.2 mi)
- Average depth: 1 metre (3 ft 3 in)
- Max. depth: 7.5 m (25 ft)
- Surface elevation: 654 m (2,146 ft)

Lake George (or Weereewa or Ngungara in the Ngunnawal language) is an endorheic lake in south-eastern New South Wales, Australia. It is approximately 40 kilometres (25 mi) north-east of Canberra located adjacent to the Federal Highway en route to Canberra and Sydney. Lake George is also the name of a locality on the western and southern edges of the lake, within the area of the Queanbeyan–Palerang Regional Council.

== Geography and hydrology ==
Lake George is an endorheic lake, as it has no outflow of water to rivers and oceans.

The lake is believed to be more than a million years old. Originally, small streams drained its catchment into the Yass River, but then the Lake George Escarpment rose due to major crust movement along a strong fault line, blocking this drainage and forming the lake. Lake George has in previous Ice Ages been much larger and deeper.

The thickness of sediment beneath the lake exceeds 250 metres (820 ft), according to a Bureau of Mineral Resources Canberra drilling programme in the 1982/83 summer. The oldest sediments, which lie some distance above the bedrock, were dated at 4–5 million years using spore and pollen analysis and magnetic-reversal stratigraphy.

At 25 km (16 mi) long and 10 km (6.2 mi) wide, Lake George is long, largely flat and extremely shallow, with a very small catchment. Resultant evaporation rates as well as a tendency for strong winds to blow the water back on itself explain the mysterious filling and drying episodes on both short term (hours) and long term (years) time scales that have been observed.

The lake's depth when full can range from 1.5–4.5 metres (4 ft 11 in – 14 ft 9 in); however in many areas it is only around 0.8–1.0 metre (2 ft 7 in – 3 ft 3 in) deep. Its deepest point has been measured as 7.5 metres (25 ft). When full, the lake holds about 500,000,000 cubic metres (1.8×10^{10} cu ft) of water. Between the late 1980s and mid-1990s, the lake lapped the Federal Highway on its western edge.

Lake George is one of the most studied lakes in Australia. The palaeontologist Patrick De Deckker has commented that "it is actually a depression that turns into a lake when it fills. There’s always water below the lake floor, and amazingly, it is saline, but if you have more rainfall, the lake fills up".

== Aquatic Life ==
The aquatic ferns Marsilea hirsuta and Azolla filiculoides grow in Lake George. Rushes and sedges growing at Lake George include the clustered rush (Juncus vaginatus), dwarf rush (Juncus capitatus), thread rush (Juncus filicaulis), jointed rush (Juncus articulatus), tall sedge (Carex appressa), acute sedge (Carex acuta) and Lhotsky's flat sedge (Cyperus lhotskyanus).

Wildlife recorded from Lake George includes the mountain galaxias (Galaxias olidus), the red percher dragonfly (Diplacodes bipunctata), snake necked turtle (Chelodina longicollis), pelican (Pelecanus conspicillatus), yabby (Cherax destructor), water rat (Hydromys chrysogaster), a water snail (Bullastra lessoni), freshwater mussel (Alathyria profuga) and the spotted marsh frog (Limnodynastes tasmaniensis). The Murray cod and golden perch have been introduced when lake levels are high.

== Activities ==
Lake George is the site of an experimental scientific wave behaviour platform established by researchers from the Civil Engineering department of the Australian Defence Force Academy in Canberra.

Since the 1960s hang gliders have been flown from the escarpment when easterly winds form standing waves. Pilots can then fly along the length of the lake. Unpowered model aircraft are also flown from this area, and powered models are flown from the lake floor.

Wine grapes are grown along the western edge of the lake, on the escarpment. Sheep are grazed on the lake when it is dry or nearly so.

=== Public art ===
Lake George was an important subject for the Canberra artist, Rosalie Gascoigne (1917–1999) who told Kate Davidson in 1996 that she "was enraptured with the feeling of getting out of my car at the top of the range above Lake George and Gundaroo and seeing Australia stretch away under a big dome of sky. Nothing is there, but everything is there. It was very free and uncalculated. You cannot really express it in concrete terms, you have to be elusive and allusive at the same time." (Davidson, Kate and Michael Desmond, Islands: Contemporary installations from Australia, Asia, Europe and America, National Gallery of Australia, Canberra, 1996). Works inspired by Lake George include Pale landscape 1977 (Museum of New Zealand Te Papa Tongarewa, Wellington), Feathered fence 1978-79 and Suddenly the lake 1994–95 (both National Gallery of Australia), But mostly air 1994–95 (Art Gallery of South Australia) and Lake 1991 (Garangula Gallery NSW). Pale landscape 1977 and Feathered fence 1978-79 were both made with thousands of swans feathers found at a sanctuary at the southern end of the lake in the mid-1970s, the swans are no longer there since the lake dried up.

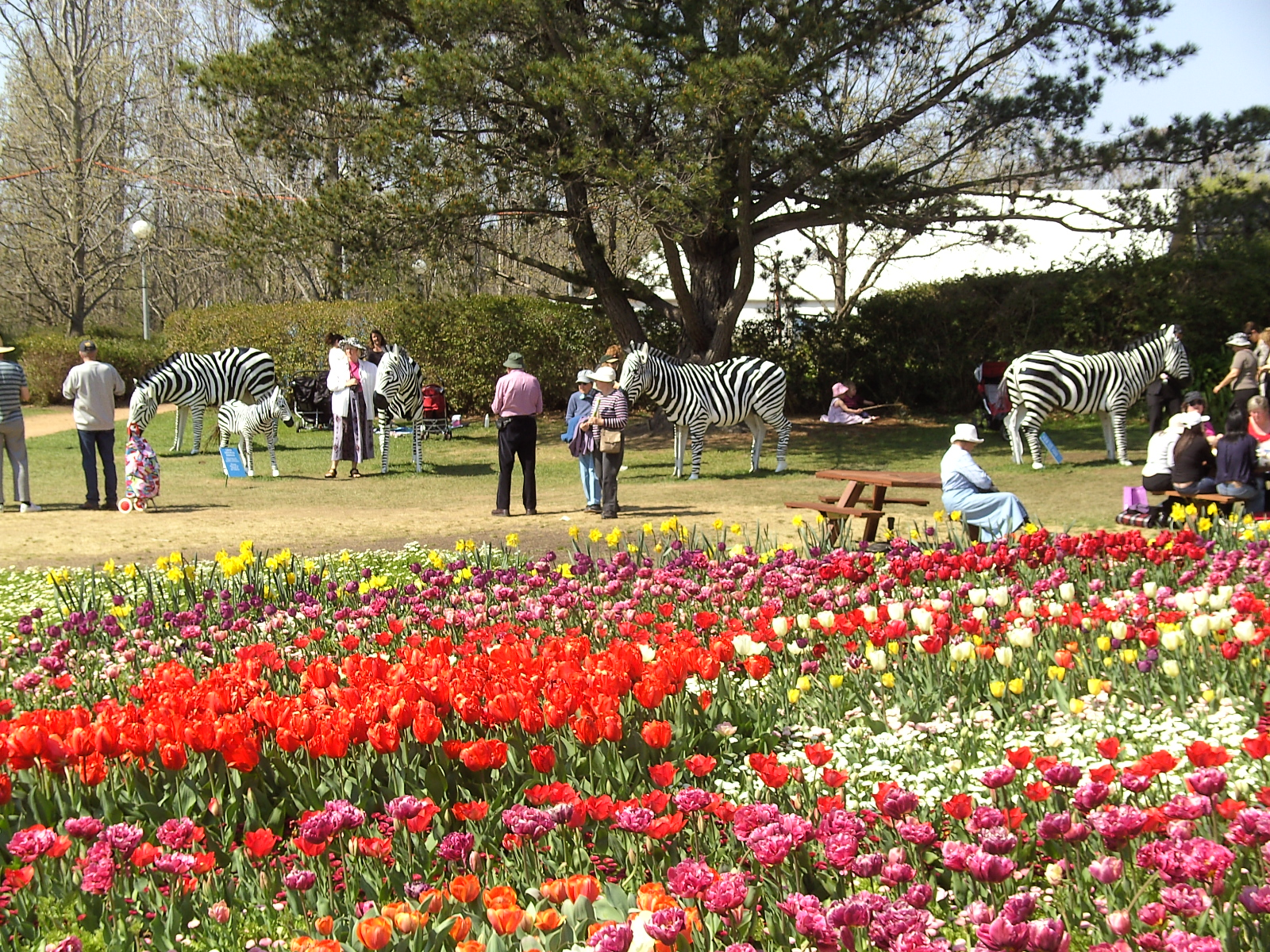
Zebra herd at the Floriade event

In 2010, Canberra artists Alan and Julie Aston installed a herd of zebra sculptures on the lake adjacent to the highway stop commemorating Kevin "Dasher" Wheatley VC, used as a "Driver Reviver" site. They were named Stopper, Reviver, Survivor, and Dasher. They were a sensation, but the Government of New South Wales ordered that they be removed, following a complaint from the leaseholder of the land. They reappeared at Floriade in September 2010, along with a baby, George.

=== Folklore ===
The lake is the setting for several stories of haunting and UFO sightings, and has been the setting for a ghost tour run by Tim the Yowie Man.

== History ==
The foreshore of what is now known as Lake George mainly lies within the traditional lands of the Gundungarra, but its south-western foreshore is at the extreme east of the traditional lands of the Ngunnawal people. These two peoples spoke a very similar, if not identical, language. The traditional lands of the Ngarigo people probably also extend to the lake's southern shoreline, in the area now known as Bungendore. The lake lies not far from the traditional lands of the Walbanga people (a group of the Yuin from the upper Shoalhaven catchment), to the east. Backed artefact manufacturing workshops have been identified at the lake, dating back to the late Holocene. Based on the recurring shapes of the stone artefacts, these workshops have been interpreted as a place where broken composite tools were being rehafted.

The local indigenous people called the lake Werriwa (originally spelled Weereewa in the journals of the explorers who noted the name), which may mean "bad water"; even when full, the lake is one of the saltiest bodies of water in inland NSW, almost as saline as seawater. However, the name is also similar to regional indigenous word for eagle, which often fly there. One of the original 75 electoral divisions of the Australian House of Representatives in 1901 was named "Werriwa", the original Aboriginal name of the lake. By 1913, it no longer included the lake, and the electorate is currently centred in the south-western suburbs of Sydney.

The first European to visit the lake was Joseph Wild on 19 August 1820, and it was named for King George III on 28 October 1820 by Governor Lachlan Macquarie, who was touring the area as part of a Royal Commission inquiring into the condition of the Colony. Land grants on the northern shoreline of the lake had been made to colonial settlers as early as 1824.

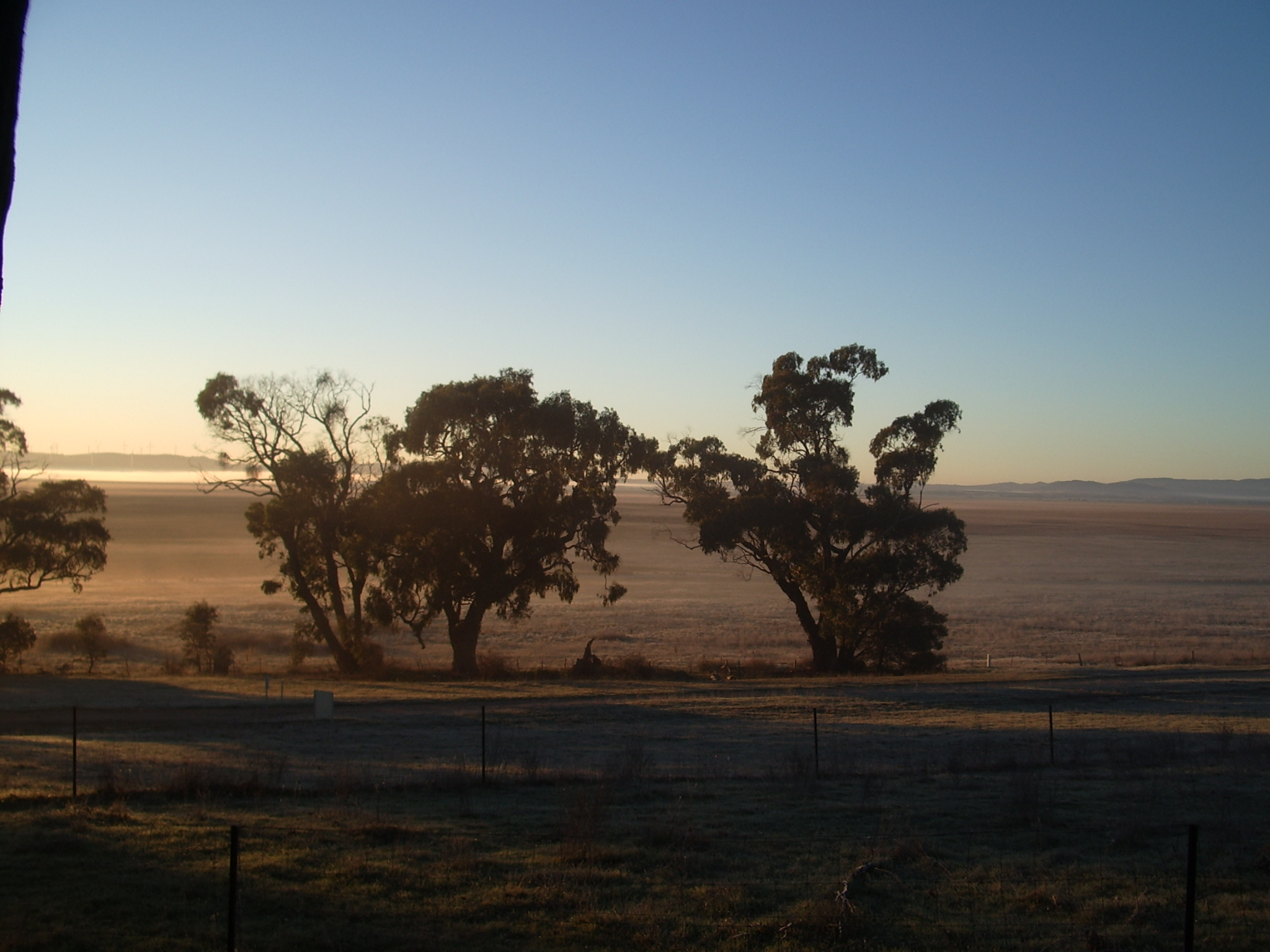
Looking east over a dry lake bed

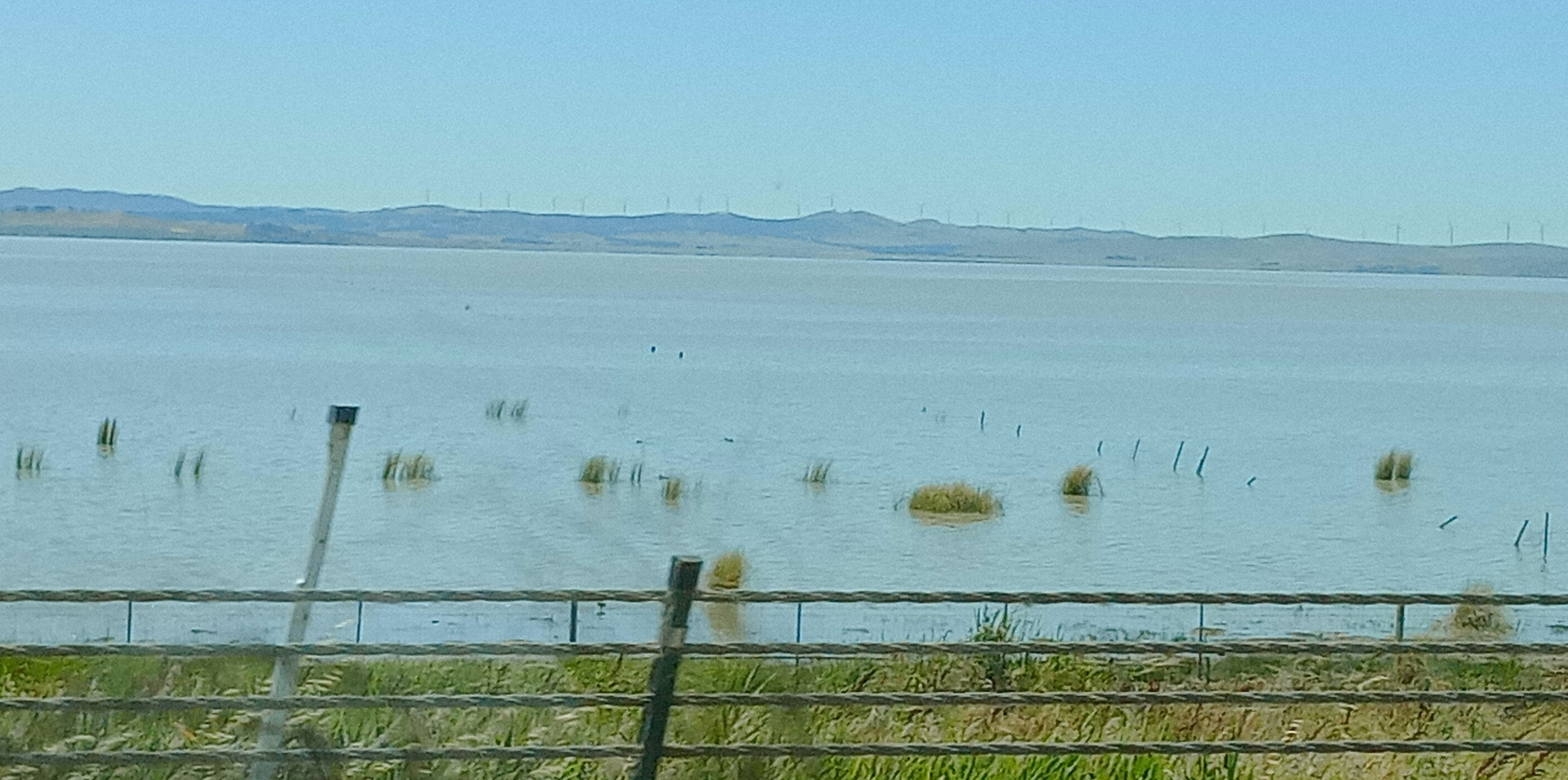
Part of Lake George in 2024 after it was filled by several days of prolonged rain

A separate body of water—Murray's Lagoon—once existed close to the northern end of the lake, adjoining the property, Ajamatong, owned by Terence Aubrey Murray. In the mid-1830s Murray used convict labour to build a 50 m long, stone-lined canal, excavated to up to 4m into the ground, with the aim of connecting the two bodies of water. Unfortunately, the level of the lagoon was slightly higher than the lake, and the canal was a failure. The canal still exists and passes under The Vineyards Road (the old Federal Highway), on private property, continuing as a drainage culvert under the modern-day Federal Highway.

In the 1850s, Murray's Lagoon was stocked with Murray cod fished out of the Molonglo River at Murray's other property, Yarralumla. At some time, Murray's Lagoon overflowed and introduced a translocated population of Murray cod into the lake itself. They bred rapidly and, from the 1850s to the 1890s; Lake George abounded with them. The long Federation Drought commenced in the mid-1890s, and by 1902 the lake had dried out completely. In their search for water to survive in, the Murray cod flocked into the mouths of the few small creeks feeding the lake and died there by the thousands.

Immediately north of the lake, at Currawang, copper ore was mined and smelted at various times, from 1865 to around 1908. For many years, the old mine workings and waste heaps remained exposed and contaminated runoff water was entering Lake George, via a creek that ran through the mining area. After a new lead-silver-zinc ore deposit was identified nearby, in 1973, part of the new work undertaken, from 1987 onward, was to rehabilitate the 19th-century mine workings and stop the contamination of the lake. All mining at Currawang has now ceased.

In 1886, a site was reserved for a village to be known as Murray, on the northern shoreline of the lake, just west of the landform known as Kenny's Point. Although the village was surveyed and allotments put up for sale in 1887 and 1910, the village seems not to have developed. Its design was cancelled in 1919. It was located just beyond the end of modern-day Lake George Road. To this day there is no town or village on the lake's shoreline.

In the early 1900s, an area immediately to the south-east of the lake and north-north-east of Bungendore, was surveyed as a possible site for the capital city of Australia. The city would have extended from close to the Lake George shoreline to the Bombala railway line. Although it had the advantage of an existing railway connection, the site presented difficulties, particularly in supplying it with sufficient fresh water and the variability of the water level in Lake George. Instead, the Australian Capital Territory and city of Canberra were established some 30 km (19 mi) south-west of the lake.

The selection of Canberra as the national capital brought pressure for a more direct route by road from Sydney, resulting in the construction of the Federal Highway, which opened in December 1930; part of its route follows the western shore of the lake.

During World War II, a wooden 'dummy' ship was floated on the lake and used for bombing practice by the Royal Australian Air Force. It is possible that there is still unexploded ordnance settled into the lake bed.

On 8 July 1956 five cadets from the Royal Military College, Duntroon died due to hypothermia in a yachting accident.

Due to the drought in New South Wales, Lake George dried out completely in November 2002, and remained so until February 2010 when it started to refill. The previous time the lake had dried out completely was during a severe drought in the 1940s, although it was partially dry in 1986, leaving large pools of water. When the lake is empty it is used by farmers to graze sheep and cattle. During September 2016, the lake filled for the first time since 1996. In the intervening years the level of water in the lake had never been as high as that in September 2016.

Rain during August 2020 helped to partly fill the lake again after several more years of drought. In December 2021, the Lake was full once again.

The unusual fluctuations in the water level have given rise to fanciful urban myths that the lake is somehow connected to lakes in Peru or South Africa, although NSW government ecologist Justin Nancarrow theorises that the lake may indeed be connected to the nearby Yass River by subterranean aquifers which pass under the surrounding escarpment, and that this connection may explain the salinity of the river.

== Wind-power generation ==
The 140-megawatt (190,000 hp) Capital Wind Farm completed in 2009 is located along the south-eastern side of Lake George.

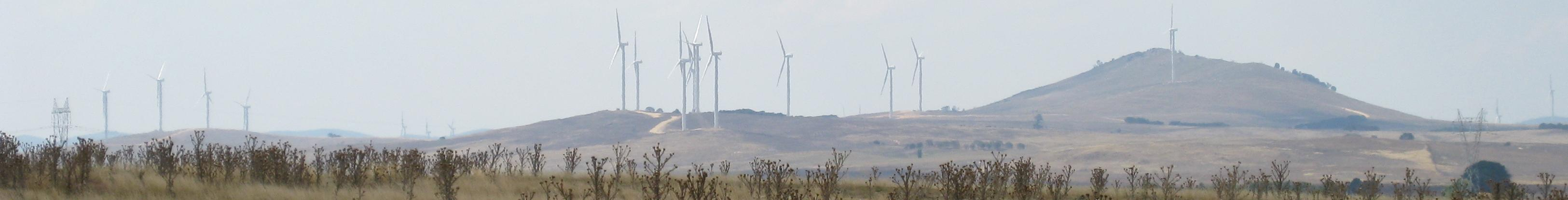
Capital Wind Farm on the south eastern side of Lake George

== Locality ==
Lake George
- Town
- Coordinates: 35°06′19″S 149°22′17″E
- Country: Australia
- State: New South Wales
- Region: Southern Tablelands
- LGA: Queanbeyan–Palerang Regional Council
- Location: 34 km (21 mi) NE of Canberra; 59 km (37 mi) SW of Goulburn

Government
  - State electorate: Monaro
  - Federal division: Eden-Monaro

Population
  - Total: 118 (2021 census)
- Postcode: 2581
- County: Murray
- Parish: Lake George
Localities around Lake George
Lerida	Collector	Currawang
Gundaroo	Lake George	Tarago
Bywong	Bungendore	Mount Fairy

Lake George is a locality covering territory on the western and southern edges of the lake, stretching east to the Bombala railway line. The locality is largely within the area of the Queanbeyan–Palerang Regional Council, although some hillside areas are in the Yass Valley Council. At the 2021 census, it had a population of 118. The locality is generally rural-residential in character along the lake shore. A former grazier's homestead at Silver Wattle Point now operates as a religious retreat and Quaker meeting house. Located in the eastern section of the locality close to the town of Bungendore are some industrial facilities, including a sand quarry and an electrical substation serving the Capital Wind Farm. There is a winery near the lake, in the same town, called Lake George Winery. The winery is 849 m above sea level, and it has homesteads and cottages.
