= Fish River railway station =

Former railway station in New South Wales, Australia

Fish River

General information
- Location: Cullerin Road, Cullerin, New South Wales; Australia
- Coordinates: 34.7831°S 149.3096°E
- Operator: Public Transport Commission
- Line: Main Southern
- Distance: 271.021 km from Central
- Platforms: 2 (2 side)
- Tracks: 2

Construction
- Structure type: Ground

Other information
- Status: Demolished

History
- Opened: 9 November 1875
- Closed: 9 March 1975

Services
Preceding station	Former services	Following station
Gunning towards Albury	Main Southern Line	Cullerin towards Sydney
Location

Fish River railway station was a railway station on the Main South railway line in New South Wales, Australia. It opened in 1875 as part of the extension of the Great Southern line from Goulburn to Gunning and closed to passenger services in 1975. The signal box survived for a time after the platform was demolished, little trace of the station now survives.

== Timetable and fares ==
In 1884, Fish River was classified as a siding requiring passengers to notify the guard of their intent to disembark at the previous station (Goulburn or Gunning). The journey time from Sydney was approximately 6.5 hours with the cost of a Single first-class fare being 28 shillings and 3 pence.

== Accidents at Fish River ==
Fish River was the scene of a fatal accident on 27 October 1888. It is alleged that the signal was not appropriately resulting in a collision with another train.

On 22 February 1914, Fish River was the scene of two non-fatal accidents occurring on the same day where, in one accident, an engine was slightly damaged and, in a second accident, a wagon was derailed.
