= Cullerin railway station =

Former railway station in New South Wales, Australia

Cullerin
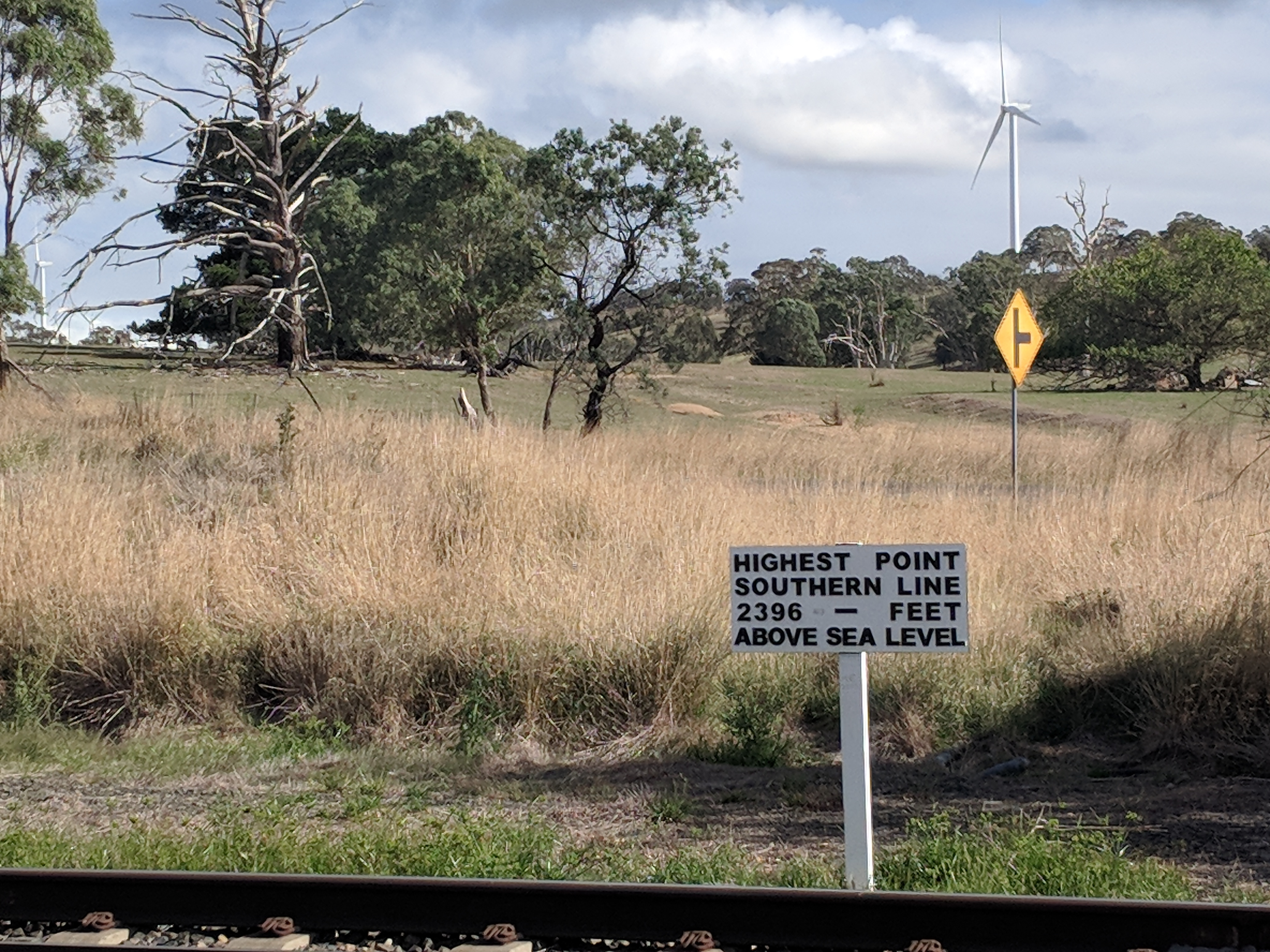
- Sign at the site of the former station in 2018

General information
- Location: Cullerin Road, Cullerin, New South Wales; Australia
- Coordinates: 34.7831°S 149.4064°E
- Operator: Public Transport Commission
- Line: Main Southern
- Distance: 256.300 km from Central
- Platforms: 2 (2 side)
- Tracks: 2

Construction
- Structure type: Ground

Other information
- Status: Demolished

History
- Opened: 1 September 1880
- Closed: 25 March 1973

Services
Preceding station	Former services	Following station
Fish River towards Albury	Main Southern Line	Breadalbane towards Sydney
Location

Cullerin railway station was a railway station on the Main South railway line in Cullerin, New South Wales, Australia. It opened on 1 September 1875, and was located near the top of the Cullerin Range. The platforms at Cullerin were 44 metres, around half the length of its neighbour, Breadalbane railway station. The station site was also the highest point of the Main Southern line between Sydney and Melbourne. Cullerin closed to passenger services on 25 March 1973. It was later completely demolished and no trace of the station now survives. Legal names of the area were no longer recorded as of 1976.
