= Breadalbane, New South Wales =

Breadalbane
- Town
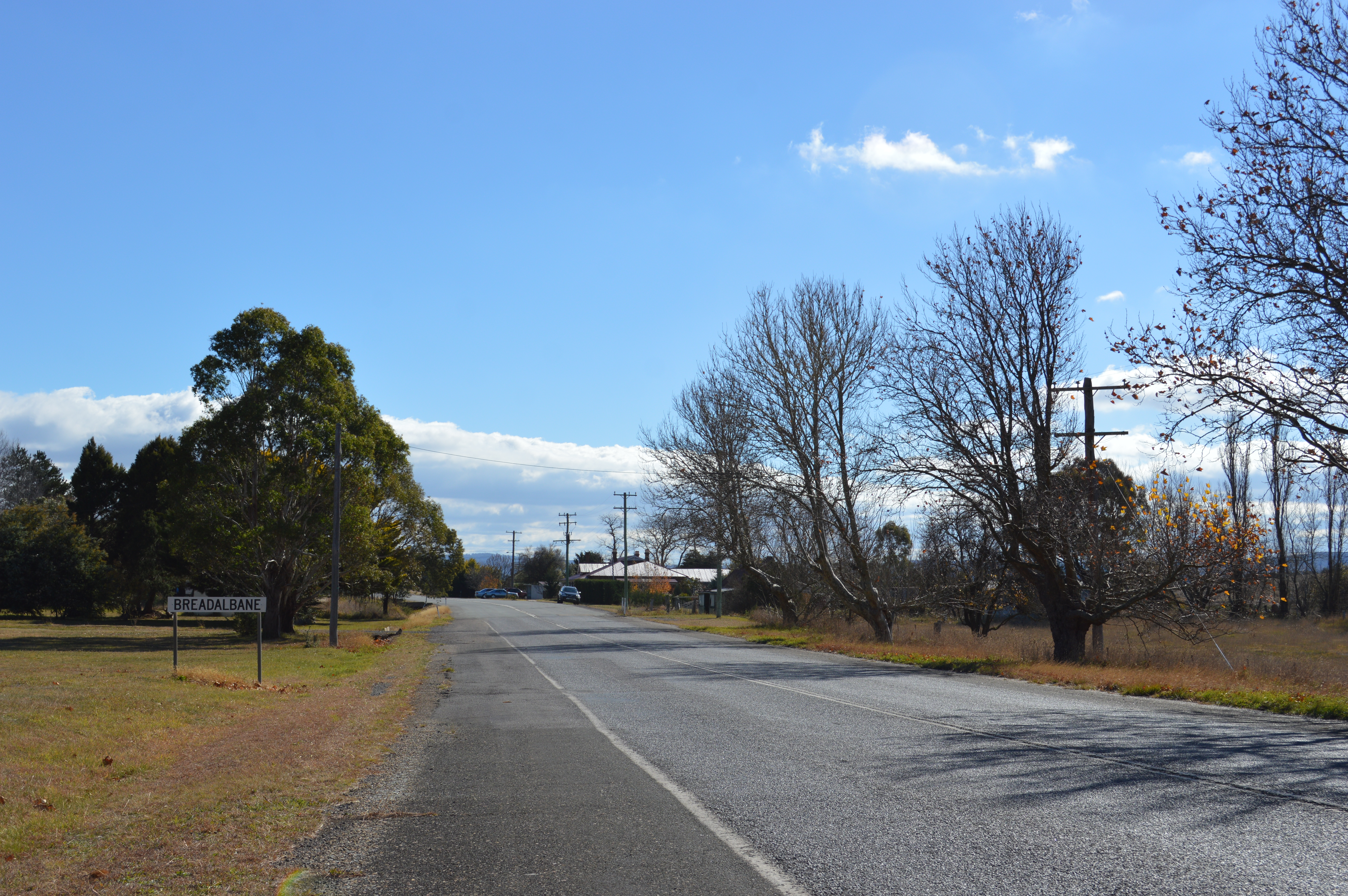

- Coordinates: 34°47′49″S 149°26′50″E
- Country: Australia
- State: New South Wales
- LGA: Upper Lachlan Shire
- Location: 73 km (45 mi) NE of Canberra; 24 km (15 mi) W of Goulburn; 221 km (137 mi) SW of Sydney; 65 km (40 mi) E of Yass

Government
  - State electorate: Goulburn
  - Federal division: Riverina
- Elevation: 700 m (2,300 ft)

Population
  - Total: 107 (2021 census)
- County: Argyle
- Parish: Milbang
Localities around Breadalbane
Cullerin	Bannister	Parkesbourne
Cullerin	Breadalbane	Parkesbourne
Lerida	Collector	Wollogorang

Breadalbane (/brəˈdɔːlbən/) is a small village located in the Southern Tablelands of New South Wales, Australia in Upper Lachlan Shire. It is located on the Lachlan River headwaters and not far from Goulburn. At the 2021 census, Breadalbane had a population of 107.

== Overview ==
Located in the region known natively as "Mulwarry" to the native Wiradjuri people, it was renamed to Breadalbane Plains by Lachlan Macquarie in 1820 (although there is a reference to a Mr. Chisolm naming the location after his home in Scotland.) John Campbell, 1st Marquess of Breadalbane, was a cousin of Macquarie's second wife.

This little town is also located near and adjacent to the major Hume Highway which links Sydney to Melbourne via an inland route. Previously the highway used to go through the small town however it was bypassed in 1993 as part of the Cullerin Range Deviation of the Hume Highway. Breadalbane Railway Station is also situated on the Main Southern Railway, the NSW portion of the Sydney–Melbourne rail line.

The town was originally accessible via tracks arising from early settlement with the first major road into Breadalbane being the Great South Road completed in 1827. Presently, Breadalbane is located near the start of the Federal Highway which branches off the Hume Highway just south of Goulburn and heads directly towards Canberra in the Australian Capital Territory, and the capital city of Australia where the Commonwealth Federal Parliament sits.

Breadalbane is an historic town and it is located on the Old Hume Highway together with Cullerin and Gunning. There is not much now at Breadalbane aside from a few houses. In the past there was accommodation and a pub, service station and a railway station. However, these services are no longer available, although the former hotel and service station remain standing and are today used as private residences. The railway station opened in 1875 and closed in 1974, although the signal box remained in use until 1979. All trace of the station has been removed, although a loading bank is still standing.

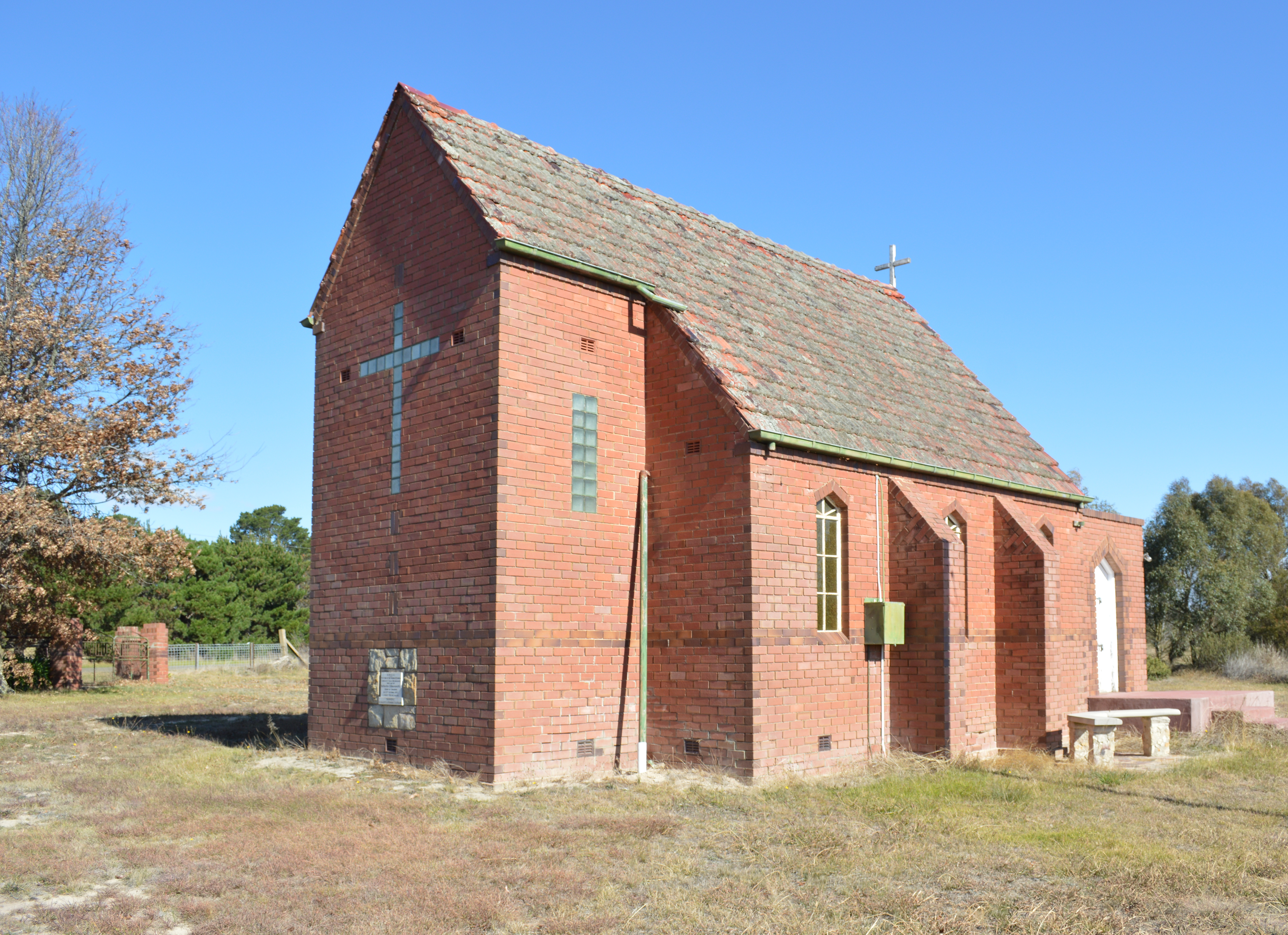
The Chisholm Memorial Church

The Chisholm Memorial Church (St Silas' Anglican church) at Breadalbane was founded in 1937 in memory of Caroline Chisholm.

== Breadalbane Inn ==
The first licence for the Breadalbane Inn was granted on 28-June-1838 to a Mr. John Read. The Inn became a family home soon after the deviation of the Hume Highway and had progressively fallen into disrepair. A recent restoration of the building has uncovered colonial-era artifacts.

On 1 February 1849, the Breadalbane Inn was the scene of a robbery when 3 armed men, "bailed up the host Mr. J. Fletcher" and stole 8 pounds in cash, "as well as some orders".
