= Wollogorang, New South Wales =

Wollogorang
- Town
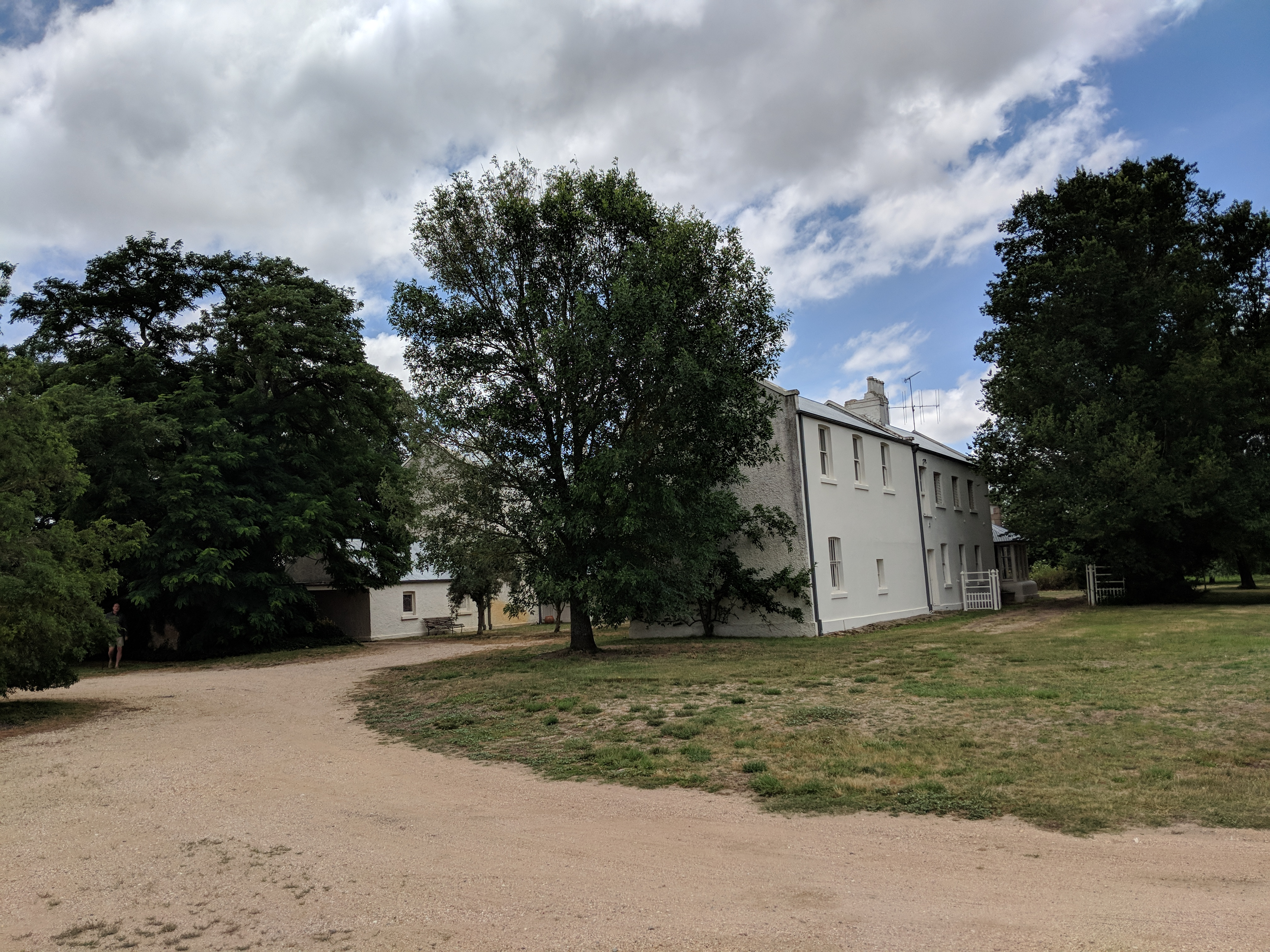
- Wollogorang homestead

- Coordinates: 34°52′57″S 149°31′02″E
- Country: Australia
- State: New South Wales
- Region: Southern Tablelands
- LGAs: Goulburn Mulwaree Council; Upper Lachlan Shire; Queanbeyan–Palerang Regional Council
- Location: 35 km (22 mi) SW of Goulburn; 61 km (38 mi) NE of Canberra; 219 km (136 mi) SW of Sydney

Government
  - State electorate: Goulburn
  - Federal divisions: Riverina; Eden-Monaro
- Elevation: 754 m (2,474 ft)

Population
  - Total: 49 (SAL 2021)
- Postcode: 2581
- County: Argyle
- Parish: Wologorong; Tarago
Localities around Wollogorang
Breadalbane	Parkesbourne	Yarra
Breadalbane	Wollogorang	Yarra
Collector	Currawang	Currawang

Wollogorang is a locality in the Upper Lachlan Shire and Goulburn Mulwaree Council, New South Wales, Australia. A small part of the locality is in Queanbeyan–Palerang Regional Council. It is located about 35 km southwest of Goulburn and 61 km northeast of Canberra. It lies on both sides of the Federal Highway and on the southern side of the Hume Highway. They intersect nearby to the northeast in the locality of Yarra. At the 2021 census, it had a population of 49.

A significant natural feature of the locality is the Wollogorang Lagoon. Wollogorang Road and Thornford Road are other roads in the area.

== History ==
The Wollogorang area was first inhabited by the Gundungurra people and by the mid 1840s the NSW colonial government had granted numerous land grants in the area, beginning white settlement.

Wollogorang homestead was the centre of a major pastoral property that was established in the 19th century. The socialite Sheila Chisholm, who was a friend of George VI and Edward VIII was born and brought up there.

=== Spelling note ===
Wologorong was carelessly applied in early days to the parish name (and has persisted in that sole usage) instead of the original Wologorang and Wollogorang
