= Yarra railway station =

Former railway station in New South Wales, Australia

Yarra
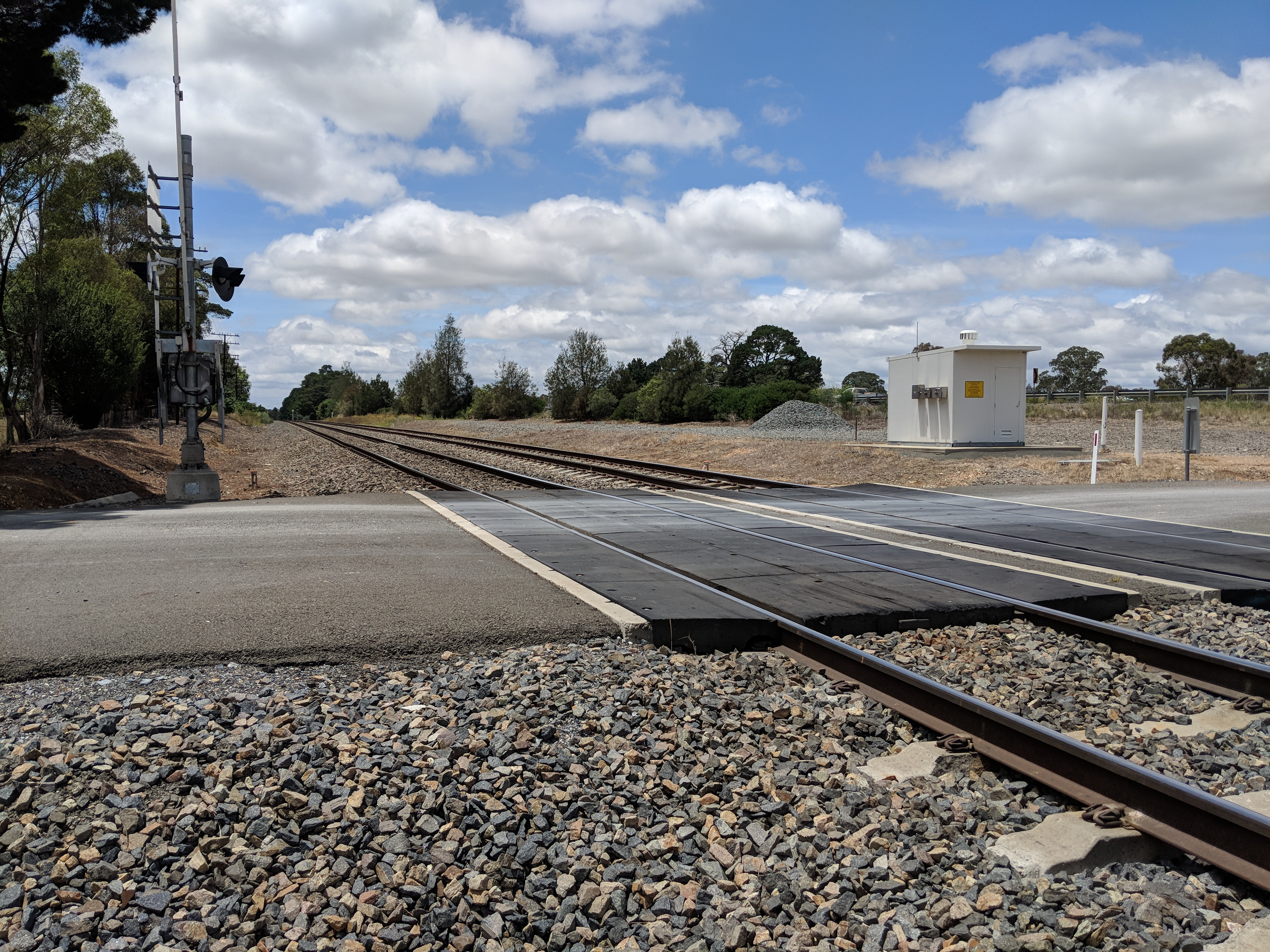
- The level crossing adjacent to the former station site in 20175

General information
- Location: Coles Lane, Yarra, New South Wales; Australia
- Coordinates: 34°47′11″S 149°37′37″E
- Operator: Public Transport Commission
- Line: Main Southern
- Distance: 234.900km from Central
- Platforms: 2 (2 side)
- Tracks: 2

Construction
- Structure type: Ground

Other information
- Status: Closed

History
- Opened: 9 November 1875
- Closed: c.1977
- Former names: Collector (1875-1878)

Services
Preceding station	Former services	Following station
Breadalbane towards Albury	Main Southern Line	Goulburn towards Sydney
Location

Yarra railway station was a railway station on the Main Southern railway line, serving the locality of Yarra, New South Wales, Australia. It opened in 1875 initially as Collector, and was renamed Yarra on 15 April 1878. It was closed to passenger services in the late 1970s. It was later completely demolished and no trace of the station now survives. East of the station is Joppa Junction, the junction of the Main South line and the Bombala line, which branches at Queanbeyan for Canberra.

The locality of Yarra was named after the railway station in 1906. The name of the locality was previously Run of Water from 1869–73, Waterland from 1874-81, and then again Run of Water 1883-1906. There is no findable record of the origin of any of these names, or if 'Yarra' bears any relation to the river of the same name in Melbourne, Victoria.
