= Currawang =

- Cadastral division
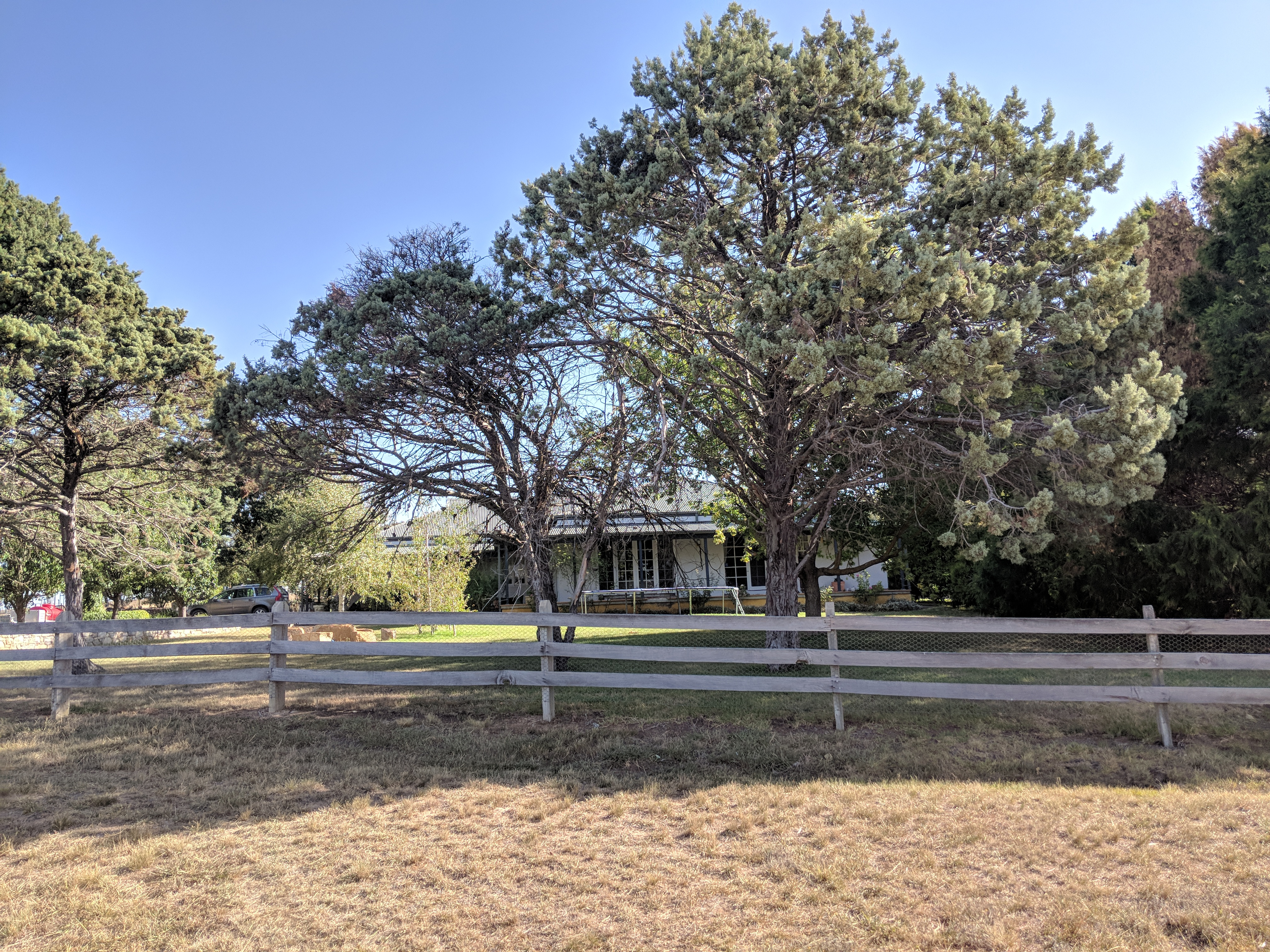
- House in Currawang

- Interactive map of Currawang
- Coordinates: 34°57′57″S 149°31′02″E
- Country: Australia
- State: New South Wales
- Region: Southern Tablelands
- LGAs: Queanbeyan-Palerang Region; Upper Lachlan Shire; Goulburn-Mulwaree Council
- Location: 40 km (25 mi) SW of Goulburn; 60 km (37 mi) NE of Canberra; 20 km (12 mi) NW of Tarago; 237 km (147 mi) SW of Sydney

Government
  - State electorate: Monaro
  - Federal divisions: Eden-Monaro; Riverina
- Elevation: 814 m (2,671 ft)

Population
  - Total: 167 (SAL 2021)
- Postcode: 2580
- County: Argyle
- Parish: Currawang
Lands administrative divisions around Currawang
Collector	Wollogorang	Yarra
Collector	Currawang	Lake Bathurst
Lake George	Lake George	Tarago

Currawang is a rural locality, located to the north of Lake George in New South Wales, Australia. It lies on the intersection between three councils, with the majority straddling the boundary between the Queanbeyan–Palerang Regional Council and Goulburn-Mulwaree Council and a small portion of the locality in the Upper Lachlan Shire. There was once a mining settlement of the same name, now a ghost town. It shares its name with the Currawang Parish of Argyle County, in which it is located. This was formerly known as the parish of Currowang. Both names derive from an Aboriginal word for the spearwood tree (Acacia doratoxylon).

== History ==
=== Aboriginal history ===
The area of Currawang was first inhabited by Gundungurra people, who called the area Werriwa, and who were apparently badly affected by influenza in 1846/47.

=== Early settler history ===
An early settler in the area was Francis Kenny who, around 1824, was granted 120 acres, in the southern part of what is now Currawang, near a landform still known as Kenny's Point, on the northern shoreline of Lake George. One of Kenny's assigned convict servants was Garrett Cotter (after whom the Cotter River is named) and his absentee neighbouring landholder of was Robert Cooper.

By the mid 1840s, the NSW colonial government had made numerous land grants in area, and both the Kenny and Cooper families had taken up more land in what is now Currawang. A post office was established at Kenny's Point by 1859, and there was a provisional school established there in 1867.

Copper was soon discovered, as was gold, 7 km (4.3 mi) to the west, and a town of Currawang soon sprang up.

=== Mining ===
The Currawang Copper Mining Company was set up in 1865 to mine the copper deposit. Surface ore had grades up to 27% copper. There was also gossan containing small amounts of gold and silver. Ore was smelted on site using locally-cut wood as fuel from early 1868. However, the mine had financial difficulties and closed in late 1868, being revived later as the Phoenix Mine. The new operations were managed by Eynon Deer. In 1876, the copper smelter was owned by Lewis Lloyd. The mine operated successfully for a time, but it closed in 1882, due to declining ore grades.

The Phoenix Mine and the land on which it stood were up for sale in 1885. More ore was discovered at the old mine, and operations recommenced under new ownership, in 1896. However, the new company was wound up in 1897. The mine dump contained significant amounts of copper, gold and silver, and an attempt was made to revive the mine in 1907. In that year, the right to operate the mine was purchased by the Collins Brothers, owners of the Exeter Colliery, between Exeter and Bundanoon, and an option over it was taken up by a Melbourne syndicate. In 1912, it was proposed to build a water-jacket furnace to reprocess slag from the old reverberatory furnace operations; it was to use coal and coke brought from the Exeter Colliery, but that did not eventuate.

In 1923, an application was made to reprocess the slag heap, but this application was refused. There were attempts to set up syndicates to recommence mining, in 1932 and 1933, but these appear to have failed. The last mining activity in the old mine was a fruitless search for uranium, in 1948.

The mining operations had left the land scarred and eroded—it was compared with the notorious environmental damage at Queenstown—and contaminated runoff water was entering Lake George.

Just outside the locality, to the south-east off the road to Tarago—Collector Road—are the remains of a large 20th-century mine, Woodlawn Mine. In 1987, the operator of that mine began developing a previously undiscovered deposit of lead-silver-zinc sulphide ore that it had identified, in 1973, at Currawang. This time, the ore was trucked to the main Woodlawn operation closer to Tarago. Approximately 500,000 tons of high-grade ore was extracted during the mid-1990s.

As a part of the work, a large agricultural dam was built—diverting water away from both the old and new mine workings—the old workings were pumped out, and the old mining area was rehabilitated by scraping mining and smelting waste, into an open cut pit and elsewhere on the site, then capping it with a layer of clay.

=== Mining town of Currawang ===
It appears that the entire settlement and the mine itself lay on private landholdings, although it was served by a public road, the modern-day Currawang Road. The settlement was always of a scattered nature with houses being erected close to the mine and smelter. It seems never to have had any designated streets, other than the main road, despite housing a population that may have reached as high as 2,000, during the late 1860s and 1870s.

The town had a post office, shops, primary school and two churches. In 1876, it had around 50 houses, four stores, a blacksmith, Anglican and Wesleyan churches, two hotels (one of which also hosted Catholic services), and even a brewery. The post office opened in 1866. The Currawang Public School—situated on the main road to the west of the Anglican Church—operated from 1870 until 1944, closing because the number of pupils declined. To the north of the site of the main settlement of Currawang, at Spring Valley, there was a Catholic School from 1863—predating mining at Currawang—and in 1883 a Catholic church opened there.

Many of the miners and smelters were Welsh and Wesleyan. Most of them left Currawang, as mining declined; some moved to another copper mining community, Frogmore.

The little town had all but disappeared by 1948, leaving only the post office, a telephone exchange with only nine subscribers, and Anglican and Catholic churches. The post office closed on 31 March 1962.

=== Village of Murray ===
In the southern part of the modern-day locality of Currawang, there was another planned settlement. In 1886, a site was reserved for a village to be officially known as Murray, on the northern shoreline of Lake George, just west of the landform known as Kenny's Point. It is likely that the planned village took its name from, Terence Aubrey Murray, whose property, Winderradeen, was to the north of Lake George, west of Currawang, near to what is still called Murray's Lagoon. Although the village was surveyed and allotments put up for sale in 1887 and 1910, the village seems not to have developed. Its design was cancelled in 1919. Its site was just beyond the end of modern-day Lake George Road.

== Currawang today ==
As a result of mine rehabilitation work, there is no obvious evidence of past mining or smelting operations today, and the locality of Currawang possesses a notable rural scenic beauty. Although there is no mining in the area now, it remains of interest for mineral exploration.

Pastoralism remains the dominant part of the economy, however employment also comes from the waste management facilities reusing the former mine sites, and the recently constructed. Capital Wind Farm. There is still an active Rural Fire Service Brigade.

Today the main remaining buildings are its Catholic (St Laurence O'Toole, also known as the 'Hermitage Church', at Spring Valley, opened 1883) and Anglican (St. Matthias, opened in 1875) church buildings and their associated cemeteries. St Matthias is part of the Mulwaree Mission District and has a quarterly service led by the Hon. Priest-in-Charge, Tom Frame (former Bishop to the Defence Force). The churchyard cemetery continues to be used for burials and interment of ashes.

Picnic Point on the northern shore of Lake George is named for the miner's picnics that took place there in the heyday of mining.

== Images ==
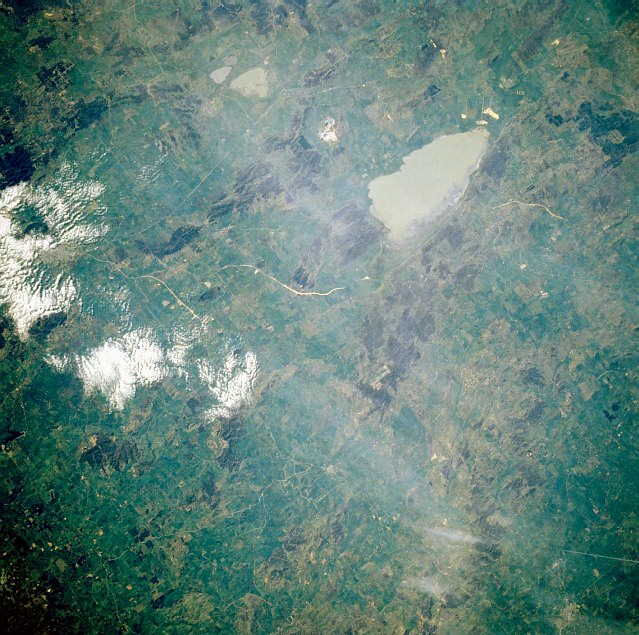
Lake George from space, November 1985

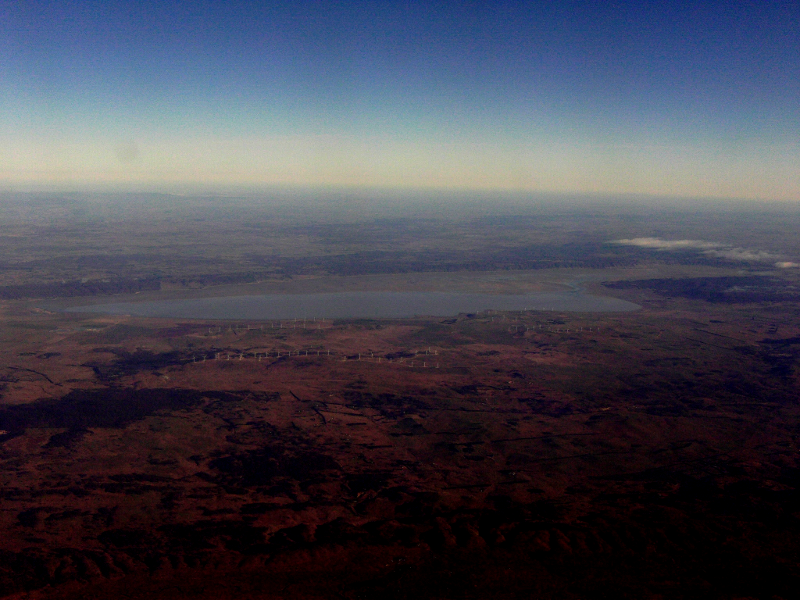
August 2010, aerial view looking northwest over the wind farm.

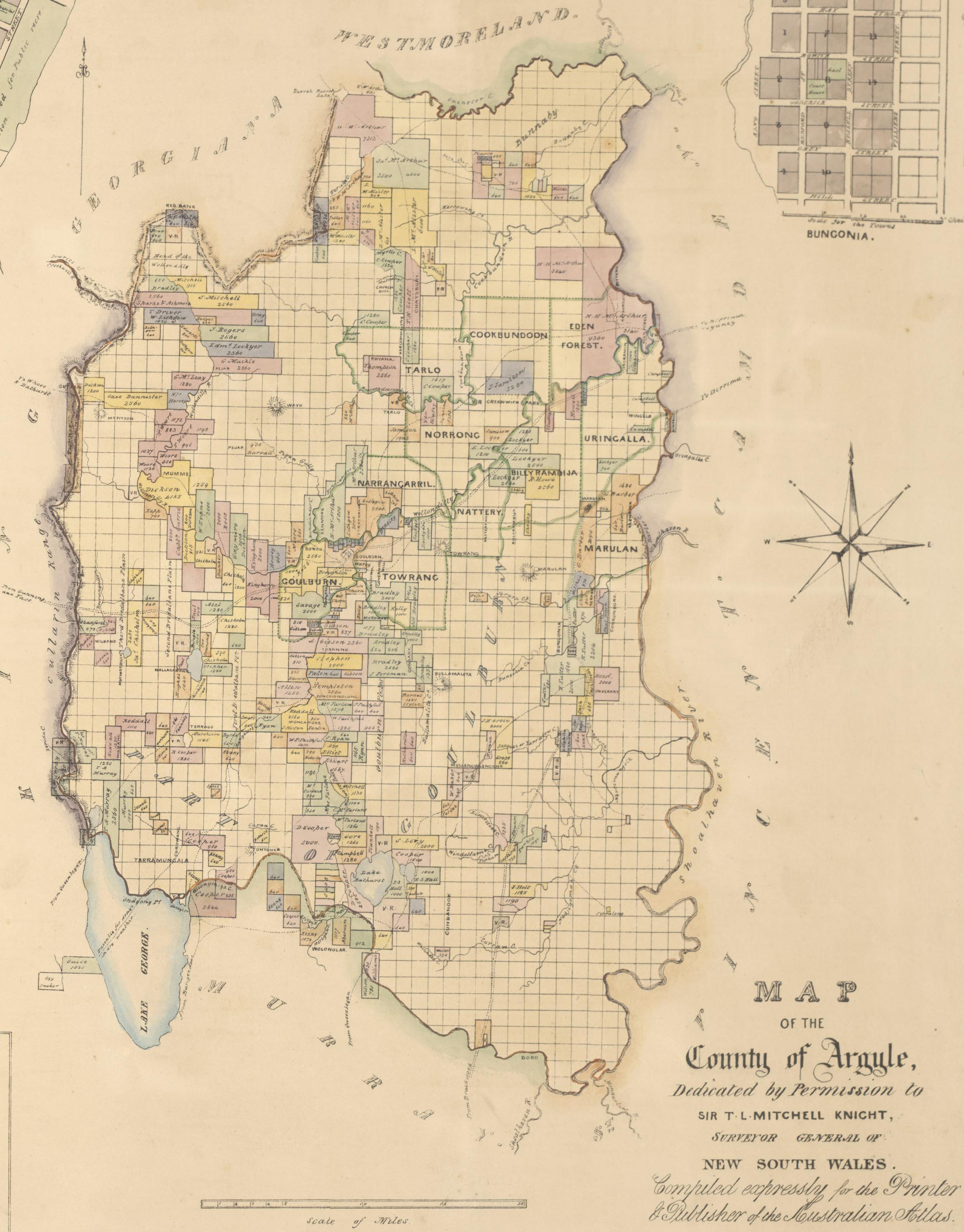
1840s map of the County of Argyle

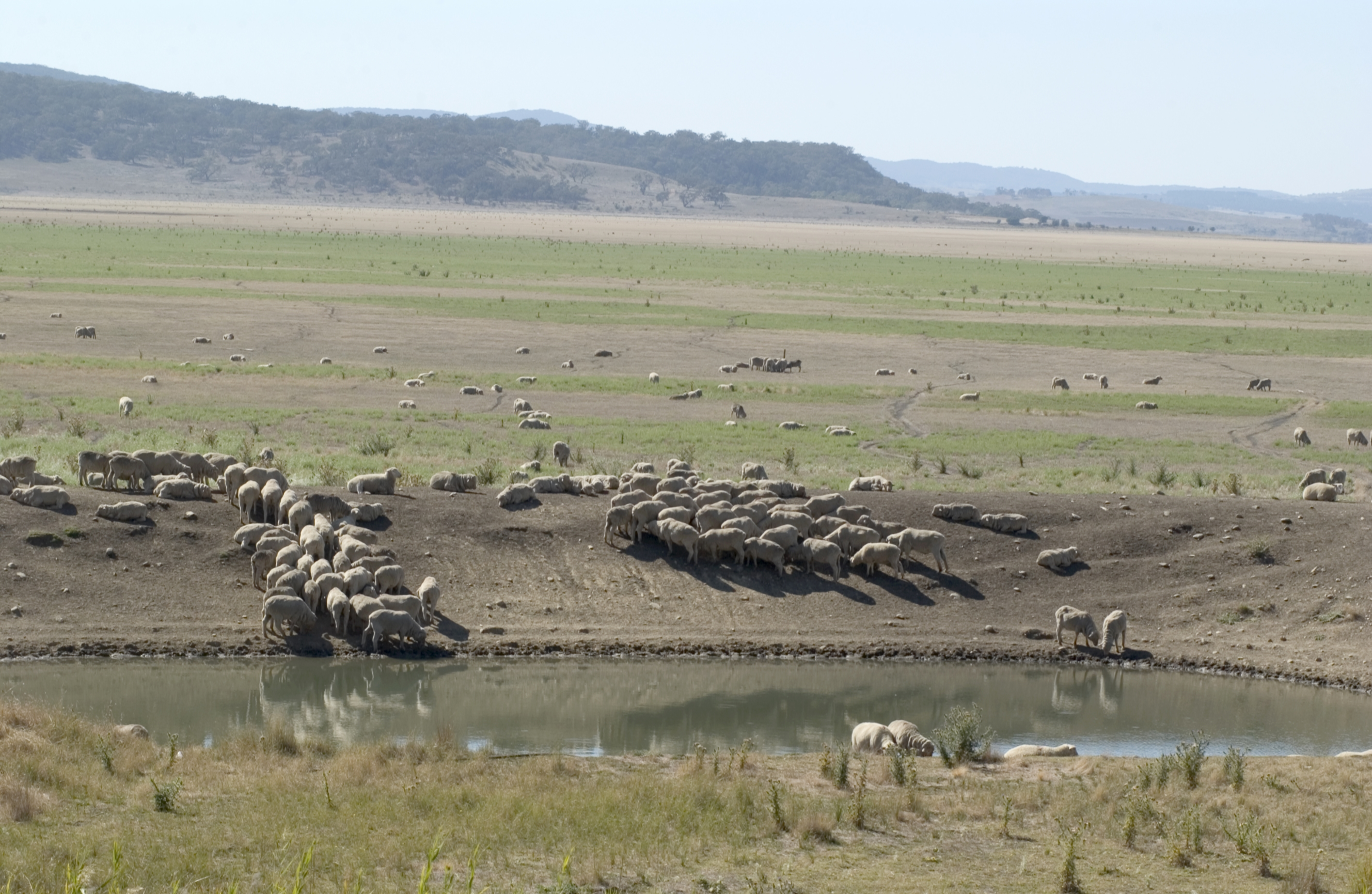
Currowang in the distance

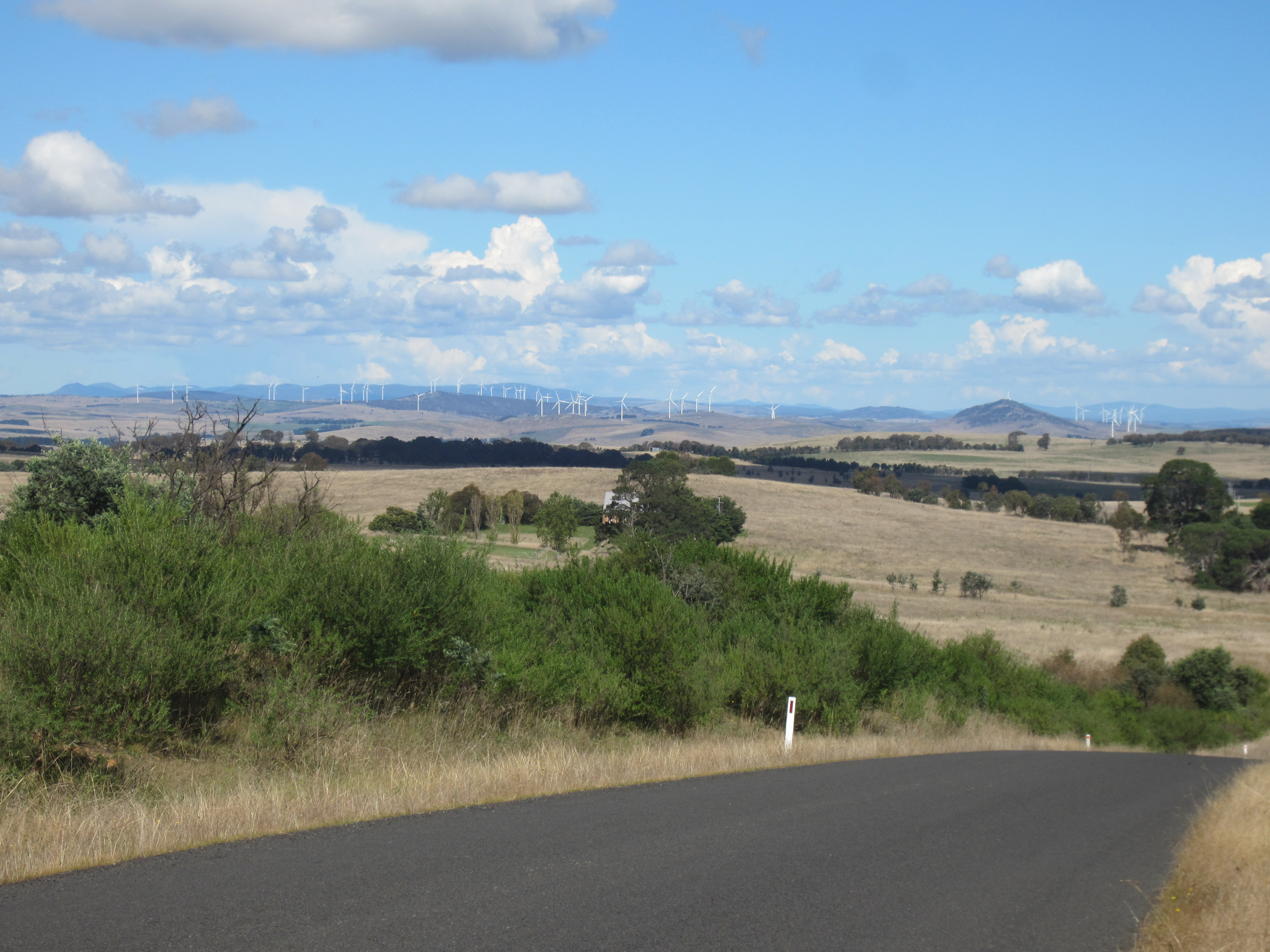
View from Currawang Rd, Looking South-East (April 2021)

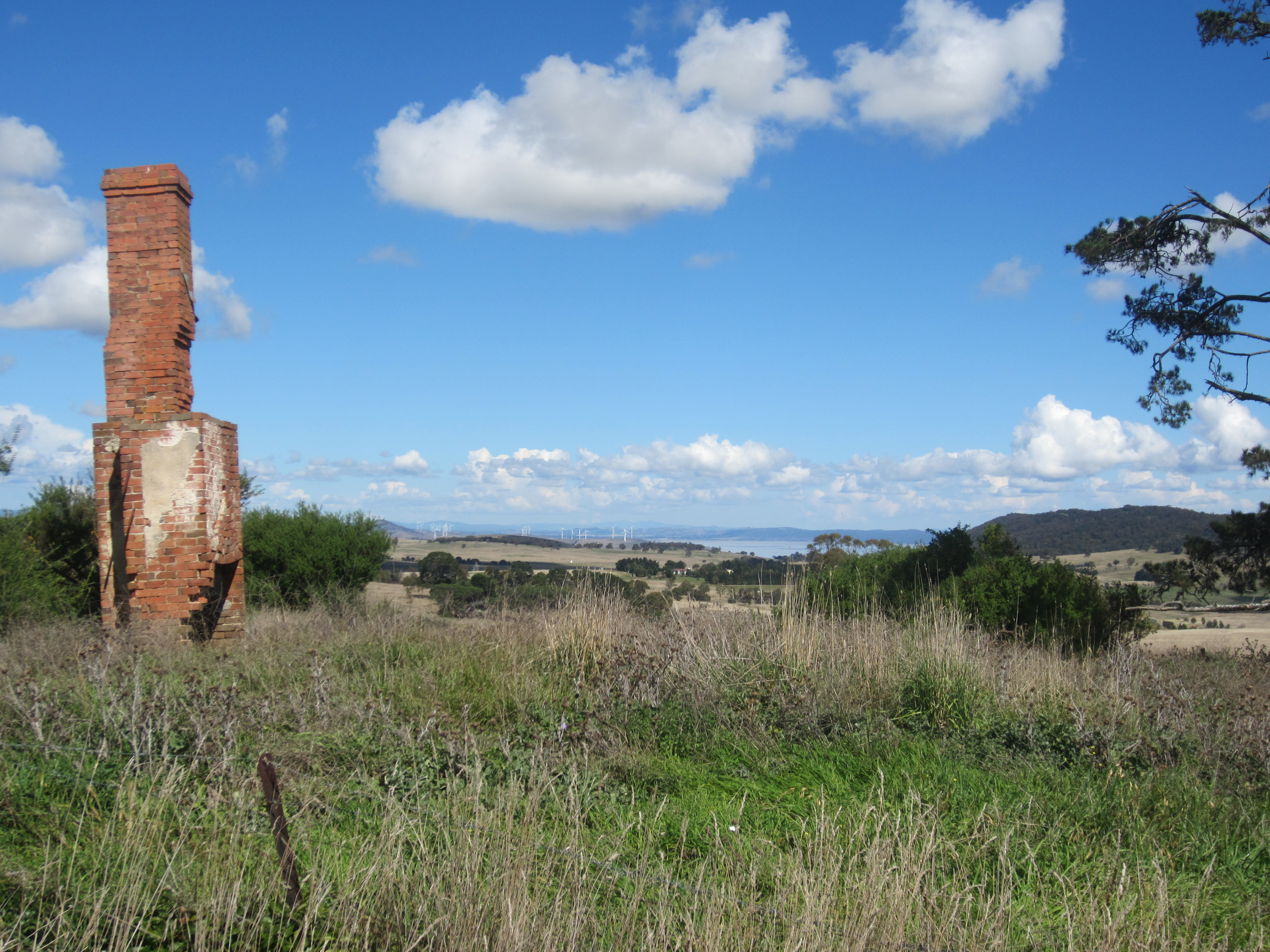
Ruin at Currawang, looking south with Lake George in the background
