= Cullerin =

- Town
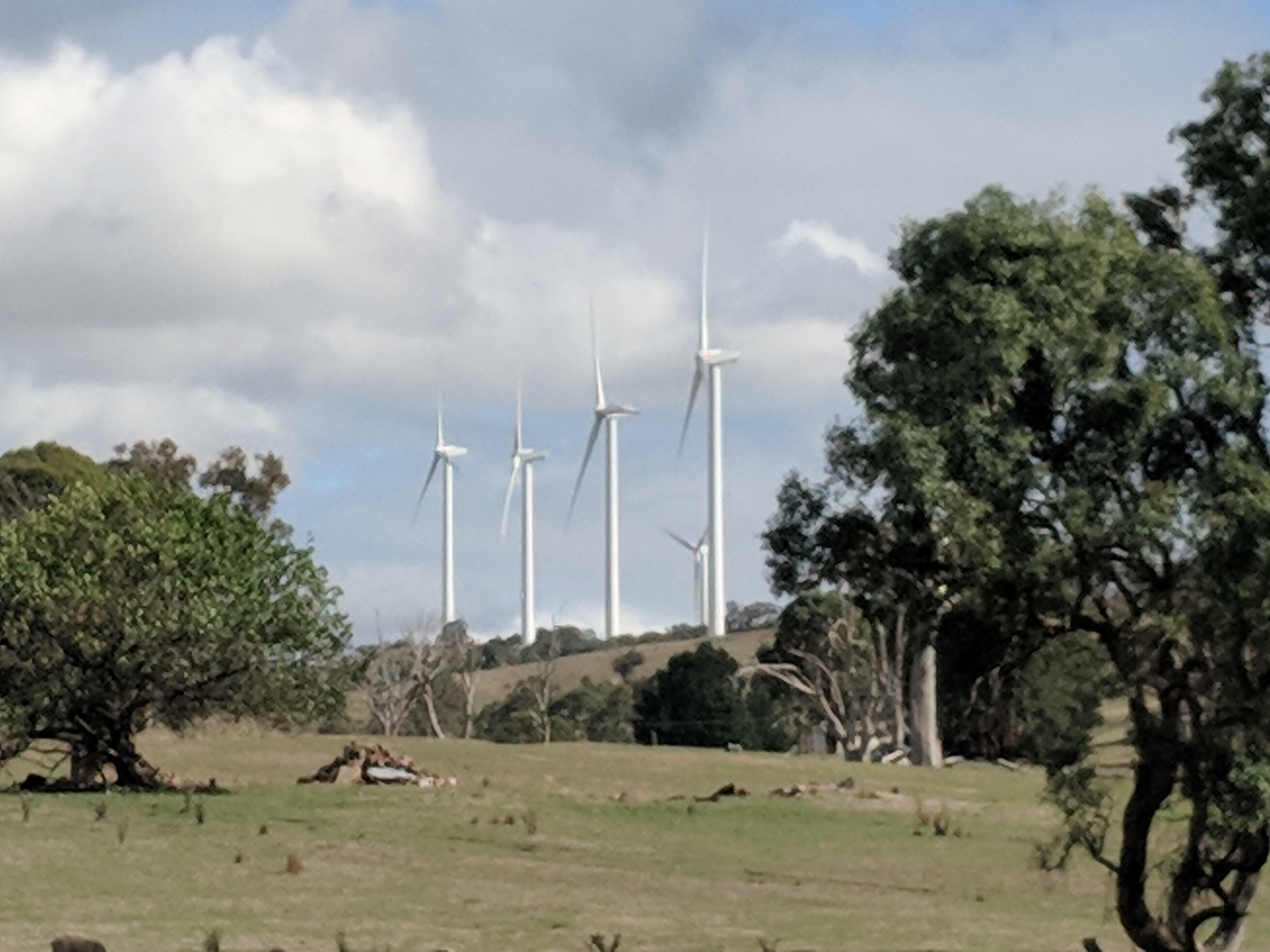
- Cullerin Range Wind Farm from Cullerin

- Coordinates: 34°46′41″S 149°21′29″E
- Country: Australia
- State: New South Wales
- LGA: Upper Lachlan Shire
- Location: 237 km (147 mi) SW of Sydney; 40 km (25 mi) W of Goulburn; 16 km (9.9 mi) E of Gunning; 46 km (29 mi) E of Yass

Government
  - State electorate: Goulburn
  - Federal division: Riverina
- Elevation: 649 m (2,129 ft)

Population
  - Total: 38 (2016 census)
- Postcode: 2581
- County: King
- Parish: Cullarin
Localities around Cullerin
Merrill	Gurrundah	Gurrundah
Gunning	Cullerin	Breadalbane
Bellmount Forest	Lerida	Collector

Cullerin (/kʌləˈrən/) is a small township in the Southern Tablelands of New South Wales, Australia. It is on the Old Hume Highway and Main South railway line in Upper Lachlan Shire. The Cullerin railway station opened in 1880 and closed in 1973. At the 2016 census, it had a population of 38.

== Transport ==
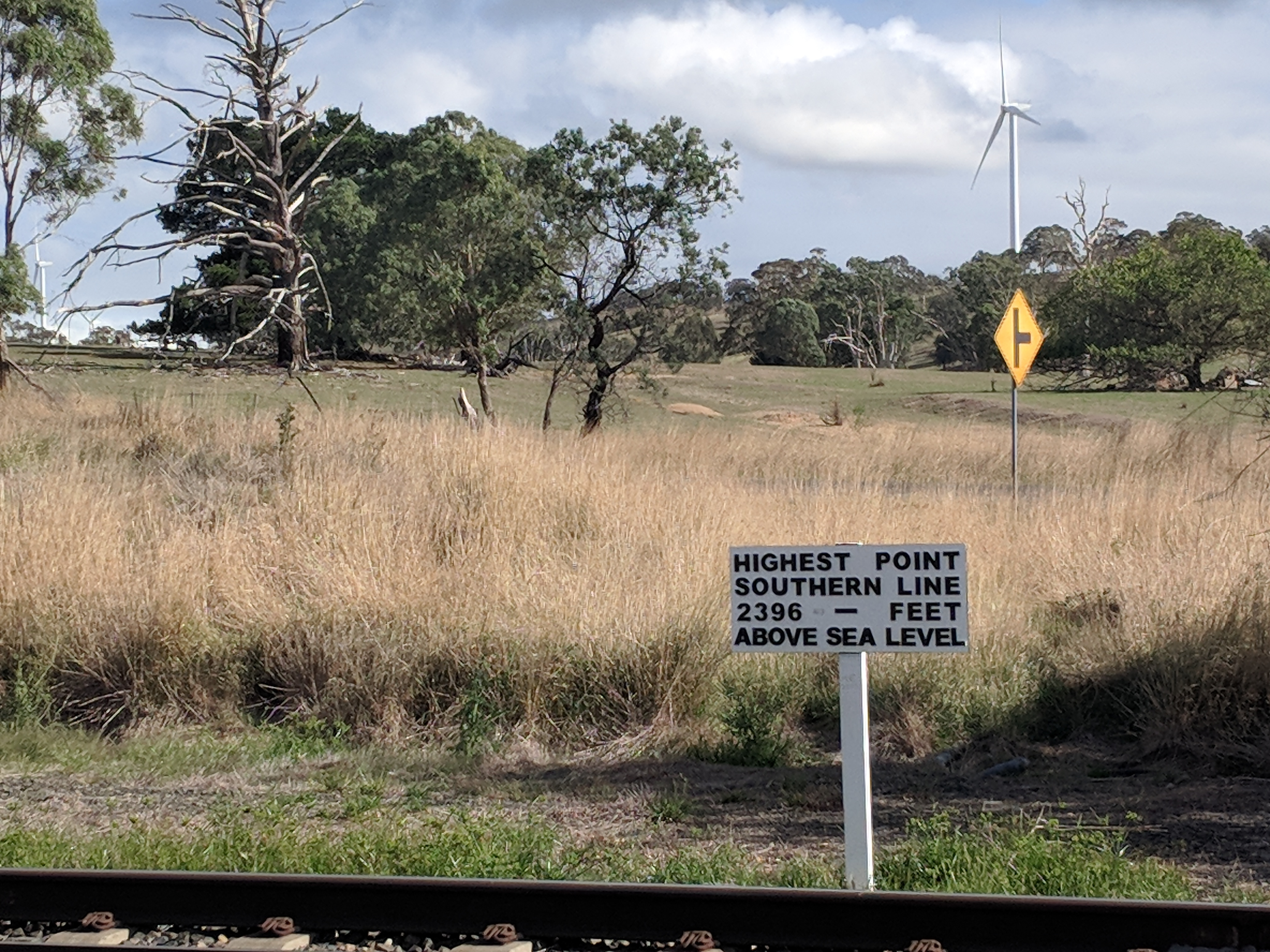
Highest point of Sydney-Melbourne railway at Cullerin

Cullerin is at the summit of a 15 km (9.3 mi) stretch of ruling grade of the Main Southern Rail line. It lies a few kilometres west of the Great Dividing Range. The Lachlan River and other rivers to the west flow inland, while the Wollondilly River and other rivers to the east flow to the Pacific.
