= Collector, New South Wales =

Collector
- Town
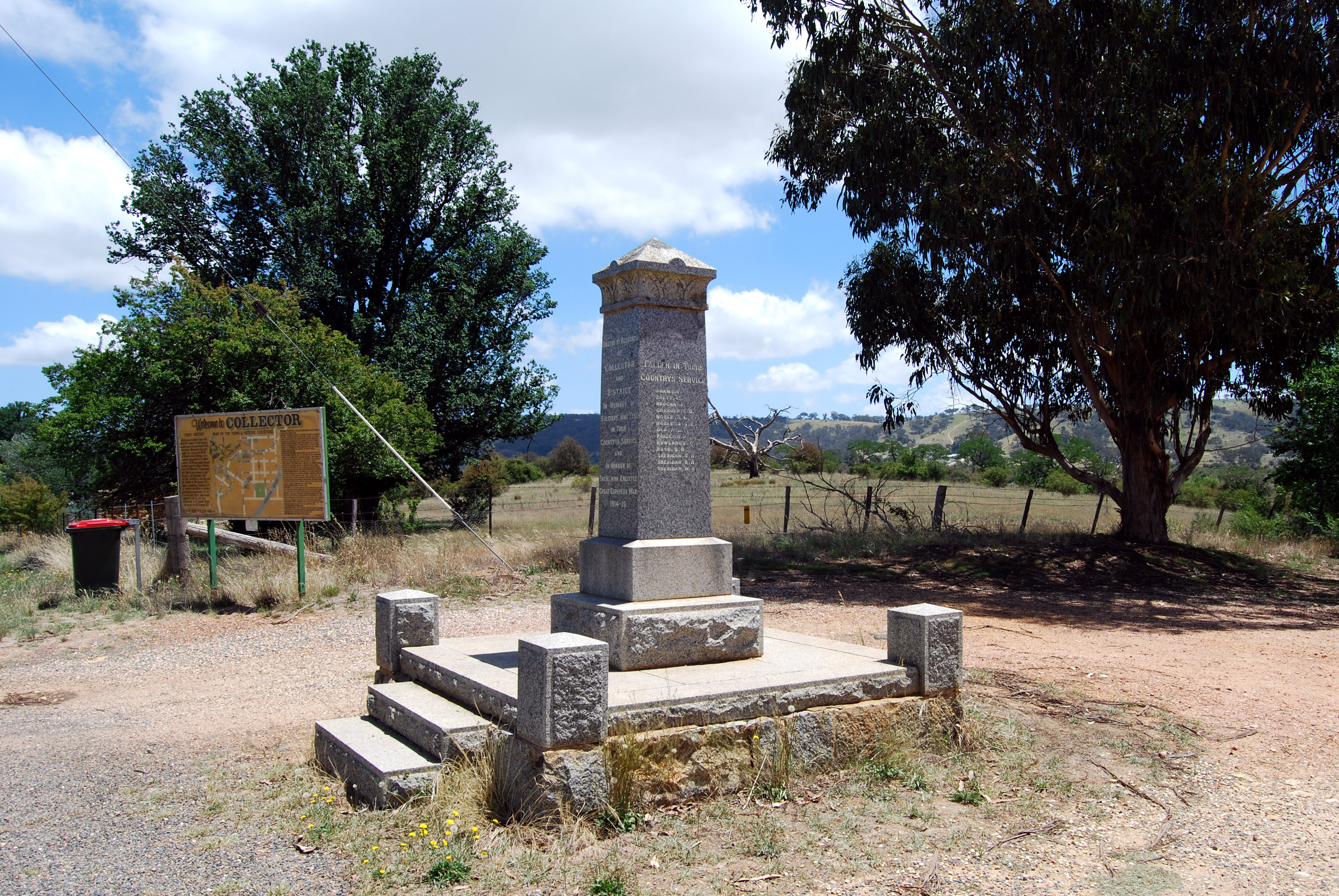
- The War Memorial at Collector

- Coordinates: 34°55′S 149°26′E
- Country: Australia
- State: New South Wales
- LGAs: Upper Lachlan; Queanbeyan–Palerang; Yass Valley
- Location: 35 km (22 mi) SW of Goulburn; 231 km (144 mi) SW of Sydney; 56 km (35 mi) NE of Canberra

Government
  - State electorate: Goulburn
  - Federal divisions: Eden-Monaro; Riverina
- Elevation: 697 m (2,287 ft)

Population
  - Total: 376 (2021 census)
- Postcode: 2581
- County: Argyle
- Parish: Collector
Localities around Collector
Cullerin	Breadalbane	Wollogorang
Lerida	Collector	Currawang
Gundaroo	Lake George	Currawang

Collector is a small village on the Federal Highway in New South Wales, Australia halfway between Goulburn and the Australian Capital Territory. It is seven kilometres north of Lake George. The name is also applied to the surrounding area, for postal and statistical purposes. At the 2021 census, Collector and the surrounding district had a population of 376.

== History ==
The area was first settled by Europeans in 1829 when Terence Aubrey Murray was granted an area of land in the area in 1829, originally called Old Collector. Murray acquired further land in the area and renamed his property Winderradeen where he built a 12-room house on the land in 1837. At about the same time he also acquired the property of Yarralumla on the Limestone Plains, now Government House. A post office opened at Collector in 1848. The village reportedly is named after the Aboriginal name for the region, colegdar. The town was bypassed in June 1988 as part of upgrade works on the Federal Highway, including the construction of a bridge across the Collector Creek floodplain providing all weather access to Canberra. The village has struggled to remain viable, once a convenient stopover for travellers between Sydney and Canberra most of the businesses in town had relied on the passing trade.

The Bushranger Hotel in Collector was the site of a shooting of a Constable Samuel Nelson on 26 Jan 1865, by John Dunn, a member of Ben Hall's gang. A memorial was placed to mark the site of Nelson's grave a century later on 26 January 1965.

== Heritage listings ==
Collector has a number of heritage-listed sites, including:

- 24 Church Street (Federal Highway): Bushranger Hotel

== Present day ==
Collector is situated in the Lake George wine region, and several wineries have been established near the village, including Lerida Estate, Lake George Winery and the award-winning Collector Wines. The Collector Village Pumpkin Festival has been held annually since 2003. This traditional harvest festival offers market stalls, live music and entertainment, local produce as well as vintage car and farming machinery displays. Collector is increasing in popularity as a commuter town due to its proximity to the larger centres of Goulburn and Canberra, with new residents attracted by the country lifestyle and village atmosphere. There is a small public primary school located in the village, with 28 students enrolled in 2007. Collector Public School is a combined Primary school, serving years K-6. The uniform is compulsory and enforced.

== Dreamer's Gate ==
Dreamer's Gate
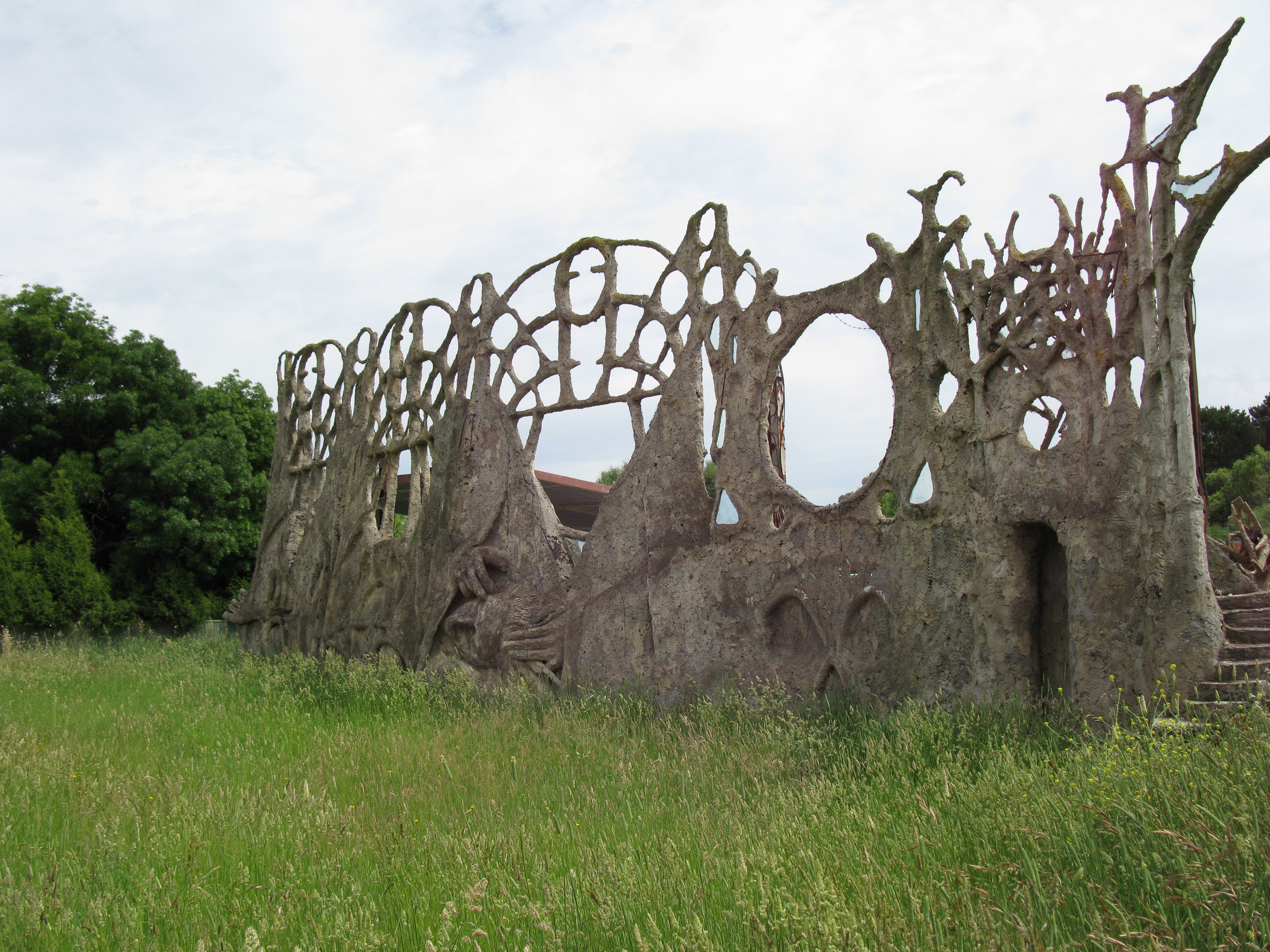
- Artist: Tony Phantastes
- Year: 1993 - 1997
- Type: Concrete on a chicken wire and wooden frame
- Location: Collector, New South Wales, Australia

Collector is also famous for the controversial sculpture Dreamer by Tony Phantastes, built between 1993 and 1997 to commemorate, among other things, his father and son's life. His artistic vision was to create a wonderland to document the history of Australian land-use practices. A Gothic structure of cement and chicken wire, the artist and the Gunning Shire Council are in constant battle regarding the structure since 1999. The plot in which the sculpture stands was for sale and the sculpture itself under demolition orders but still stands as of May 2021. Unfortunately, the piece has started to rust and has become structurally unstable.

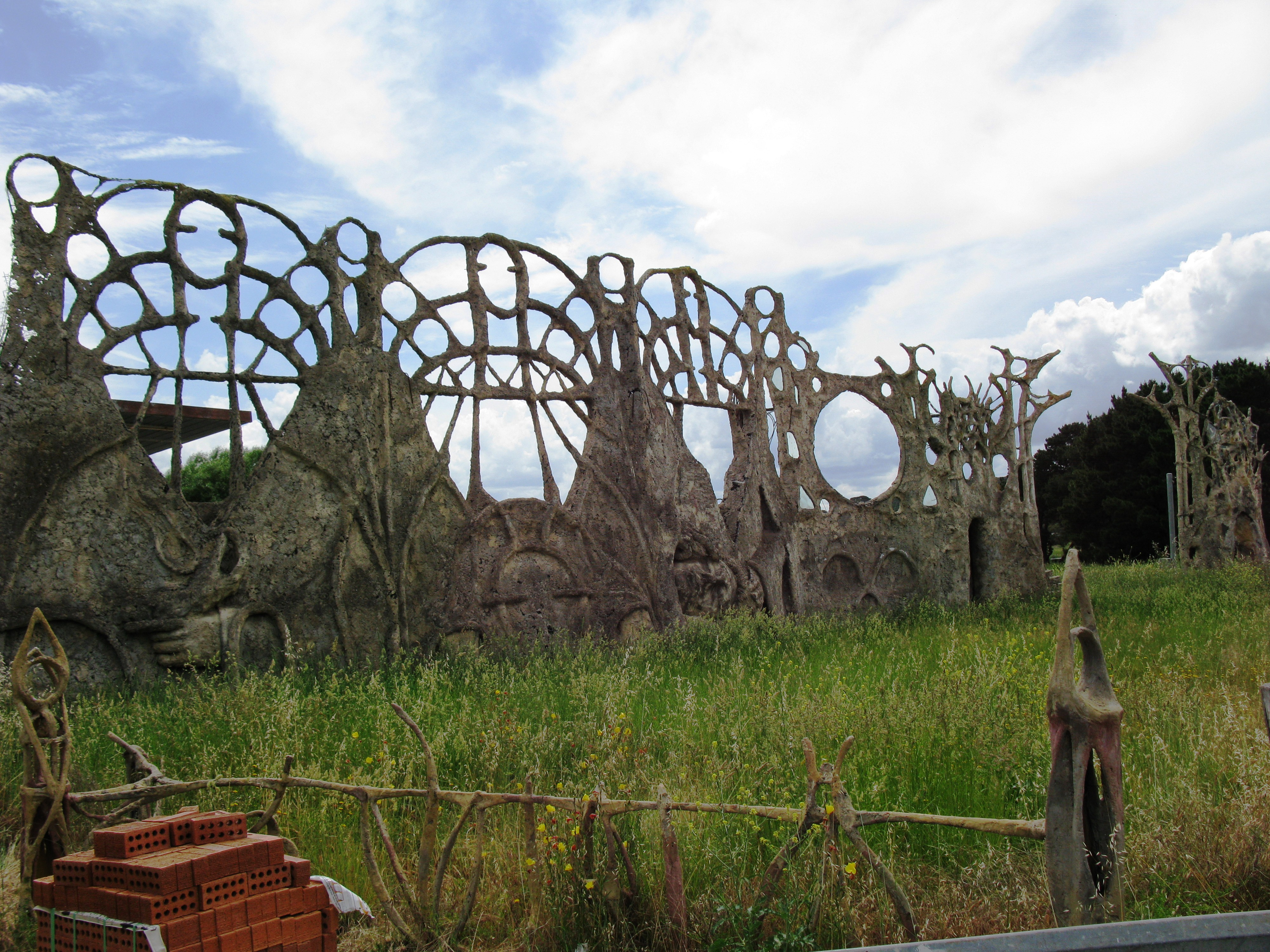
front view

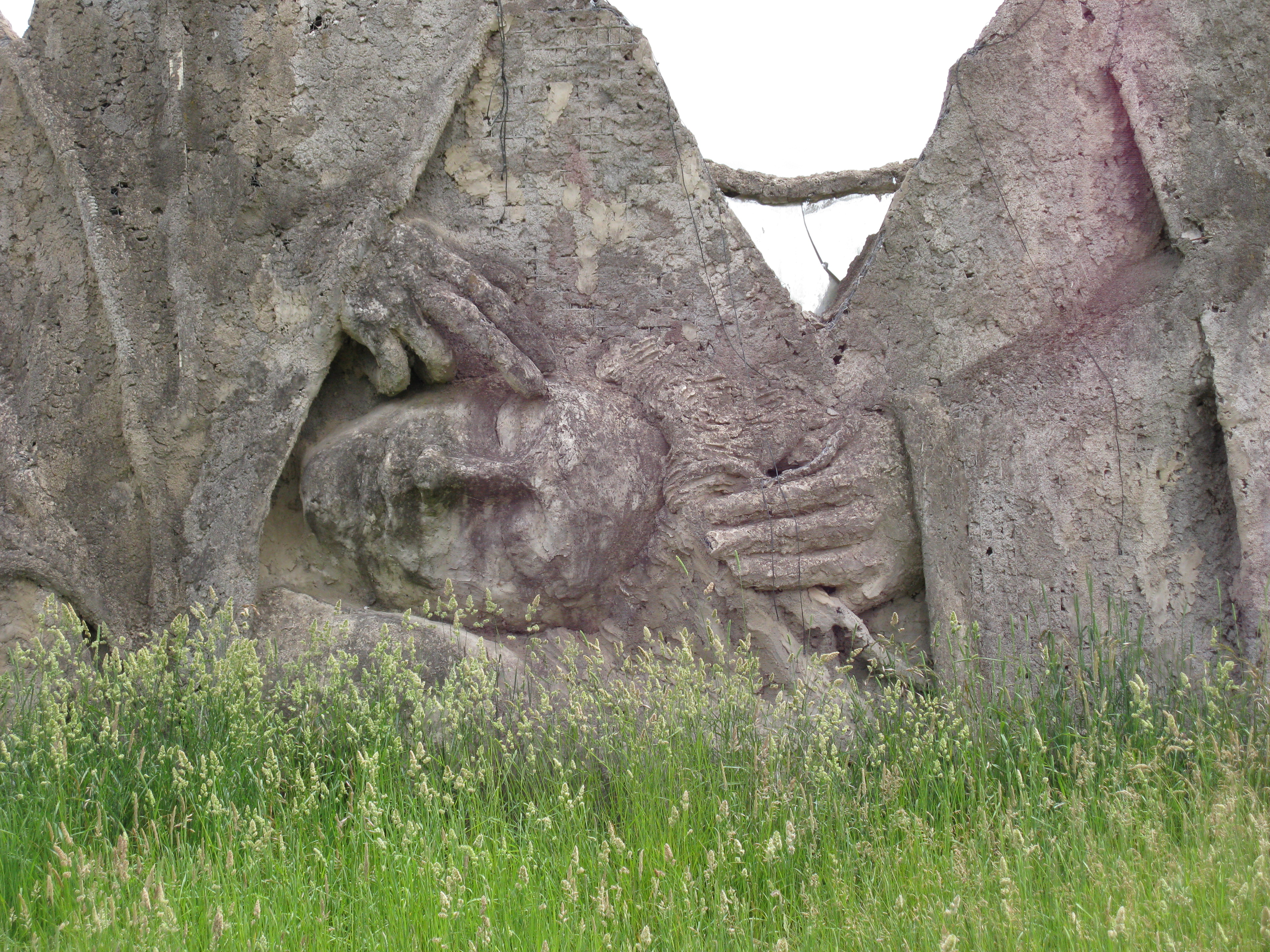
detail
