= Limerick, New South Wales =

Locality in Australia

Limerick
- Town
- Coordinates: 34.1314°S 149.2909°E
- Country: Australia
- State: New South Wales
- Region: Southern Tablelands
- LGA: Upper Lachlan Shire
- Location: 164 km (102 mi) W of Sydney; 122 km (76 mi) N of Canberra

Government
  - State electorate: Goulburn
  - Federal division: Riverina
- Elevation: 778 m (2,552 ft)

Population
  - Total: 33 (SAL 2021)
- Postcode: 2583
Localities around Limerick
Peelwood	Fullerton	Fullerton
Crooked Corner	Limerick	Golspie
Binda	Laggan	Golspie

Limerick is a locality within the Upper Lachlan Shire of New South Wales, Australia. At the 2021 census, Limerick had a population of 33. It is named after Limerick and its county in Ireland.

The locality contains Cooks Vale Creek, a stream which is part of the Lachlan sub-catchment of the Murrumbidgee catchment within the Murray-Darling Basin. This creek rises in the south of the locality near Cuddyong Road and flows north, reaching a confluence with the Abercrombie River east of the town of Tuena. A smaller creek, Deep Creek, rises in the west of the locality and is a tributary of Cooks Vale Creek, the two creeks coming to a confluence in the north-east of the locality.

The main road running through Limerick is Peelwood Road, which continues to Tuena in the north and the council seat of Crookwell in the south.

St Fiacre's Catholic Church was opened in Limerick in 1912, and was part of the Parish of Crookwell, and the Diocese of Canberra and Goulburn. The church fell into disuse in the 1970s due to a shortage of priests and dwindling congregations, and the church was closed in April 2012. The church building still stands near Peelwood Road, at 34.205578°S 149.478751°E.
