= Peelwood Creek =

River in Australia

Peelwood Kangaloolah
- Location of the Peelwood Creek mouth in New South Wales

Location
- Country: Australia
- State: New South Wales
- Region: South Western Slopes (IBRA), South West Slopes
- LGA: Upper Lachlan

Physical characteristics
- Source: Great Dividing Range
  - location: north of Binda
  - coordinates: 34°14′12″S 149°24′20″E
  - elevation: 843 m (2,766 ft)
- Mouth: Tuena Creek
  - location: east of Bigga and south of Tuena
  - coordinates: 34°2′6″S 149°21′52″E
  - elevation: 497 m (1,631 ft)
- Length: 33 km (21 mi)

Basin features
- River system: Lachlan sub–catchment, Murray–Darling basin

The Peelwood Creek, a watercourse that is part of the Lachlan sub-catchment of the Murrumbidgee catchment within the Murray–Darling basin, is located in the South West Slopes region of New South Wales, Australia.

== Course and features ==
The Peelwood Creek (technically a river) rises in remote country north of Binda and Crookwell, sourced by runoff from the Great Dividing Range. The creek flows generally north, then northeast, then northwest by west, before reaching its confluence with the Tuena Creek, itself a tributary of the Lachlan River, east of Bigga, south of Tuena, and southeast of Woodstock. The creek descends 346 metres (1,135 ft) over its 33-kilometre (21 mi) course.

== See also ==
- List of rivers of New South Wales (L-Z)
- Rivers of New South Wales
