= Reids Flat =

- Town
- Coordinates: 34°07′57″S 149°01′02″E
- Country: Australia
- State: New South Wales
- LGA: Hilltops Council
- Location: 344 km (214 mi) SW of Sydney; 149 km (93 mi) NW of Goulburn; 51 km (32 mi) NE of Boorowa; 142 km (88 mi) SW of Bathurst; 66 km (41 mi) SE of Cowra

Government
  - State electorate: Goulburn
  - Federal division: Riverina
- Elevation: 407 m (1,335 ft)

Population
  - Total: 85 (SAL 2021)
- Postcode: 2586
Localities around Reids Flat
Hovells Creek	Wyangala	Roseberg
Frogmore	Reids Flat	Bigga
Frogmore	Taylors Flat	Crooked Corner

Reids Flat is a historic village, originally known as Numby, in regional New South Wales located within Hilltops Council.

At the 2021 census the population of Reids Flat was 85, unchanged from the 2016 census.

== Location ==
The town is sited on the south bank of the Lachlan River, approximately 40 kilometres (25 mi) southeast of Wyangala, in Hilltops Council, in the South West Slopes region of New South Wales, hidden in the Great Dividing Range. It is graced by grandiorite geomorphology.

The area now known as Reids Flat lies on the traditional lands of Wiradjuri people.

== History ==
There is a rich indigenous dreaming associated with the valley along with a lively bushranger history. Active bushrangers in the area during the early 1860s included Jack Peisley and Frank Gardiner, who often sought refuge at the farm of William Fogg. Caves within the surrounding rocky mountains provided excellent hiding places for the bushrangers – it was claimed that girlfriends and wives would hang white washing on the lines in the valley when the coast was clear.

The village, originally known as Numby, was officially renamed Reid's Flat in 1929.

A history of Reids Flat was published in 1999.

== Wool production ==
Local merino sheep wool production is amongst the finest in the world, with the majority of 15 micron fleece pre-sold to the Italian fashion market. Prices received per bale frequently fetch world record prices ( references) and these wool providers have been farming in the district for over a century.

== Facilities ==
The village – a quiet residential area – does not have any commercial establishments within its boundaries; the nearest shop is located 22 kilometres (14 mi) away, in the town of Bigga. It does, however, possess a public hall, a showground, and a council rubbish dump. The Reids Flat Public School was officially closed on 17 December 2014.

== Gallery ==
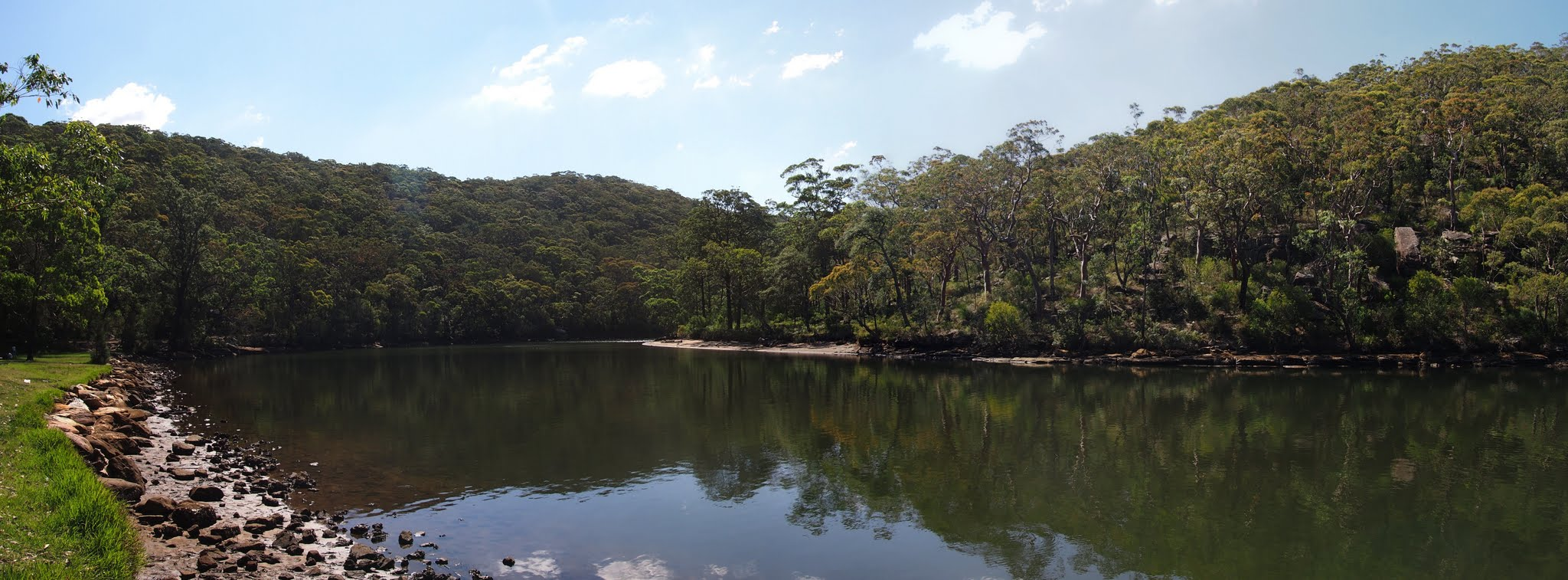
Reids Flat - Panoramio #1

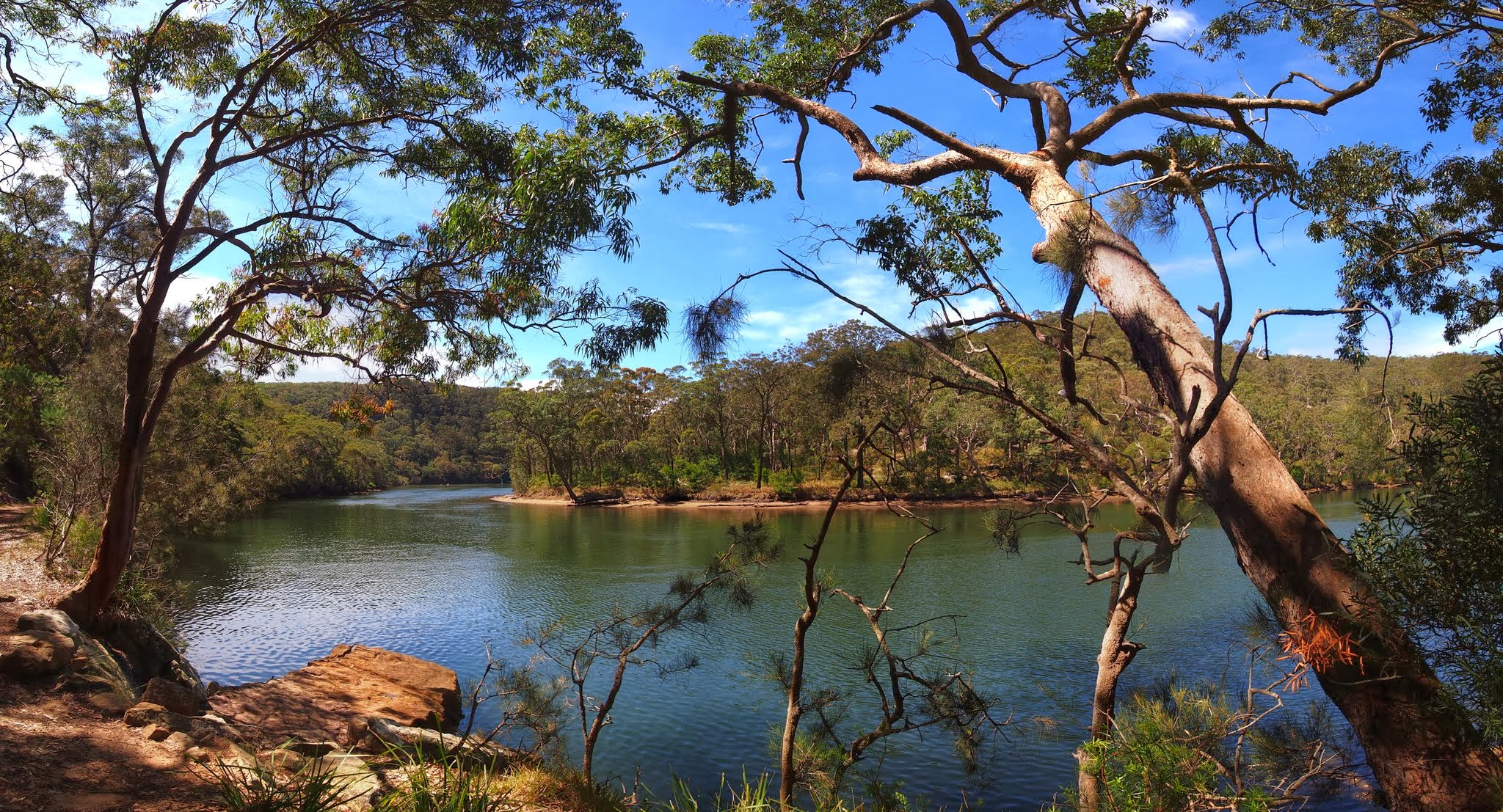
Reids Flat - Panoramio #2
