= Peelwood =

- Town
- Coordinates: 34°6′52″S 149°25′42″E
- Country: Australia
- State: New South Wales
- Region: Southern Tablelands
- LGA: Upper Lachlan Shire
- Location: 85 km (53 mi) N of Goulburn; 103 km (64 mi) S of Bathurst; 46 km (29 mi) N of Crookwell; 285 km (177 mi) W of Sydney

Government
  - State electorate: Goulburn
  - Federal division: Riverina
- Elevation: 629 m (2,064 ft)

Population
  - Total: 45 (SAL 2021)
- Postcode: 2583
- County: Argyle
- Parish: Turrallo
Localities around Peelwood
Tuena	Tuena	Jeremy
Bigga	Peelwood	Fullerton
Crooked Corner	Limerick	Limerick

Peelwood is a locality in the Upper Lachlan Shire, New South Wales, Australia. At the 2016 census, it had a population of 34.

It was the site of the Peelwood Hill Silver Mining and Smelting Co's mine. The mine operated from 1874 to 1895, with one five year interruption. Reprocessing of its mine dumps took place in 1927 and 1947. Rehabilitation of the mine site was carried out between 1994 and 1997. Shafts were filled with mine waste and sediment dams constructed to capture contaminants.

Peelwood had a public school from December 1872 to December 1967. Peelwood has a cemetery.
