= John Peisley (bushranger) =

Australian bushranger

- Born: John Peisley c. 1834; Bathurst, New South Wales, Australia
- Died: 25 April 1862 (aged 27–28); Bathurst, New South Wales, Australia
- Cause of death: Execution by hanging

John Peisley (c. 1834 – 25 April 1862) was an Australian bushranger who is believed to be the first bushranger born in Australia. He was a skilled bushman and horse-rider. While serving time at Cockatoo Island in the late 1850s for horse-stealing, Peisley became acquainted with Frank Gardiner. Peisley was granted a ticket-of-leave in December 1860 and soon afterwards commenced armed robberies in the Goulburn, Abercrombie, Cowra and Lambing Flat districts. He was highly mobile, riding well-bred horses and operating in districts familiar to him. Peisley’s criminal accomplices were often unnamed in newspaper reports, though Gardiner was a known associate. In December 1861 Peisley was involved in a drunken altercation, culminating in the shooting of William Benyon, who died from his wound. After his capture in January 1862 he was tried for Benyon’s murder and hanged at Bathurst in April 1862. Peisley achieved considerable notoriety within a short period and his activities and methods foreshadowed the spate of bushranging in the following years.

== Biography ==
=== Early life and family ===
John Peisley was born in 1834 on the O'Connell Plains, south-east of Bathurst, the son of Thomas Peisley and Elizabeth (née Clayton). His father had arrived in Sydney as a convict in September 1820 aboard the Agamemnon. His mother Elizabeth arrived in Australia as an infant, born in 1812 aboard the ship Minstrel during her mother’s transportation as a convict. Thomas Peisley was living in the Bathurst district when he received his certificate of freedom (free by servitude) in December 1826. After Thomas Peisley and Elizabeth Clayton were married in 1830 they lived on the O’Connell Plains. By the mid-1840s the family was living on a farm at 'Little Forest' near Carcoar. There were seven children in the family, four daughters and three sons, of which John Peisley was the third eldest.

In the period 1846 to early 1848 a series of incidents occurred that resulted in the father of the family, Thomas Peisley, being sentenced to seven years hard labour and incarceration in Darlinghurst Gaol. The consequences of the prolonged absence of their father, husband and provider, and the perceived injustice of the events, had a profound effect on the Peisley family, particularly young Jack who was in his mid-teens at the time. Thomas Peisley's farm at 'Little Forest' was "nearly adjoining" Thomas Icely's pastoral property 'Coombing Park', south-west of Carcoar. Icely was a wealthy landholder and stockbreeder, who had been appointed to the Legislative Council in 1843. He was often absent from his property for extended periods of time, leaving its running in the hands of his overseer and station-hands. In the 1840s wages were low and fencing was expensive, so paddocks were often unfenced and the control of the cattle was left to stockmen. The Peisley farm also ran cattle and there was occasional intermixing of stock from the nearby ‘Coombing Park’, with the distinct possibility that one or more of Icely’s prized bulls would have occasional opportunities to inseminate cows within Peisley’s herd. Straying stock was common in the general district, with animals often ending up in the nearest Government pound.

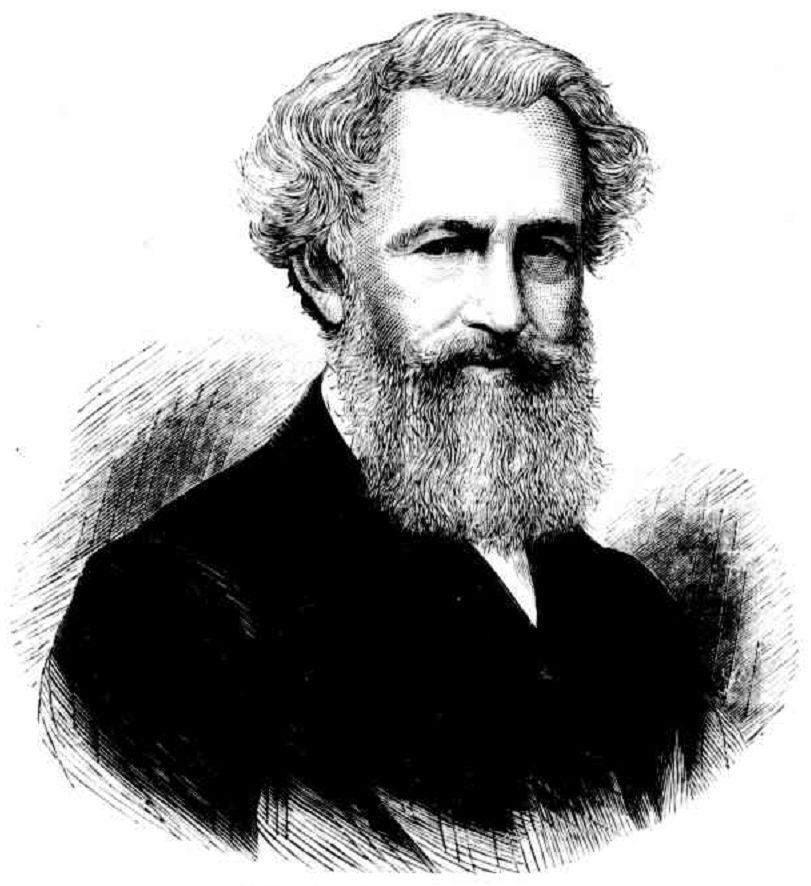
Thomas Icely (1797 - 1874) who had his neighbour, Thomas Peisley, charged and convicted of stealing a highly-valued bull.

It was claimed that Thomas Peisley lost a young bull of the Durham breed from his farm in January 1846, supposed to be unbranded and being saved for a man named Thomas Pye. After searching for the animal, in October 1846 he enquired of the poundkeeper at Carcoar, Charles Spink, who told him he had a young bull answering the description which had been impounded from Icely’s 'Coombing Park' property by the overseer, John Kater. Of the cattle advertised as impounded at Carcoar, the following bull, received at the pound on 21 September 1846, seems most likely to be the animal at issue: "one red bull, small horns, spot of white on forehead, white belly and white hind legs, brand on off rump not legible; damages £5". Peisley paid the poundage charge, returned with the animal to his farm and had branded it with his ‘TP’ over ‘TP’ mark. In about mid-1847 Thomas Peisley was informed that Kater, Icely’s overseer, had sent some strayed cattle to the pound, but had detained one of their number (the young bull in question). When Peisley went to Kater to enquire why he was holding the bull, Kater replied that he was detaining it “because Mr. Icely had lost a bull of the same description, and he suspected this to be the bull lost”. When asked if it had been branded, Kater replied it was branded 'TI' on the hip and shoulder. When Peisley objected that there was “no other brand upon it but his own”, Kater responded “that he did not care, but that he would detain the beast until the arrival of Mr. Iceley”. After Icely’s return from Sydney two months later, Peisley went to ‘Coombing Park’ to claim his property and was apprehended on a warrant Icely had procured from his brother-in-law, William Rothery, a local magistrate. Thomas Peisley was subsequently committed to stand trial for cattle stealing.

At the Bathurst Circuit Court on 23 February 1848 Thomas Peisley was charged with having stolen a young bull from Thomas Icely’s property in mid-1846. Peisley was defended by Arthur Holroyd. During the selection of the jury twenty-one were challenged, “mainly magistrates and wealthy stockholders – to whom the prisoner seemed to express a natural objection”. The newspaper report commented that “we noticed a greater attendance of wealthy stockholders and graziers than we have witnessed for a long time past”. Icely gave evidence that the animal was the progeny of “two valuable animals” imported from England, a Devonshire cow and a Durham bull, and had been branded with 'TI' on the off (right) shoulder and the near (left) rump. Twelve months later the same animal, as claimed by Icely, was found with another brand ('TP' over 'TP'), one of the brands used by Thomas Peisley. In summing up, the judge “occupied the attention of the Jury for nearly two hours and a half” and after an absence of only five minutes the jury returned a verdict of guilty. The next day Peisley was sentenced to seven years hard labour “on the roads”.

In April 1848 a notice was published advising that an auctioneer in York Street, Sydney, had received instructions to sell Thomas Peisley’s cattle, “said to muster about 600 head, now running in the district of Carcoar”, which were forfeited to the Crown after Peisley’s felony conviction. On 18 April 1848 a letter from Elizabeth Peisley, wife of Thomas, was published on page one of the Sydney Morning Herald. Mrs. Peisley described herself as “a lonely and desolate woman, deprived by the interference of the law of the aid and support of a husband” and claimed to set forth in her letter “a plain and simple statement of facts connected with the conviction of my husband”. The letter sets out in detail the sequence of events leading to Peisley’s conviction, paying particular attention to the question of whether Icely’s brand was on the young bull that was the subject of the trial. The point was made: “I should here remark that upwards of two hundred individuals examined the bull during the course of the trial, none of whom could discern Mr. Icely’s or any other brand than my husband’s thereon”. According to the letter, the only witnesses to swear at the trial that Icely’s brand was present were Icely himself, John Kater (Icely’s overseer), William Rothery (Icely’s brother-in-law) and the poundkeeper, Charles Spink. Mark Mills, stockman at ‘Coombing Park’, attested to taking the young bull, which he described as “strange and unbranded”, to the Carcoar pound, and furthermore, that he had “seen Mr. Icely’s bull two days previous to impounding the bull in question”. Two other witnesses, former employees, gave evidence to having seen Icely’s bull “plainly branded”. Elizabeth concludes by imploring that the public make up their minds “whether justice has been done or not”.

In September 1851 the father of the family, Thomas Peisley, was granted a ticket of leave for the Yass district.

=== Horse-stealing ===
In February 1852 John Peisley was indicted on two charges of horse-stealing carried out the previous year when he was aged seventeen. On Thursday 19 February 1852, at the Bathurst Assizes, he was charged with stealing a horse belonging to Thomas McKell of Grubbingbong, 14 miles from Carcoar, for which he pleaded not guilty. The horse was found to be missing in March 1851 and had been sold through an auctioneer in Goulburn. Peisley’s solicitor "made a very able defence for the prisoner" by showing there was "considerable doubt as to whether the prisoner at the bar was the man who commissioned" the auctioneer to sell the horse. The jury were divided and ended up being locked up for the night, but next morning they told the judge they could not come to a decision and were unlikely to do so. Nevertheless, Peisley was remanded in custody to face a further charge, which he did later that day.

On the second charge Peisley was indicted for stealing two horses in April 1851 from Thomas Weavers’ ‘Mount Macquarie’ station near Carcoar, for which he also pleaded not guilty. Several witnesses for the prosecution, in describing the brands on the horses, gave conflicting accounts and in the end the jury acquitted the prisoner of the charge “without leaving the box”. After that Peisley was again brought forward, and discharged “upon his own recognizances” to appear when called upon, to answer the charge for which the jury were unable to make a decision about his guilt or innocence.

In December 1852 a pastoralist named Patrick Kurley near Bigga found that two of his horses were missing from his paddock. The horses were both black and branded ‘JC’. Kurley later testified he had noticed John Peisley and a man named Cooke “about the neighbourhood”. Several weeks later Peisley and Cooke approached an auctioneer in Bathurst to arrange the sale of the two horses. The mail contractor, Joseph Matthews, was approached and after some negotiations Matthews purchased the horses from Peisley and Cooke. Soon afterwards Kurley found that his horses were in the possession of Matthews (who purchased them again from Kurley for £20).

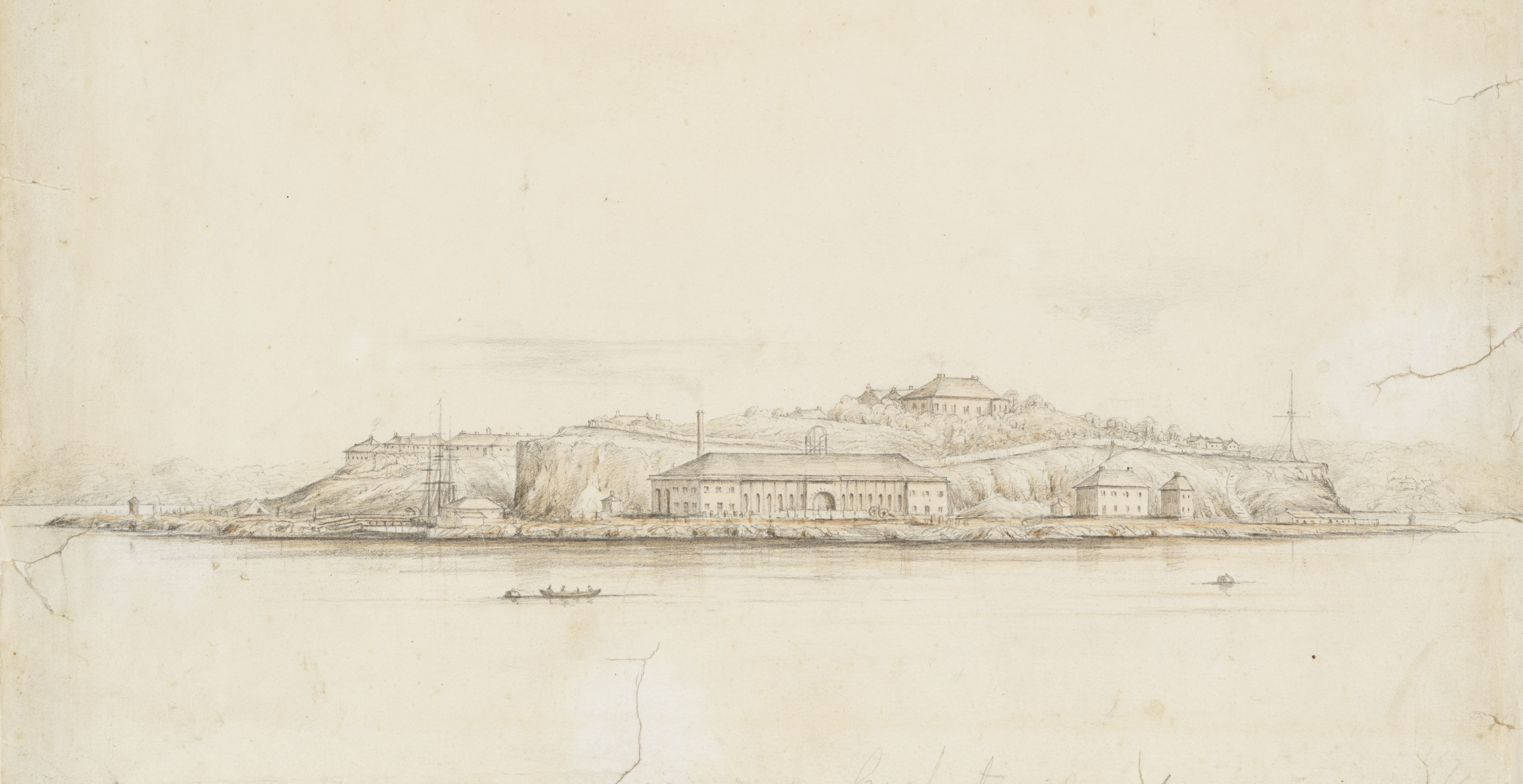
The Cockatoo Island prison, Sydney Harbour, where John Peisley and Frank Gardiner served time in the late 1850s.

Peisley was eventually apprehended by the police in mid-1854 at the house of a man named Richards on the Abercrombie River. On Thursday 13 July 1854, at the Bathurst Quarter Sessions, Peisley was indicted for stealing Patrick Kurley's two horses in December 1852. After hearing the evidence the jury retired for only a short time, and returned with a verdict of guilty. Peisley was sentenced to five years hard labour, to be incarcerated on Cockatoo Island. On the night of 30 July 1854 while en route from Bathurst to Sydney, a group of prisoners, including Peisley, were housed in a weatherboard lock-up at Hartley. During the night Peisley and four other prisoners escaped from the lock-up. Each of the escapees had their hair cut short and were wearing prison clothing. A £5 reward was offered for their apprehension. Peisley was probably apprehended within a short period of time; in September 1855 it was recorded that he had received a further sentence of one month "in Parramatta Gaol at the expiration of his former sentence" for the crime of "escape from custody". Peisley was sent from Parramatta Gaol to Cockatoo Island in February 1855.

While he was incarcerated at Cockatoo Island Peisley met another prisoner called Frank Clarke, alias Frank Christie, known as ‘Darkie’. In later years Clarke would be achieve considerable notoriety as the bushranger Frank Gardiner, but in the mid- to late-1850s he was serving time at Cockatoo Island for horse and cattle stealing. Clarke had been convicted at Goulburn in March 1854 on two cases of horse-stealing and sentenced to seven years’ hard labour on the roads. While in prison Clarke “was exceedingly reserved and distant in his manner” and Peisley was “the only prisoner on the island who appeared to be familiar with him”.

Peisley was discharged in 23 April 1857 from Parramatta Gaol. In April 1857 Peisley, described as “a ticket-of-leave holder for the District of Goulburn”, was apprehended at Goulburn with five horses in his possession which were “supposed to have been stolen”. On 10 September 1857 Peisley was re-admitted to Darlinghurst Gaol.

=== Bushranging ===
In December 1860 Jack Peisley was granted a ticket-of-leave for the Scone district, conditional on him remaining in the district. The description of Peisley printed in the Police Gazette was as follows: “26 years of age, 5 feet 8½ inches high, pale complexion, flaxen hair, bluish grey eyes, long featured, nose a little pockmarked with scar on bridge, … top of middle finger of left hand disfigured, … arms and legs hairy”. Soon after Peisley was released on a ticket-of-leave he left the Scone district, by which action he was deemed to be illegally at large. He was reputed to have embarked on a series of robberies on the roads in the Goulburn, Abercrombie, Cowra and Lambing Flat districts, the victims being mainly travellers. Although the identity of the perpetrator was often not established, Peisley’s name was frequently invoked, to such an extent that he achieved considerable notoriety in a short space of time. Robberies may have been carried out by one man or at other times, by three or four. The bushrangers were well mounted, and managed to evade the police by constantly moving from place to place. By early March 1861 local newspapers had begun to use the term “notorious” to describe Peisley.

In mid-February 1861 Sergeant Middleton and Trooper Hosie of the Mounted Patrol, stationed at Tuena in the Abercrombie district, received word that Stapleton, a publican at Trunkey Creek, had been robbed, as had some Chinese miners on the Abercrombie River. The policemen had earlier encountered two men, who now came under suspicion. In endeavouring to find the men, they took possession of three horses and swags which the men had left. They were taken to Carcoar where goods stolen from a hawker were found wrapped in the swags. Furthermore, one of the horses was found to be “the one lately ridden by the notorious Peisley, who is still at large to the great terror of settlers and travellers”. In early March Middleton and Hosie again came across the two men and took them into custody. The correspondent from Tuena to the Goulburn Herald commented that "the district around is… in a state of more insecurity, than at any previous period for some time past, bare-faced robberies, and sticking up, seem to be the rule and not the exception"; Jack Peisley "in concert with other villains been robbing right and left".

On Saturday 23 March 1861, Richard Cox, an officer of the Bank of New South Wales, while travelling from Louisa Creek to Tambaroora (north of Hill End), was fired upon by two armed men and robbed of his horse, together with £565 in £5 and £1 notes as well as silver and gold coins. The bushrangers were supposed to be John Peisley and William Campbell (alias McKenzie, alias Scotchy Hand, alias Big Mouthed Scotchy). The Government offered a reward of £50 for information leading to the apprehension of the offenders. In early April 1861 it was notified that Peisley’s tickets-of-leave had been withdrawn by the Police Magistrate at Scone because of the convict’s absence from the district.

In mid-July 1861 Troopers Evans and McBride captured John Cosgrove, whose name had been “mentioned freely for some time in connexion with the notorious Peisley and there can be no doubt that they are mixed up in some way or another”. Cosgrove was found “lying half drunk before the fire” at the house of a man called Clayton at Long Range near Rockley (west of Oberon).

=== Gardiner's capture and escape ===
Peisley’s companion while on Cockatoo Island, Frank Clarke, had been granted a ticket-of-leave in December 1859, conditional on him staying in the Carcoar district. Calling himself Frank Jones he opened a butcher shop at Spring Creek, Lambing Flat, but was arrested in May 1861 on a cattle-stealing charge and committed for trial but allowed bail. He then absconded, after which it was discovered he was a prisoner absent from his district.

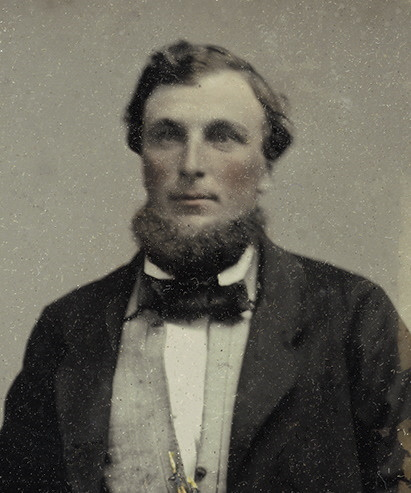
Sergeant John Middleton of the Western Road Patrol, photographed in 1858.

Mid-morning on Tuesday 16 July 1861, Sergeant John Middleton and Constable William Hosie, who were stationed at Tuena, arrived at William Fogg’s hut near Bigga in the upper Lachlan River district, having received intelligence that Fogg was harbouring one or more bushrangers. As they approached the hut Mrs. Fogg appeared and, seeing the policemen, “threw up her arms in alarm”. Middleton entered the hut, where Frank Gardiner was hiding in an inner room behind a calico screen. As the sergeant approached the screen Gardiner warned “I’ll blow out the brains of the first man that comes in here”. Disregarding the warning Middleton lifted the cloth and the two men fired at each other at close range. Middleton, with a single-shot pistol, reloaded but his pistol then mis-fired. Gardiner, with a five- or six-shot revolver, repeatedly fired at the policeman who received a bullet in the mouth, another that went through his left hand and lodged in his thigh and yet another hit the inside of his left knee. He staggered outside and ordered Constable Hosie to look for a way to enter the house at the rear. This was not possible so Hosie then entered the hut and fired at Gardiner, “cutting him across the mouth”; the bushranger returned fire, the bullet flattened against Hosie’s temple, which felled him. Gardiner, now out of ammunition, then attacked Middleton with the butt-end of his gun. Suddenly, to Middleton’s “utter astonishment and joy”, Hosie recovered from being stunned by the bullet and seized Gardiner from behind. After a desperate struggle, during which Middleton joined in by repeatedly striking Gardiner’s head with the end of his whip, Hosie managed to take possession of Gardiner’s revolver and the bushranger was handcuffed. During the fight Fogg had repeatedly intervened, staying Middleton’s hand and imploring him “not to kill the man”. With Gardiner restrained Middleton demanded a horse from Fogg to transport the prisoner to Bigga, but Fogg either refused or "said there were none", so the sergeant proceeded to Bigga alone to seek assistance, leaving Hosie to guard the prisoner. Weak and faint from loss of blood, and in severe pain, Middleton lost himself in the bush and took nearly four hours to reach Bigga.

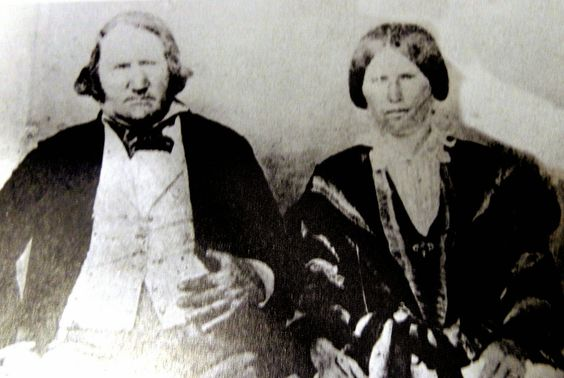
William Fogg and his wife Mary.

What happened after Sergeant Middleton left for Bigga was the subject of much subsequent speculation and rumour:

- Hosie's version: After several hours had elapsed, and Gardiner had made an escape attempt, fearing Middleton had died of his wounds Hosie asked Fogg to assist him to get Gardiner to Bigga. On this occasion Fogg was more compliant; finding horses they set off, Fogg leading Gardiner’s horse and Hosie riding behind. After a couple of miles on the road "Peisley and another mounted man suddenly came up out of the bush", covering Hosie with their revolvers. The two armed men grabbed the bridle of Gardiner’s horse "and rode off with him, followed by Fogg". By his account, Hosie was "determined not to let them go without another shot" and fired at Gardiner as he departed, claiming he saw him fall forward in the saddle. Peisley then returned fire at the trooper; in Hosie's words: "and the bullet whizzed by my head". Peisley was about to fire again when Fogg said to him: "Don’t kill him, or you will get me in for it". Hosie then made his way to Bigga, where he found Sergeant Middleton, and the policemen's wounds were attended to.
- Peisley's version: Fogg offered Trooper Hosie a bribe of £50 if he would let Gardiner go free. Peisley was very specific, claiming on the scaffold that Hosie's bribe included a cheque for £2 10s, so the total he received was £50 10s. Peisley denied he had rescued Gardiner from police custody in a letter written to a Bathurst newspaper in early September 1861 and again on the scaffold prior to his death by hanging. The suspicion of corruption thus became associated with the trooper and Hosie was eventually dismissed from the police force “amid the execrations of the majority of the people of the Western districts”.
- Gardiner's version: John Vane, who rode with Ben Hall’s gang in mid-1863, was serving time at Darlinghurst Gaol when he met Gardiner, describing him as his “yard mate for some time”. Vane claimed that, during their time together, Gardiner described what had happened that day at Fogg’s house. Gardiner recounted that after Middleton had left for Bigga, Hosie fainted from his wound and subsequent exertions, giving the bushranger the upper hand. As the policeman lay helpless on the floor, Gardiner told him "if he moved he would kill him". Hosie replied that "he had had enough of it and that Gardiner could go free if he liked". Before leaving Gardiner claimed to have "borrowed some money – he didn’t say how much – and made Hosie a present". Gardiner related that while the police were searching the bush for him, he was hiding in a cave "near Teasdale" (between Newbridge and Trunkey Creek) where he remained until his wounds were healed.

On 23 July the colonial government offered a reward of £50 for information leading to the apprehension and conviction of the bushrangers Gardiner and Peisley, “and three others whose names are unknown”, who were involved in the “affray” with Sergeant Middleton and Trooper Hosie a week earlier. On 12 August the reward offer was amended to £100 for information leading to the apprehension and conviction of John Peisley, and a further £50 for each of the four other bushrangers. By early January 1862 the rewards offered had been amended once again. On 9 January a notification was published giving full descriptions of both Gardiner and Peisley, and a less detailed description of a third man. A reward of £20 was offered for Gardiner’s apprehension and £50 for Peisley’s. A further £100 was put forward for information leading to the apprehension and conviction of Peisley and £50 for the apprehension and conviction each of Gardiner and the other man. The description of Jack Peisley contained further details not previously revealed: “stout and well made, fresh complexion, very small light whiskers, quite bald on top of head and forehead, recent marks on face, and a mark from a blow of a spade on top of head; puffed and dissipated looking from hard drinking; invariably wears fashionable Napoleon boots, dark cloth breeches, dark vest buttoned up the front, large Albert gold guard, cabbagetree hat, and dark coat; sometimes wears a dark wig, and always carries a brace of revolvers”. It was further disclosed that Peisley was in Sydney “some weeks ago, in company, it is supposed, with Zahn, alias Herring, of the Abercrombie”. Zahn (alias Charles Herring) was an associate of long-standing of Gardiner's, from when the two of them succeeded in escaping from Pentridge Prison in March 1851. Zahn was probably an accomplice to at least some of Peisley’s armed robberies during the latter half of 1861. An article in the Bathurst Times after Peisley’s capture in January 1862 lamented that many persons in the Abercrombie and Lachlan districts had harboured, or at least tolerated, Peisley and his criminal activities. The article includes the following: “It is evident that they have harboured Peisley and his mate Zahn; and I only trust some of them may come to trouble for doing so”.

=== 'The notorious Peisley' ===
Mid-afternoon on Sunday 28 July 1861, two men name Charles Blatner and George Jones were held up by three men, masked and armed with revolvers, on the road to Goulburn, near Paddy’s River. The taller of three (possibly Peisley) ordered the men to “stand and strip”, forcing the travellers to remove their clothing from which the bushrangers gathered £12 in notes, £5 in gold and a 15 shillings in silver. As they departed the robbers returned the silver coins to the men.

On 2 August a large group of Chinese were stopped and robbed about two miles from Bigga on the road to the Fish River by four armed men, one of whom was identified as Jack Peisley. The bushrangers stole £124 as well as a horse, saddle and bridle and a swag containing blankets and coats.

On 4 September 1861 Peisley wrote from the Fish River district to the editor of the Bathurst Free Press and Mining Journal (published in mid-September). The letter-writer was clearly vexed at being held in disrepute and claimed to have been mis-represented. Peisley asserts that “never, in no instance, did I ever use violence, nor did I ever use rudeness to any of the fair sex, and I must certainly be the Invisible Prince to commit one-tenth of what is laid to my charge”. In reference to the allegation that it was he who had rescued Gardiner from police custody, Peisley enigmatically declared that he "will never be tried" for that act, "in the light in which it is represented", adding "nor did I ever fire at Trooper Hosie". The bushranger proclaimed, “I love my native hills, I love freedom and detest cruelty to man or beast”, signing off, "Your much harassed Writer".

On the morning of 14 September 1861 Mr. O’Sullivan, on his way from Marengo to Cowra, was bailed up by armed men, one of whom was “supposed to have been the notorious Peisley”. O’Sullivan was taken into the bush and robbed.

Early on the morning of 12 October 1861 a mail coach was bailed up by Jack Peisley, three miles from Cowra on the road to Carcoar. The coach, driven by John Taylor, had eight passengers, five men and three women. The bushranger was well-mounted and had a piece of crêpe covering his face; he was described as being “remarkably cool and civil, and did not interfere with the females”. Peisley robbed the male passengers of a total of £14 9s. and a gold ring. He cut open the mail-bags with a knife, borrowed from one of the passengers, and opened a selection of letters he considered most likely to contain cash. Before leaving, Peisley returned the silver portion of the passengers’ money.

On Wednesday evening, 30 October 1861, two masked and armed men, the taller of whom was later identified as Peisley, entered the house of James Eldridge at Cook’s Vale, on the road from Goulburn to Tuena, demanding money. They tied his hands behind him and strapped his legs, saying to him “he was not the first man they had killed, and it was only a hanging matter after all”. They took £22 and other articles from Eldridge, after which they proceeded to Mr. Laverty’s house where they stole £45 and some of Laverty’s wife’s jewellery. The two bushrangers next arrived at Thomas Vardy’s Limerick Races Inn, where they demanded money. After Vardy refused they threatened violence and to burn some deeds they had found. A total of £21 was eventually given up to the men, after which they “proceeded coolly to divide the result of the night’s plunder on the counter”. The smaller of the two bushrangers then left, and the taller man remained at the public-house for a further two hours, during which Peisley disclosed his identity to Vardy.

=== The shooting of Benyon ===
On 27 December 1861 Jack Peisley looked up an old acquaintance, James Wilson, who operated a store on the Abercrombie River. The pair went to McGuinness’ public-house at Bigga, where they spent the evening drinking. The next morning Peisley and Wilson, both of them drunk, went to William Benyon’s farm about a mile from Bigga where they began drinking with Benyon and his brother Stephen. At length William Benyon and Peisley began to quarrel and went outside to fight. Benyon found “he was getting the worst of it” and called out to his brother to assist him, at which Stephen Benyon came and struck Peisley over the head with a spade, knocking him to the ground, at which the brothers “began to knock him about”. They left him bushranger lying on the ground. When he recovered, Peisley made his way to Bigga to buy a new shirt, as the one he had on was torn and bloodied. He then returned to the farm where he found William Benyon and several others reaping in a paddock. When he saw his adversary approaching, Benyon went to meet him, at which Peisley drew his revolver and shot the settler in the throat, with the ball lodging in his spine. Stephen Benyon then came from the house armed with a gun, but as he drew near Peisley knocked the gun aside and shot him in the arm. Peisley bailed up all those present, waiting to see if Benyon would die, but eventually he departed. Benyon lingered for seven days before he died.

=== Pursuit and capture ===
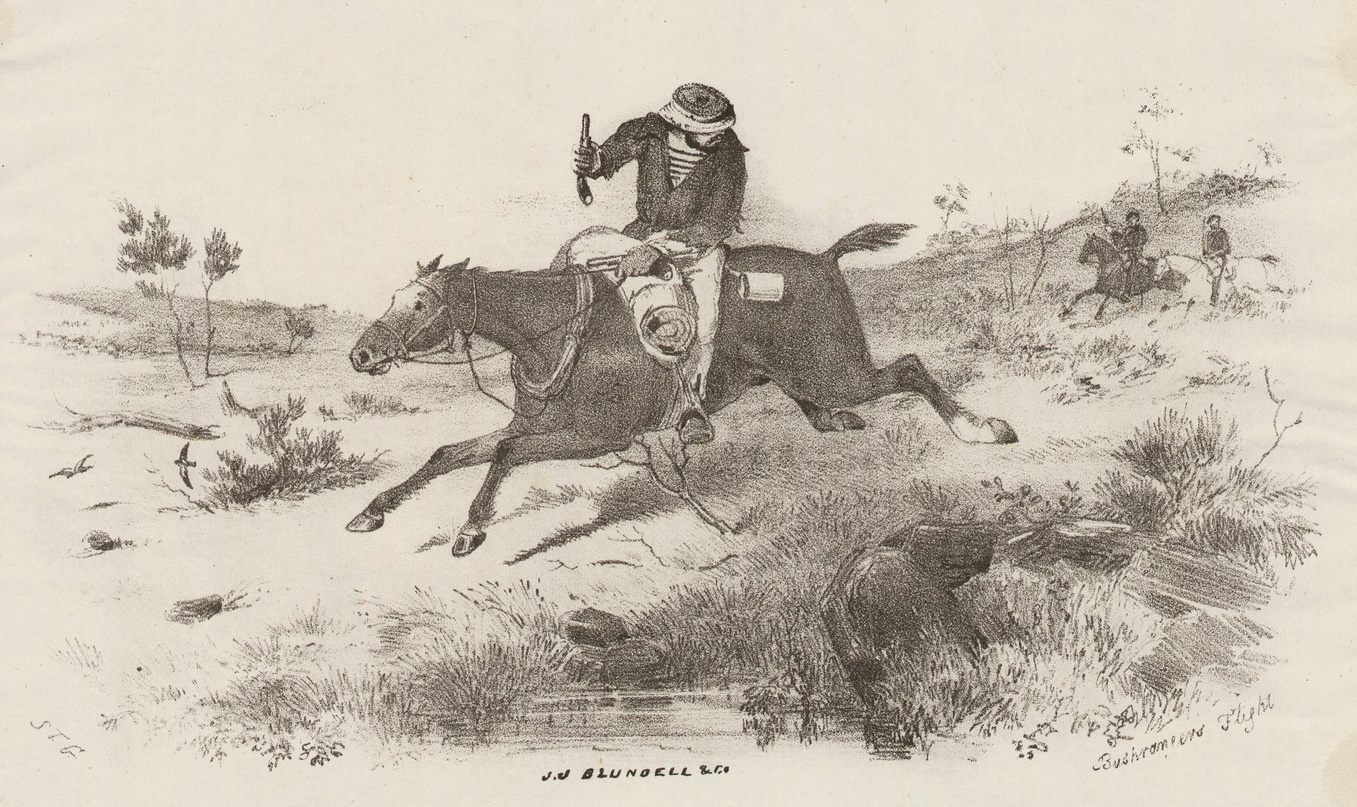
’Bushranger’s Flight’ by S. T. Gill (1956).

On Wednesday 15 January 1862 constables Morris, Murphy and Simpson, who had been “scouring the Abercrombie country in search of Peisley” were heading towards Bigga when the bushranger met them, mounted on a well-bred horse. Peisley “told them at once he was the man they were looking for”. After an exchange of words between the outlaw and the troopers, Peisley suddenly turned his horse’s head, dug in his spurs in and galloped away. Several shots were fired in his wake, one of which passed between the reins and the horse’s neck, prompting Peisley to call back, “that was a good one” as he rode away. The troopers gave chase but Peisley’s superior mount enabled him to easily escape.

In January 1862 it was reported that Jack Peisley was still at large, “and is like to remain so for some time, as neither constables nor troopers seem able to apprehend him, although he is seen daily not many miles from the scene of the murder”. On 25 January “several constables gave chase to him but did not succeed in taking him”.

On 26 January Peisley left the districts with which he was most familiar. Heading south from Lambing Flat and leading a pack-horse, he crossed the Murrumbidgee River between Wagga Wagga and Gundagai and arrived at McKenzie’s inn at Mundarlo. He remained there while both horses were shod, and “after liberally treating every one about the place, left without the slightest suspicion being excited”.

From Mundarlo Peisley continued heading south. About two miles from Tarcutta, on Wednesday, 29 January 1862, he met Corporal John Carroll of the Southern Gold Escort on the road and had a brief conversation. After they parted Carroll, suspecting “all was not right”, examined the description of Peisley in his copy of the Police Gazette and, realising the rider he had met fitted the description, started in pursuit. On coming up to him Carroll presented his revolver and said, “I believe you are Peisley, the bushranger”. After some evasive comments Peisley suddenly let his pack-horse go and started off at full gallop for the distant hills. Carroll set off in pursuit, but the bushranger had a superior horse; as he began to lose ground the policeman discharged his single-shot pistol, without effect, but continued the chase. The bushranger then stopped and turned and levelled his Colt revolver at his pursuer, “threatening to shoot him if he advanced”. Carroll retired from the action and returned to Tarcutta for assistance, taking charge of Peisley’s discarded pack-horse and swag.

It was believed Peisley was making his way to Victoria, but rather than heading south towards the border he turned back through the ranges to Mundarlo, arriving there in the early afternoon. Arriving again at McKenzie’s Inn Peisley claimed he was in search of a lost pocket-book and that he had left his pack-horse tied up in the bush. He stayed at the public-house, drinking with the other clientele and sheltering from a heavy thunderstorm. McKenzie the publican observed that Peisley was attempting to conceal a pistol in his waistband. McKenzie sought the assistance of Beveridge, the superintendent of nearby ‘Wantabadgery’ station, who observed Peisley and became convinced “that some villainy was a-foot”. Beveridge decided to ride to Tarcutta to alert the police, while McKenzie kept “a sharp look-out in the meantime”. At Tarcutta Beveridge found the police were out searching for Peisley, so he took a pair of handcuffs and returned to Mundarlo, and planned with McKenzie how next to proceed. While Peisley “was taking his tea” McKenzie, Beveridge and McKenzie's groom overpowered Peisley and secured him by a chain to a heavy table. During the night while he was briefly unguarded, Peisley jumped up, overturned the table and made frantic efforts to wrench the leg off the table, which proved to be too strong. The next day McKenzie, “not relishing the company of his guest any longer”, escorted the prisoner on the mail-cart to Gundagai with the assistance of Beveridge and Mr. Stephen of Tarcutta. Peisley was handed over to the police and placed in the Gundagai lock-up. The next day he was examined by the Police Magistrate and remanded to Carcoar.

=== Trial and execution ===
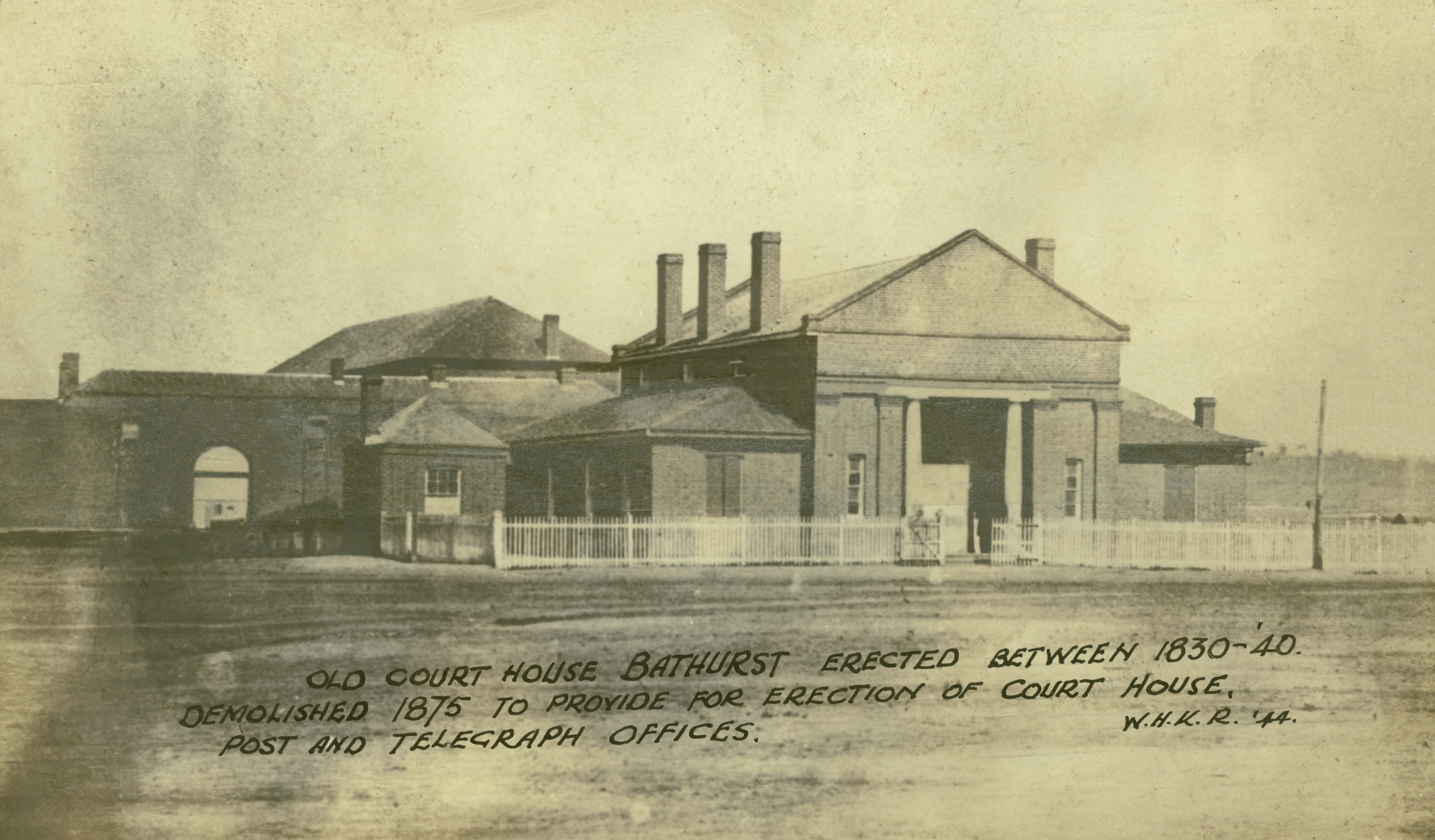
Bathurst Court House (demolished in 1875).

At the Carcoar Court House, on Wednesday 12 February 1862, Jack Peisley was brought before the Bench of Magistrates, charged with the wilful murder of Thomas Benyon at Bigga. The courtroom was "more crowded than it has been for many years". Evidence was given by witnesses to the events leading to Benyon’s shooting, at the conclusion of which the prisoner fully committed for trial. The next morning Peisley was transferred to Bathurst Gaol under a strong escort.

The Police Magistrate at Carcoar, Owen Beardmore, had persistent doubts about Hosie’s story regarding Peisley's involvement in Gardiner's escape in July 1861. Rumours that Hosie had been bribed prompted him to make enquiries and even took a statement from Peisley when he was in custody. Beardmore wrote to the authorities in Sydney to request a pardon for Peisley, which was refused. Another source claims that "almost superhuman efforts were made to save [Peisley’s] life; but they failed". Beardmore resigned soon afterwards and had left the district by mid-year 1862.

On Thursday 13 March 1862, at the Bathurst Assizes, John Peisley was indicted on the charge of William Benyon's murder, to which he pleaded not guilty. The court was "crowded to excess during the whole of the trial". Peisley was tried before Justice Wise. After the evidence was given the judge summed up the case "at considerable length". The jury retired for about ten minutes and then returned to the court with a verdict of guilty. Justice Wise then pronounced a sentence of death upon the prisoner. As he was led from the court one of Peisley’s friends called out "Well Johnny, what is it?", to which the bushranger replied, "Oh, it’s a swinger".

John Peisley was hanged on the morning of 25 April 1862, within the Bathurst Gaol precincts before about fifty inhabitants of the township. It was said that the condemned man "manifested the coolness and determination of a man of the strongest nerve". An Aboriginal man, Jackey Bullfrog (alias Flash Jack), was hanged alongside Peisley for the murder of William Clarke in December 1861 at Condobolin. After Peisley had ascended the scaffold, he was given an opportunity to speak. He recounted at length the events leading to his fight with Benyon, as well as more general comments about his bushranging career, claiming that "he looked upon himself as the most honorable man that ever took [to] the bush under arms". He asserted as false a number of accusations made against him, including that it was he who had freed Gardiner from police custody. He concluded by hoping “God would forgive all his enemies”, maintaining that “he forgave them freely and fully”. His final words were "Good bye gentlemen, and God bless you". The ropes were then adjusted and white caps drawn over the heads of the two men; at a signal from the Acting-Sheriff the drop was released. For John Peisley death came quickly, "but the poor blackfellow was for several minutes frightfully convulsed".
