= Georgiana County =

Georgiana New South Wales
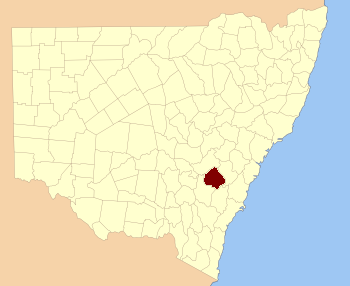
- Location in New South Wales
Lands administrative divisions around Georgiana:
Bathurst	Bathurst	Westmoreland
King	Georgiana	Westmoreland
King	Argyle	Argyle

Georgiana County was one of the original Nineteen Counties in New South Wales and is now one of the 141 cadastral divisions of New South Wales. It lies in the area about halfway between Bathurst and Goulburn. The Lachlan River is the western boundary, with the Crookwell River the southern boundary. It includes Bigga, and the area surrounding the Abercrombie River. It was part of the Electoral district of King and Georgiana from 1856 to 1859.

Georgiana County was named in honour of Georgiana Cavendish, Duchess of Devonshire (1757–1806).

== Parishes within this county ==
A full list of parishes found within this county; their current LGA and mapping coordinates to the approximate centre of each location is as follows:

Parish	LGA	Coordinates
Abercrombie	Bathurst Regional Council	33°54′54″S 149°15′04″E
Ballyroe	Oberon Shire	34°01′54″S 149°32′04″E
Beemarang	Oberon Shire	33°54′54″S 149°44′04″E
Belmore	Upper Lachlan Shire	34°20′54″S 149°28′04″E
Bigga	Upper Lachlan Shire	34°02′54″S 149°09′04″E
Binda	Upper Lachlan Shire	34°20′54″S 149°24′04″E
Bingham	Upper Lachlan Shire	34°03′54″S 149°30′04″E
Blackman	Upper Lachlan Shire	34°07′54″S 149°16′34″E
Bolong	Upper Lachlan Shire	34°14′24″S 149°35′04″E
Bombah	Bathurst Regional Council	33°55′54″S 149°20′04″E
Bubalahla	Upper Lachlan Shire	34°12′54″S 149°48′04″E
Bucumba	Oberon Shire	33°53′54″S 149°28′04″E
Bummaroo	Oberon Shire	34°08′54″S 149°42′04″E
Burraga	Oberon Shire	33°53′54″S 149°34′04″E
Burridgee	Upper Lachlan Shire	34°07′54″S 149°32′04″E
Carrawa	Bathurst Regional Council	33°43′54″S 149°23′04″E
Copperhannia	Bathurst Regional Council	33°50′54″S 149°15′04″E
Cuddyong	Upper Lachlan Shire	34°13′54″S 149°25′04″E
Finley	Oberon Shire	34°03′54″S 149°42′04″E
Garrynian	Oberon Shire	33°58′54″S 149°45′04″E
Gillindich	Upper Lachlan Shire	34°11′24″S 149°19′34″E
Gilmandyke	Oberon Shire	33°49′54″S 149°30′04″E
Glengarry	Upper Lachlan Shire	34°08′54″S 149°04′04″E
Grabine	Upper Lachlan Shire	33°55′54″S 149°05′34″E
Groveland	Bathurst Regional Council	33°48′54″S 149°26′04″E
Gurnang	Oberon Shire	34°00′54″S 149°49′04″E
Hillas	Upper Lachlan Shire	34°18′54″S 149°40′04″E
Isabella	Oberon Shire	33°57′54″S 149°41′04″E
Jeremy	Oberon Shire	33°59′54″S 149°35′04″E
Jerrong	Oberon Shire	34°08′54″S 149°48′04″E
Julong	Upper Lachlan Shire	34°16′54″S 149°17′04″E
Kangaloolah	Upper Lachlan Shire	34°07′54″S 149°23′04″E
Kempfield	Bathurst Regional Council	33°45′54″S 149°17′04″E
Keverstone	Upper Lachlan Shire	34°07′54″S 149°09′04″E
Kiamma	Upper Lachlan Shire	34°25′54″S 149°30′04″E
Laggan	Upper Lachlan Shire	34°20′54″S 149°35′04″E
Leighwood	Upper Lachlan Shire	34°11′54″S 149°38′04″E
Markdale	Upper Lachlan Shire	34°12′54″S 149°14′04″E
Meglo	Upper Lachlan Shire	34°03′54″S 149°16′04″E
Mount Lawson	Oberon Shire	33°50′54″S 149°34′04″E
Mulgowrie	Upper Lachlan Shire	34°14′54″S 149°09′04″E
Mulgunnia	Bathurst Regional Council	33°48′54″S 149°21′04″E
Retreat	Oberon Shire	34°03′54″S 149°37′04″E
Rockley	Oberon Shire	33°42′54″S 149°30′04″E
Sherwood	Upper Lachlan Shire	34°13′54″S 149°34′04″E
Stoke	Bathurst Regional Council	33°54′54″S 149°10′04″E
Thalaba	Upper Lachlan Shire	34°16′54″S 149°30′04″E
Thompson	Upper Lachlan Shire	33°59′54″S 149°30′04″E
Tuena	Upper Lachlan Shire	34°01′54″S 149°23′04″E
Tyrl Tyrl	Upper Lachlan Shire	34°26′54″S 149°38′04″E
Walbrook	Oberon Shire	30°51′54″S 149°38′04″E
Wangalo	Upper Lachlan Shire	34°08′54″S 149°27′04″E
Werong	Oberon Shire	34°08′54″S 149°54′04″E
Wiarborough	Upper Lachlan Shire	34°12′54″S 149°53′04″E
Wowagin	Upper Lachlan Shire	34°19′54″S 149°46′04″E
Wyndham	Oberon Shire	34°04′54″S 149°44′34″E
Yalbraith	Upper Lachlan Shire	34°14′54″S 149°50′04″E
Yarraman	Upper Lachlan Shire	33°55′54″S 149°16′04″E
Yewrangara	Upper Lachlan Shire	34°02′54″S 149°04′04″E
