= Crookwell River =

Crookwell
- Crookwell River at Crookwell, September 2020

- Location of the Crookwell River mouth in New South Wales
- Etymology: Originally "Crook-ell"; derived from Crookhall, Co. Durham.

Location
- Country: Australia
- State: New South Wales
- Region: South Eastern Highlands (IBRA), Southern Tablelands, South West Slopes
- LGAs: Upper Lachlan, Boorowa
- Town: Crookwell

Physical characteristics
- Source: Great Dividing Range
  - location: south of Crookwell
  - coordinates: 34°46′58″S 149°32′7″E
  - elevation: 619 m (2,031 ft)
- Mouth: Lachlan River
  - location: north–west of Binda and east of Frogmore
  - coordinates: 34°16′39″S 149°7′53″E
  - elevation: 430 m (1,410 ft)
- Length: 78 km (48 mi)

Basin features
- River system: Murray–Darling basin
- Tributaries
  - left: Wheeo Creek
  - right: Kiamma Creek

The Crookwell River is a perennial river that is part of the Lachlan catchment within the Murray–Darling basin, located in the Southern Tablelands and South West Slopes regions of New South Wales, Australia.

Sourced by runoff from the western slopes of the Great Dividing Range, the river rises south of Crookwell and flows generally northwest by west, joined by one minor tributary, before reaching its confluence with the Lachlan River northwest of Binda and east of Frogmore. The river descends 461 metres (1,512 ft) over its 78-kilometre (48 mi) course.

== Etymology ==
The river was originally named "Crook-ell" by William Stephenson, who originated from Crookhall, Durham, England.

== Native fish fauna ==
Large Murray cod and endangered Macquarie perch, amongst other native fish, once abounded in the Crookwell, virtually to the base of Crookwell township:

170 lb COD FISH. Big Fellows Abounded in Crookwell River Sixty Years Ago.

"According to Mr. E. C. Bray there's nothing sensational about the 24 & 1/2 lb. [11.1 kg] cod caught in the Abercrombie [River] below the Tuena bridge, as reported in our last issue. Going back a brief space of time—a matter of sixty years—according to Mr. Bray, the Crookwell River abounded with cod. But they were real fish—lots of them weighing as much as 70 lbs [31.8 kg].

Asked for an explanation of their disappearance from this stream Mr. Bray said the practise of sheep washing in the river was responsible for killing them.

He says that it was a simple matter to throw a line into the stream below James's Park [road fork], baited with a grasshopper, and haul out a big fellow.

He has seen huge specimens, he says, hauled out of the [Lachlan] river below Mr. William Cummings' old residence at Reid's Flat, some weighing as much as 170 lbs [77 kg].

Elsewhere in to-day's issue we report the capture of a 35-pounder [15.9 kilogramer], which our correspondent describes as a "fisherman's delight." The Abercrombie "monster" was styled a "fisherman's dream".

Now, has anybody landed a really big fish lately?"

— Crookwell Gazette

== See also ==
- List of rivers of Australia § New South Wales
- Rivers of New South Wales
