= Bigga, New South Wales =

Bigga
- Town
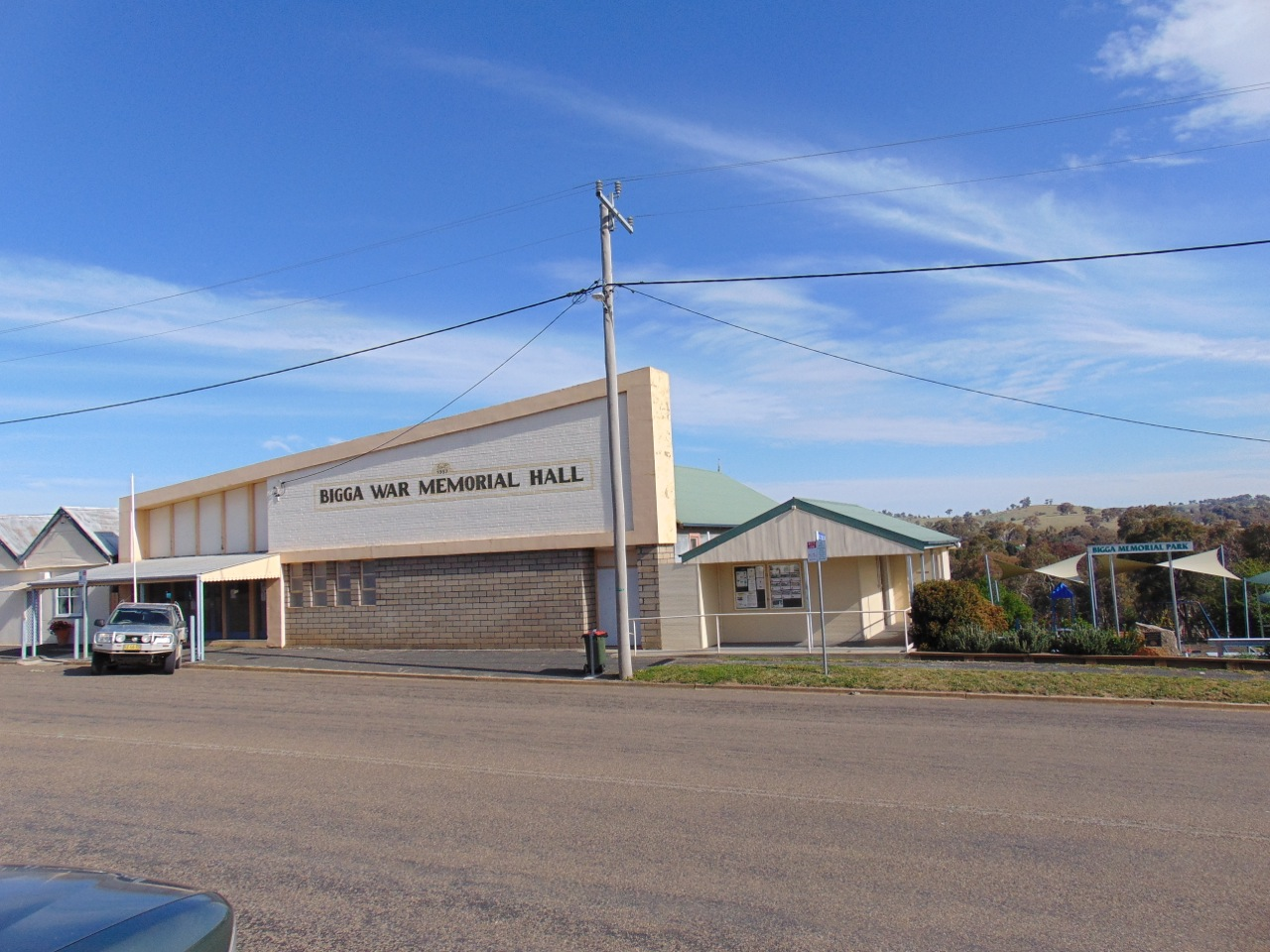
- Bigga War Memorial Hall

- Coordinates: 34°05′S 149°09′E
- Country: Australia
- State: New South Wales
- Region: Southern Tablelands
- LGA: Upper Lachlan Shire
- Location: 191 km (119 mi) SW of Sydney; 142 km (88 mi) S of Bathurst; 91 km (57 mi) NW of Goulburn; 52 km (32 mi) SE of Cowra
- Established: 1892

Government
  - State electorate: Goulburn
  - Federal division: Riverina
- Elevation: 671 m (2,201 ft)

Population
  - Total: 268 (SAL 2021)
- Time zone: UTC+10 (AEST)
  - Summer (DST): UTC+11 (AEDT)
- Postcode: 2583
- County: Georgiana
- Parish: Bigga
Localities around Bigga
Wyangala	Roseberg	Copperhannia
Reids Flat	Bigga	Tuena
Taylors Flat	Narrawa	Crooked Corner

Bigga is a village in the Southern Tablelands of New South Wales, Australia, in Upper Lachlan Shire. It is in the Parish of Bigga, County of Georgiana. The name Bigga is thought to originate as a shortened version of the Biggs Grant. Bigga is on the western side of the Abercrombie Mountains. It is 91 km northwest of Goulburn and 52 km southeast of Cowra. Nearby towns are: Abercrombie River, Binda, Greenmantle, Grabine, Reids Flat, and Tuena. Nearby places are: Blanket Flat and Crooked Corner. These places were once towns.

Bigga is noted for producing some of the world's finest superfine wool.

The earliest explorer into the Bigga area was James Meehan who passed through in April 1820, travelling from Mount McDonald to Bathurst, via what was then called the Fish River, but today is known as the Lachlan River. The first official land sale in the region was of 1,000 acres (400 ha) at Sandy Creek to Samuel A. Blackman in 1835. Sandy Creek was one of the first fine wool farms in the district. During the 1850s there was a land boom and numerous families added to the three original families of the area: the McGuinesses, Blackmans and the Hearnes.

On Christmas Day 1861 bushranger John Peisley shot local innkeeper William Benyon who would die from his wounds seven days later. Peisley was arrested four weeks later and hanged at Bathurst in April 1862. Peisley was a founding member of Frank Gardiner's gang.

After this the area again did not attract new settlers until the 1880s. Bigga village was proclaimed in 1892. In May 1896 a Bigga and Blanket Flat progress association was formed.

== Population ==
At the 2016 census, Bigga and the surrounding area had a population of 245, while at the 2021 census, the population had increased to 268.
