= Crooked Corner, New South Wales =

Crooked Corner New South Wales
- Coordinates: 34°14′S 149°18′E
- Population: 61 (2016 census)
- Postcode(s): 2583
- Elevation: 808 m (2,651 ft)
- Time zone: AEST (UTC+10)
  - Summer (DST): AEDT (UTC+11)
- Location: 15.47 km (10 mi) N of Binda; 18.32 km (11 mi) E of Bigga; 34 km (21 mi) N of Crookwell; 120 km (75 mi) S of Bathurst; 271 km (168 mi) W of Sydney
- LGA(s): Upper Lachlan Shire
- Region: Southern Tablelands
- County: Georgiana
- Parish: Gillindich
- State electorate(s): Goulburn
- Federal division(s): Riverina
Localities around Crooked Corner:
Bigga	Tuena	Peelwood
Taylors Flat	Crooked Corner	Limerick
Narrawa	Binda	Binda

Crooked Corner is a locality on the road from Bigga, New South Wales to Binda, New South Wales, which was once a town. At the 2016 census, it had a population of 61.

Alluvial gold was found there, in 1861, and reef gold, in 1871. In the late 1880s another reef was found to the east of the old alluvial workings, and the Palmer Gold and Silver Mining Company set up a battery there in 1888.

The Five Mile Tree public school operated there from 1892 to 2009.
