= Fullerton, New South Wales =

Locality in Australia

Fullerton
- Town
- Coordinates: 34.1605°S 149.5324°E
- Country: Australia
- State: New South Wales
- Region: Southern Tablelands
- LGA: Upper Lachlan Shire
- Location: 161 km (100 mi) W of Sydney; 123 km (76 mi) N of Canberra

Government
  - State electorate: Goulburn
  - Federal division: Riverina
- Elevation: 770 m (2,530 ft)

Population
  - Total: 47 (SAL 2021)
- Postcode: 2583
Localities around Fullerton
Peelwood	Jeremy	Ballyroe
Peelwood	Fullerton	Golspie
Limerick	Laggan	Golspie

Fullerton is a locality within the Upper Lachlan Shire of New South Wales, Australia. At the 2021 census, Fullerton had a population of 47.

The locality's north eastern border is defined by the Abercrombie River, and its eastern border is defined by the Bolong River, which comes to a confluence with the Abercrombie River. These rivers are part of the Lachlan catchment, in the Murray-Darling Basin. A cemetery with the same name, Bolong Cemetery, is situated in the south of the locality and contains over 100 graves.

The main road running through Fullerton is Fullerton Road, which comes to a junction with Peelwood Road to the south, with the latter continuing on to Crookwell.
