= Oberon Correctional Centre =

Prison in New South Wales, Australia

- Interactive map of Oberon Correctional Centre
- Location: Oberon, New South Wales; 33.929667°S 149.848667°E
- Status: Operational
- Security class: Minimum (male)
- Capacity: 100
- Managed by: Corrective Services NSW

Oberon Correctional Centre is an Australian minimum security prison for young males convicted of both state and federal crimes. It is located in Gurnang, 40 kilometres (25 mi) from Oberon, New South Wales. The centre is operated by Corrective Services NSW an agency of the Department of Communities and Justice of the Government of New South Wales.

The centre caters for one of the final stages of the Corrective Services Young Offenders Program, which attempts to separate younger inmates from older, hardened inmates, and prepares them for eventual release.

The prison has been closed since a memo was circulated in December 2022 announcing a temporary closure due to staffing shortages within Corrective Services NSW.

== See also ==
- Punishment in Australia
