= Murringo =

- Town
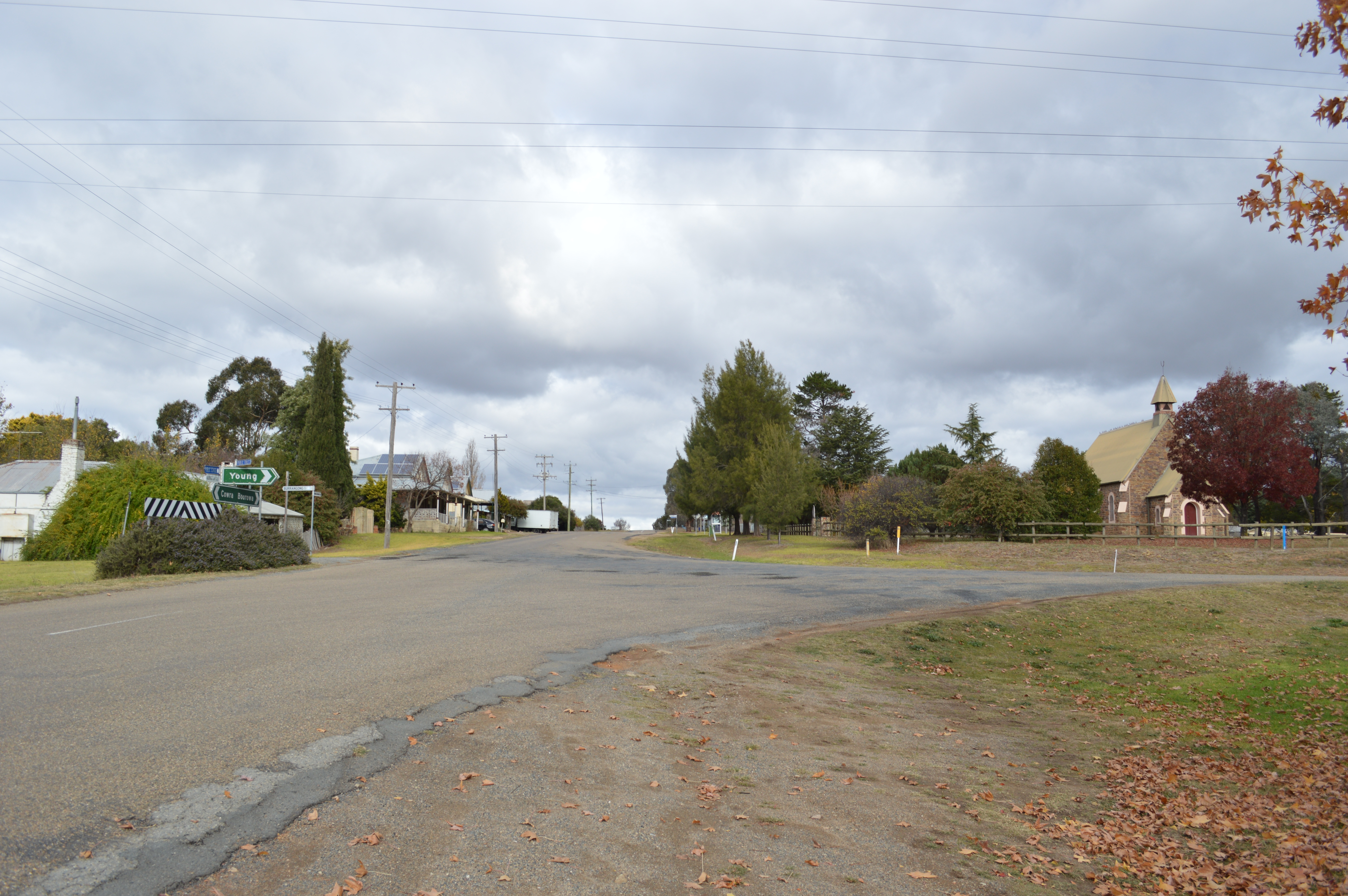
- Main street of Murringo

- Interactive map of Murringo
- Coordinates: 34°17′0″S 148°32′0″E
- Country: Australia
- State: New South Wales
- LGA: Hilltops Council
- Location: 353 km (219 mi) WSW of Sydney; 141 km (88 mi) NW of Canberra; 23 km (14 mi) E of Young

Government
  - State electorate: Cootamundra
  - Federal division: Riverina

Population
  - Total: 390 (SAL 2021)
- Postcode: 2586
- County: Monteagle
- Parish: Murringo
Localities around Murringo
Bendick Murrell	Crowther	Godfreys Creek
Young	Murringo	Frogmore
Wombat	Galong	Boorowa

Murringo is a small village in the southwestern slopes of New South Wales, Australia in Hilltops Council. It was once better known as Marengo. The name is also applied to the surrounding area, for postal and statistical purposes.

== History ==
The area now known as Murringo lies on the traditional lands of the Wiradjuri people, close to the boundaries with the lands of the Ngunawal and Gandangara peoples. The Ngunawal and Gandangara peoples spoke closely related, if not identical, languages.

Although the area was outside the Nineteen Counties, within which settler colonisation was allowed, it was settled relatively early, with the Marengo Station run taken up in 1827. There were 43 settlers on three properties in the area by 1840, 21 of whom lived at the Marengo Station.

The village was known originally as Marengo. Taking its name from nearby Marengo Station, itself possibly named after the site of the Battle of Marengo, or more likely from a word of Aboriginal origin with its spelling applied by colonial settlers to resemble it. Naming a colonial-era landholding after a decisive victory of Napoleon Bonaparte—an enemy of Britain—seems improbable.

The village was surveyed by colonial surveyor James Larmer in 1849, and he seems to have used the name Murringo. It was first proclaimed a village, under that name, in 1850. In 1851, Larmer surveyed a road from the new village to Burrangong Station, near modern-day Young. The village became an early centre for flour milling and a resting place for teams.

It seems that the village still was most commonly known as Marengo, until around 1926. However, according to the Lands Department, the place name was Murringo, and it was proclaimed a village, for a second time under that name, in March 1885, as a consequence of the Crown Lands Act 1884. There is another locality, in the New England region of New South Wales, still known today as Marengo.

Marengo Post Office opened on 1 January 1857 and was renamed Murringo in 1926. The village's public school opened in 1860; it too used the name Marengo, until 1926, when it became Murringo Public School. From 1917, there was also a Catholic Convent School at Murringo, operated by the Sisters of Mercy, for which a new school building was erected in 1929. The opening of the convent saw an exodus of over half the existing pupils at the public school. The convent school closed in 1961. It was sold and became a private residence in 1974.

The village ceased to grow much further in population, after the discovery of gold in 1860 at Lambing Flat, now known as Young, Young was on the route of the Blayney-Demondrille railway line, from 1885, and grew to become the regional town.

During the 1860s, the area around Murringo was the scene of criminal acts by the bushrangers, Frank Gardiner, Ben Hall, John Gilbert, John Dunn, John O'Meally, and others. Gilbert had previously worked as a stock keeper on a property near Murringo and was well known in the area. The rough country near the Murringo Gap on the Murringo to Cowra road and the more distant Weddin Mountains were suitable hideouts for bushrangers. In 1862, a police search in the district led to a farcical arrest of two Murringo women, dressed in their brothers' clothes, who had been tracked by the police who were pursuing Gardiner.

Murringo was one of the childhood homes of Bill O'Reilly, from 1908 to 1917, while his father, Ernest O'Reilly, was a teacher at the public school. O'Reilly became an Australian Test cricketer and renowned as a leg spin bowler. Murringo was where he first played the game of cricket, and he later remembered his time there as one of the happiest of his life.

== Present day ==
At the 2021 census, Murringo and the surrounding area had a population of 390, up from 365 in 2016 and 322 in 2011.

Murringo's appearance is little changed since its heyday, being described as a small but perfectly formed village. It is the oldest village in the region. Buildings such as its former inns, former convent and former police station remain. Its school building is still in use.

The village has two churches—Christ Church Anglican (opened 1866) and Sacred Heart Catholic (commenced 1874, opened 1877)—a village hall—commemorating local soldiers of the First World War—and a relatively large and prominent cemetery for its size.
