= Golspie, New South Wales =

Golspie
- Town
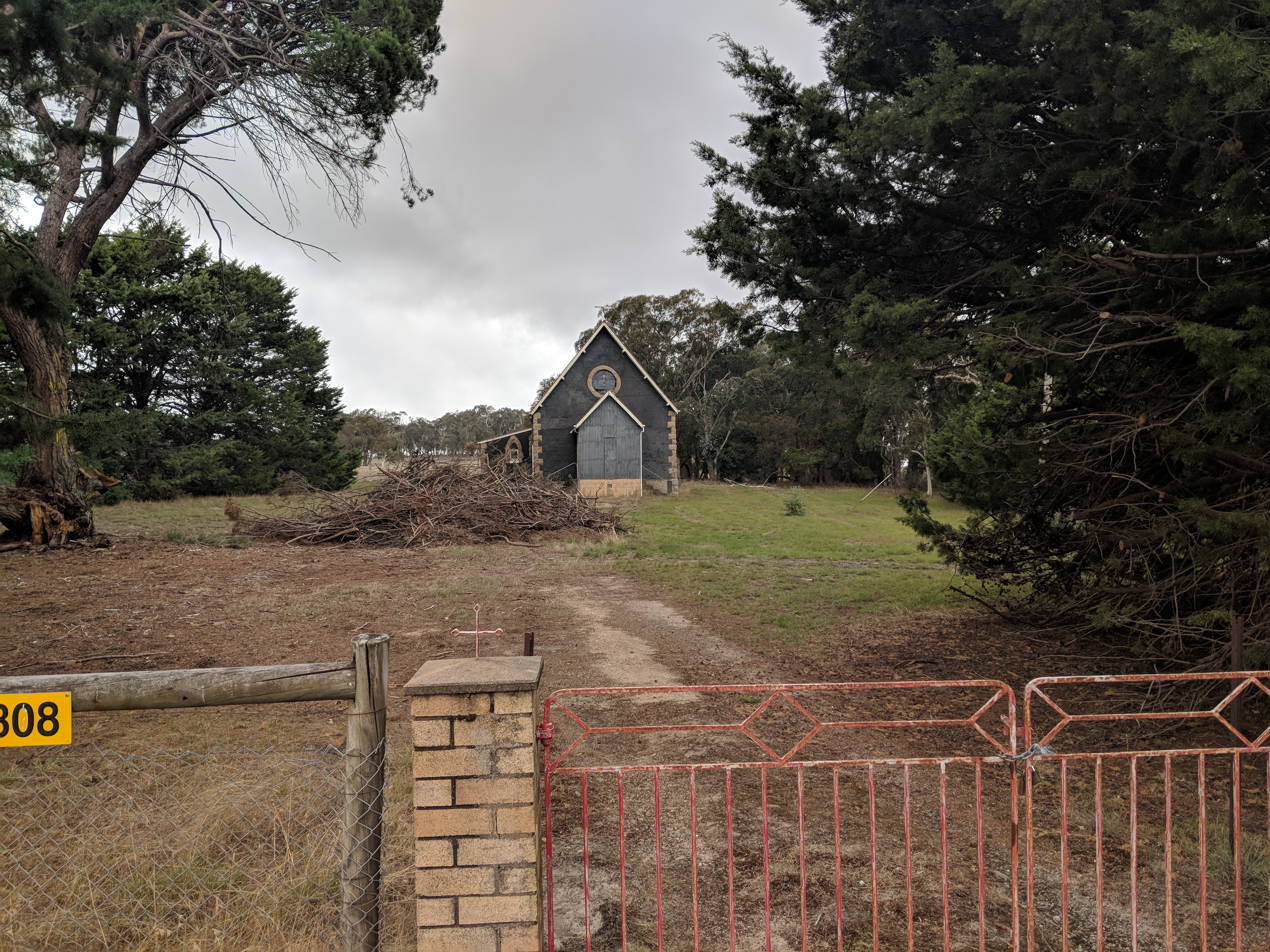
- Church in Golspie

- Coordinates: 34°17′43″S 149°40′43″E
- Country: Australia
- State: New South Wales
- Region: Southern Tablelands
- LGA: Upper Lachlan Shire
- Location: 37 km (23 mi) NE of Crookwell; 68 km (42 mi) N of Goulburn; 261 km (162 mi) WSW of Sydney; 143 km (89 mi) S of Bathurst

Government
  - State electorate: Goulburn
  - Federal division: Riverina
- Elevation: 876 m (2,874 ft)

Population
  - Total: 58 (2016 census)
- Postcode: 2580
- County: Georgiana
- Parish: Hillas
Localities around Golspie
Fullerton		Yalbraith
Laggan	Golspie	Richlands
Laggan	Laggan	Stonequarry

Golspie is located in the Upper Lachlan Shire of New South Wales, Australia. It is primarily a livestock farming area. The closest towns to Golspie are Taralga and Crookwell. At the 2021 census, it had a population of 81.
