= Frogmore, New South Wales =

Frogmore
- Town
- Coordinates: 34.26°S 148.85°E
- Country: Australia
- State: New South Wales
- LGA: Hilltops Council
- Location: 64 km (40 mi) SE of Cowra; 74 km (46 mi) E of Young; 80 km (50 mi) W of Crookwell; 125 km (78 mi) WNW of Goulburn; 319 km (198 mi) WSW of Sydney

Government
  - State electorate: Goulburn
  - Federal division: Riverina
- Elevation: 513 m (1,683 ft)

Population
  - Total: 146 (SAL 2021)
- Postcode: 2586
- County: King
- Mean max temp: 20.9 °C (69.6 °F)
- Mean min temp: 8.0 °C (46.4 °F)
- Annual rainfall: 593.7 mm (23.37 in)
Localities around Frogmore
Godfreys Creek	Hovells Creek	Reids Flat
Murringo	Frogmore	Taylors Flat
Murringo	Boorowa	Rugby
- Coordinates, rainfall, localities

Frogmore is a village in the Southern Tablelands of New South Wales, Australia. It was previously a mining town.

== Mining history ==
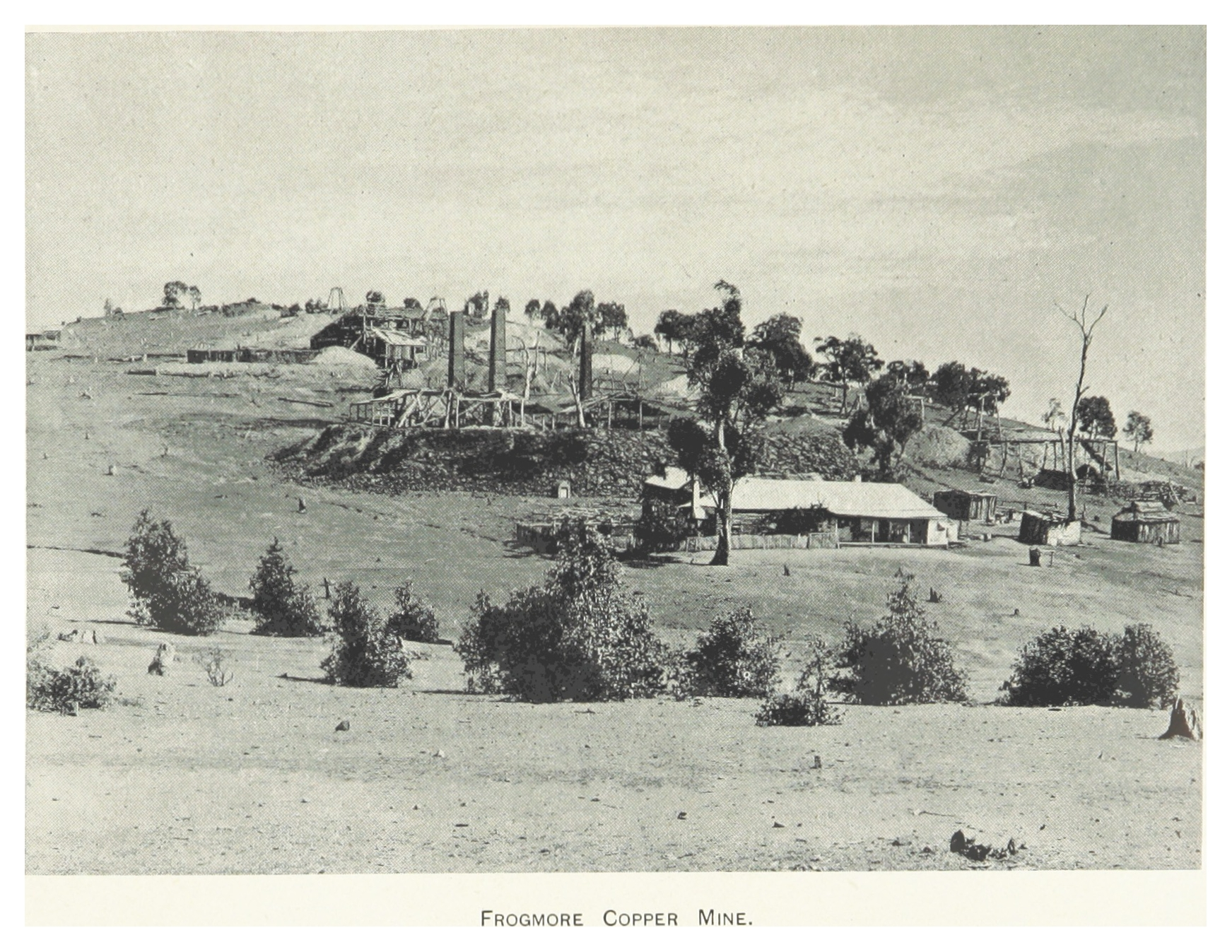
Frogmore copper mine in 1899

Copper was first discovered and mined in Frogmore in the 1850s, but mining has not continued since 1907, despite further exploration since the 1950s. Silver and tungsten have also been mined around Frogmore.

In the 1870s, there were two copper mines operating in Frogmore – the Deer Brothers mine and the Bensusan mine. Copper was also mined north west of Frogmore.

In 1882, quartz reef gold was found to the north of Frogmore, resulting in a minor rush to stake claims, but there were no significant gold mines in the area.

== Community and facilities ==
Frogmore had a public school from 1875 to 1982. The village has an Anglican church, a Uniting church (formerly Methodist), and a Catholic church, St John the Baptist, with a Catholic cemetery in its grounds. There is also a general cemetery.

The community hall was burned down in a bushfire in 1997, and fundraising for its replacement included a Pass the hat around concert by Lee Kernaghan. There is a rural fire station on the site of the old hall and the new hall is adjacent to it.

In the 2016 census, Frogmore's population was 132, which had grown to 146 in 2021.

== Climate ==
Frogmore has a climate intermediate between that of the South Eastern Highlands and South Western Slopes, most similar to Yass. Diurnal range is generally high year round, but markedly lesser in winter due to greater cloud cover. Precipitation peaks slightly in winter.

Climate data for Frogmore (1969–1990, rainfall 1898–1993); 500 m AMSL; 34.27° S, 148.84° E
Month	Jan	Feb	Mar	Apr	May	Jun	Jul	Aug	Sep	Oct	Nov	Dec	Year
Record high °C (°F)	42.4 (108.3)	42.2 (108.0)	36.8 (98.2)	33.7 (92.7)	29.7 (85.5)	21.6 (70.9)	21.6 (70.9)	24.7 (76.5)	29.9 (85.8)	33.0 (91.4)	37.8 (100.0)	38.9 (102.0)	42.4 (108.3)
Mean daily maximum °C (°F)	29.9 (85.8)	29.2 (84.6)	26.2 (79.2)	21.4 (70.5)	16.7 (62.1)	12.9 (55.2)	11.9 (53.4)	13.4 (56.1)	16.2 (61.2)	20.4 (68.7)	24.3 (75.7)	28.1 (82.6)	20.9 (69.6)
Mean daily minimum °C (°F)	14.5 (58.1)	14.4 (57.9)	12.1 (53.8)	8.8 (47.8)	5.5 (41.9)	2.6 (36.7)	1.8 (35.2)	3.0 (37.4)	4.7 (40.5)	7.3 (45.1)	9.5 (49.1)	12.3 (54.1)	8.0 (46.4)
Record low °C (°F)	3.8 (38.8)	0.6 (33.1)	1.1 (34.0)	−1.2 (29.8)	−6.4 (20.5)	−5.2 (22.6)	−6.2 (20.8)	−6.5 (20.3)	−2.6 (27.3)	−2.0 (28.4)	−0.5 (31.1)	1.6 (34.9)	−6.5 (20.3)
Average precipitation mm (inches)	52.4 (2.06)	38.4 (1.51)	41.3 (1.63)	50.9 (2.00)	46.0 (1.81)	56.1 (2.21)	53.3 (2.10)	55.8 (2.20)	49.4 (1.94)	54.7 (2.15)	48.8 (1.92)	52.9 (2.08)	593.7 (23.37)
