= Gurnang, New South Wales =

Gurnang New South Wales
- Coordinates: 34°01′56″S 149°51′00″E
- Population: 125 (2016 census)
- Postcode(s): 2787
- Time zone: AEST (UTC+10)
  - Summer (DST): AEDT (UTC+11)
- Location: 48 km (30 mi) S of Oberon; 117 km (73 mi) NE of Katoomba
- LGA(s): Oberon
- Region: Central Tablelands
- State electorate(s): Bathurst
- Federal division(s): Calare

Gurnang is a small rural locality 48 kilometres (30 mi) south of Oberon in the Oberon Shire, part of the Central Tablelands region of New South Wales, Australia.

The Oberon Correctional Centre is within the locality. 100% of the population recorded at the 2016 Census was male; with a median age of 24.

== Climate ==
Climate data for Gurnang State Forest (1933–1975); 1,148 m AMSL; 34.01° S, 149.84° E
Month	Jan	Feb	Mar	Apr	May	Jun	Jul	Aug	Sep	Oct	Nov	Dec	Year
Record high °C (°F)	34.5 (94.1)	34.4 (93.9)	31.1 (88.0)	25.6 (78.1)	23.3 (73.9)	16.7 (62.1)	15.0 (59.0)	18.9 (66.0)	23.9 (75.0)	26.7 (80.1)	28.9 (84.0)	33.3 (91.9)	34.5 (94.1)
Mean daily maximum °C (°F)	22.8 (73.0)	22.1 (71.8)	20.2 (68.4)	15.4 (59.7)	11.1 (52.0)	8.1 (46.6)	7.4 (45.3)	8.7 (47.7)	12.2 (54.0)	15.5 (59.9)	18.1 (64.6)	21.5 (70.7)	15.3 (59.5)
Mean daily minimum °C (°F)	9.0 (48.2)	9.3 (48.7)	7.3 (45.1)	3.8 (38.8)	1.0 (33.8)	−0.3 (31.5)	−1.6 (29.1)	−0.7 (30.7)	0.4 (32.7)	3.2 (37.8)	5.1 (41.2)	7.2 (45.0)	3.6 (38.5)
Record low °C (°F)	−0.6 (30.9)	0.0 (32.0)	−5.6 (21.9)	−4.4 (24.1)	−8.0 (17.6)	−7.8 (18.0)	−10.0 (14.0)	−10.1 (13.8)	−6.7 (19.9)	−6.7 (19.9)	−3.3 (26.1)	−1.1 (30.0)	−10.1 (13.8)
Average precipitation mm (inches)	89.8 (3.54)	78.9 (3.11)	67.7 (2.67)	70.4 (2.77)	76.2 (3.00)	96.5 (3.80)	84.6 (3.33)	89.1 (3.51)	77.9 (3.07)	85.2 (3.35)	85.3 (3.36)	75.6 (2.98)	1,008.5 (39.70)
Average precipitation days (≥ 0.2 mm)	8.9	8.8	8.6	9.5	10.9	14.1	13.3	13.1	10.6	10.6	10.2	9.0	127.6
Source: Australian Bureau of Meteorology; Gurnang State Forest
