= Binda, New South Wales =

Binda
- Town
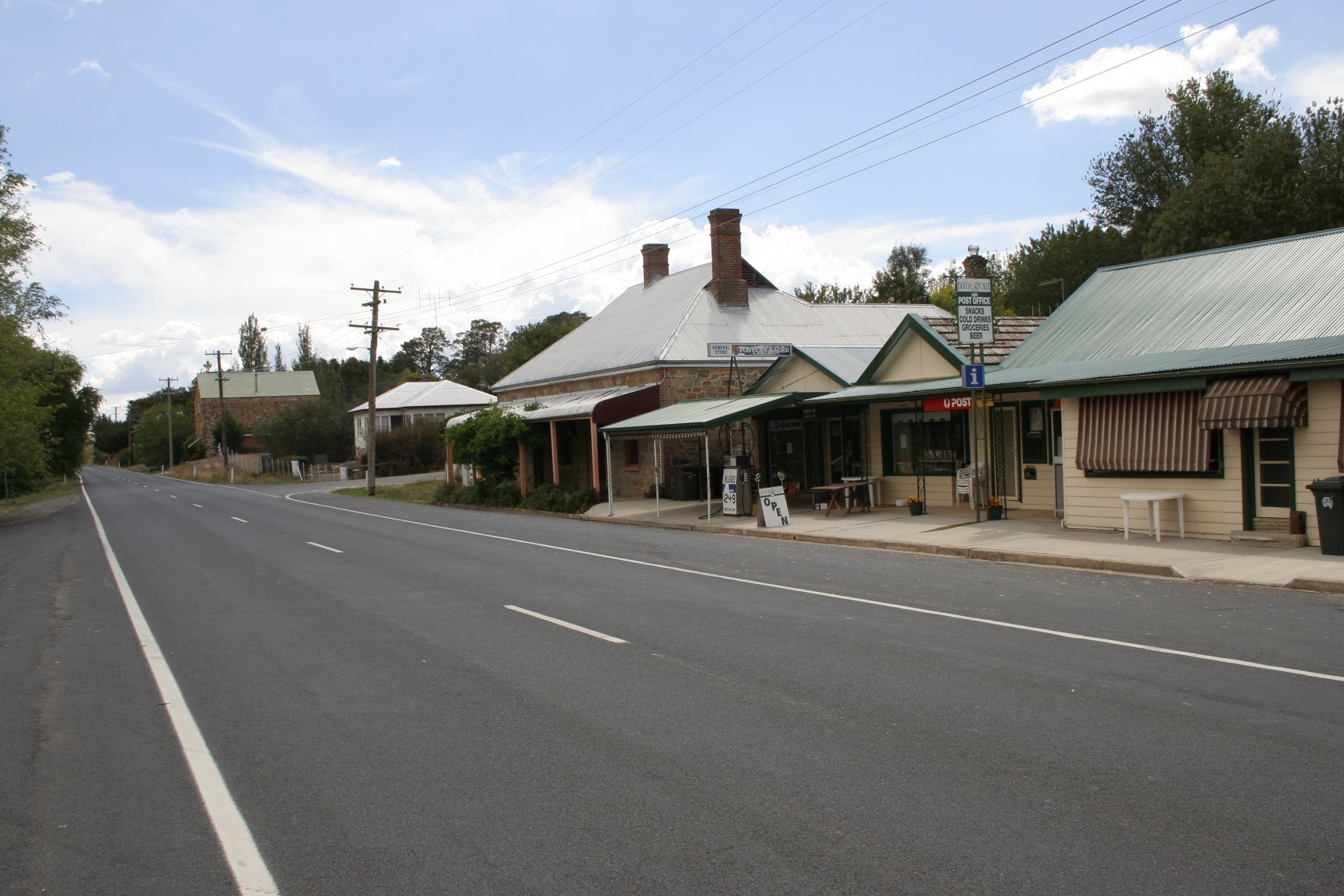

- Coordinates: 34°20′S 149°22′E
- Country: Australia
- State: New South Wales
- Region: Southern Tablelands
- LGA: Upper Lachlan Shire
- Location: 260 km (160 mi) WSW of Sydney; 110 km (68 mi) N of Canberra; 17 km (11 mi) NW of Crookwell; 63 km (39 mi) N of Gunning; 124 km (77 mi) S of Bathurst
- Established: 1850

Government
  - State electorate: Goulburn
  - Federal division: Riverina
- Elevation: 741 m (2,431 ft)

Population
  - Total: 291 (SAL 2021)
- Time zone: UTC+10 (AEST)
  - Summer (DST): UTC+11 (AEDT)
- Postcode: 2583
- County: Georgiana
- Parish: Binda
Localities around Binda
Crooked Corner	Crooked Corner	Limerick
Narrawa	Binda	Laggan
Lost River	Crookwell	Crookwell

Binda (/bɪndə/) is a village in the Southern Tablelands region of New South Wales, Australia in Upper Lachlan Shire.

It is about 17 km north-north-west of Crookwell in the county of Georgiana. Other near-by towns or locations are:

- Crooked Corner
- Peelwood
- Redground
- Wheeo
- Narrawa North

== History ==
The origin of the name is thought to be from the Gandangara Aboriginal word for deep water.

The site of Binda was explored in 1820 by James Meehan and John Oxley and the first pastoral runs were taken by Francis Oakes, Chief Constable of Parramatta, Rowland Hassall and Thomas Bray in 1825 and 1826. The town was a listed locality in the census of 1828.

The town was gazetted in 1850 with subdivision for sale in 1852 making it the oldest town in Crookwell Shire and the rich Pastoral leases and discovery of gold at Tuena, 33 kilometres to the north caused the town to grow quickly, with a School (1851), post office (1852), Court of Petty Sessions (1863), and Anglican church (1864) following soon. The town reach about a thousand persons in the 1870s.

Bushrangers Whitton and Reynolds and later Ben Hall robbed the town at this time.

In the 20th century came a Cricket club (1880), Memorial Hall (1920), Sisters of Mercy convent (1920), rugby league club (1922) Graziers Association (1923) and hockey club (1932).

== Population ==
At the 2016 census, Binda had a population of 280 people which had increased to 291 at the 2021 census.

== Prominent landmarks ==
Prominent buildings today include the old Flag Hotel (c. 1852), St James Anglican Church, the government school, Rose Cottage, an inn built about 1890, the steam mill built about 1860, the former store-post office (c. 1870), the Anglican rectory (1874) and Binda cemetery (interments date back to 1850).
