= Laggan, New South Wales =

Laggan New South Wales
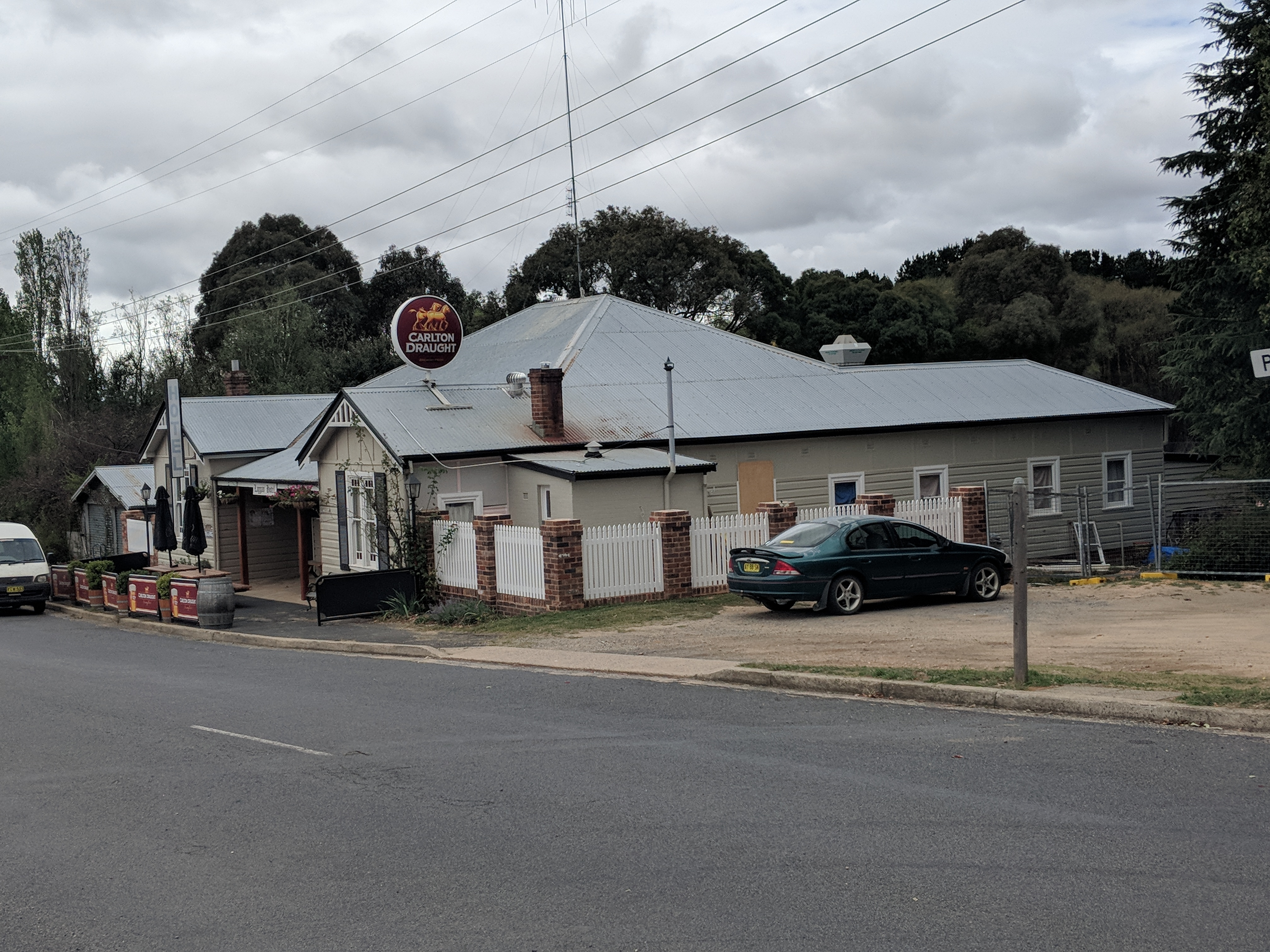

- Coordinates: 34°25′S 149°32′E
- Population: 407 (SAL 2021)
- Postcode(s): 2583
- Elevation: 900 m (2,953 ft)
- Location: 165 km (103 mi) SW of Sydney; 43 km (27 mi) NW of Goulburn; 8 km (5 mi) NE of Crookwell; 111 km (69 mi) S of Bathurst
- LGA(s): Upper Lachlan Shire
- State electorate(s): Goulburn
- Federal division(s): Riverina
Localities around Laggan:
Binda	Fullerton	Golspie
Binda	Laggan	Taralga
Crookwell	Crookwell	Roslyn

Laggan is a small village in the Southern Tablelands, New South Wales, Australia in Upper Lachlan Shire. At the 2016 census, Laggan had a population of 358.

The village/locality has a small primary school. There are many historic buildings including the old police barracks c1837 and a rebuilt mill.

Laggan was founded for pastoral use, as well as a stop for convicts during the building of roads between Bathurst and Goulburn. The village is now a tourist attraction.

Annual ploughing matches were held at Laggan in the 1860s.

== Historic hotels ==
=== Rose, Thistle and Shamrock Inn ===
One of the earliest hotels in Laggan was the Rose, Thistle and Shamrock Inn, owned by R. J. Sheriff. He had it up for auction in 1855, for which the advertisement stated it was a stone house. Daniel O'Brien was the owner in Jan 1859, and by 1883 was granted the publicans licence.

=== Sportsmans Arms ===
The Sportsmans Arms was in operation in 1863 and licensed by John S. Paris, and previously by Sir Colin Campbell. By October 1865, Robert Stephenson was granted the publicans licence and held it until 27 May 1874 when Thomas McCormack was granted the publicans licence.

== Churches ==
=== Church of England ===
The foundation stone for the Church of England at Laggan was laid on the 5 November 1922. Engraved on the stone:-"A. D. M. G. All Saints: Laggan. This stone was laid by the Lord Bishop of Goulburn on Nov. 5th 1922."

=== Presbyterian Church ===
The Presbyterian Church at Laggan was opened on the 14 December 1876; the foundation stone having been laid about six months earlier.

=== Roman Catholic Church ===
The Roman Catholic Church at Laggan was built in the Gothic style, and was opened by Rev. Father McAlroy on 26 March 1865. A new Roman Catholic Church building in McAlister Road was opened on 21 June 1925 by Dr. Barry.
