= Tuena =

Tuena New South Wales
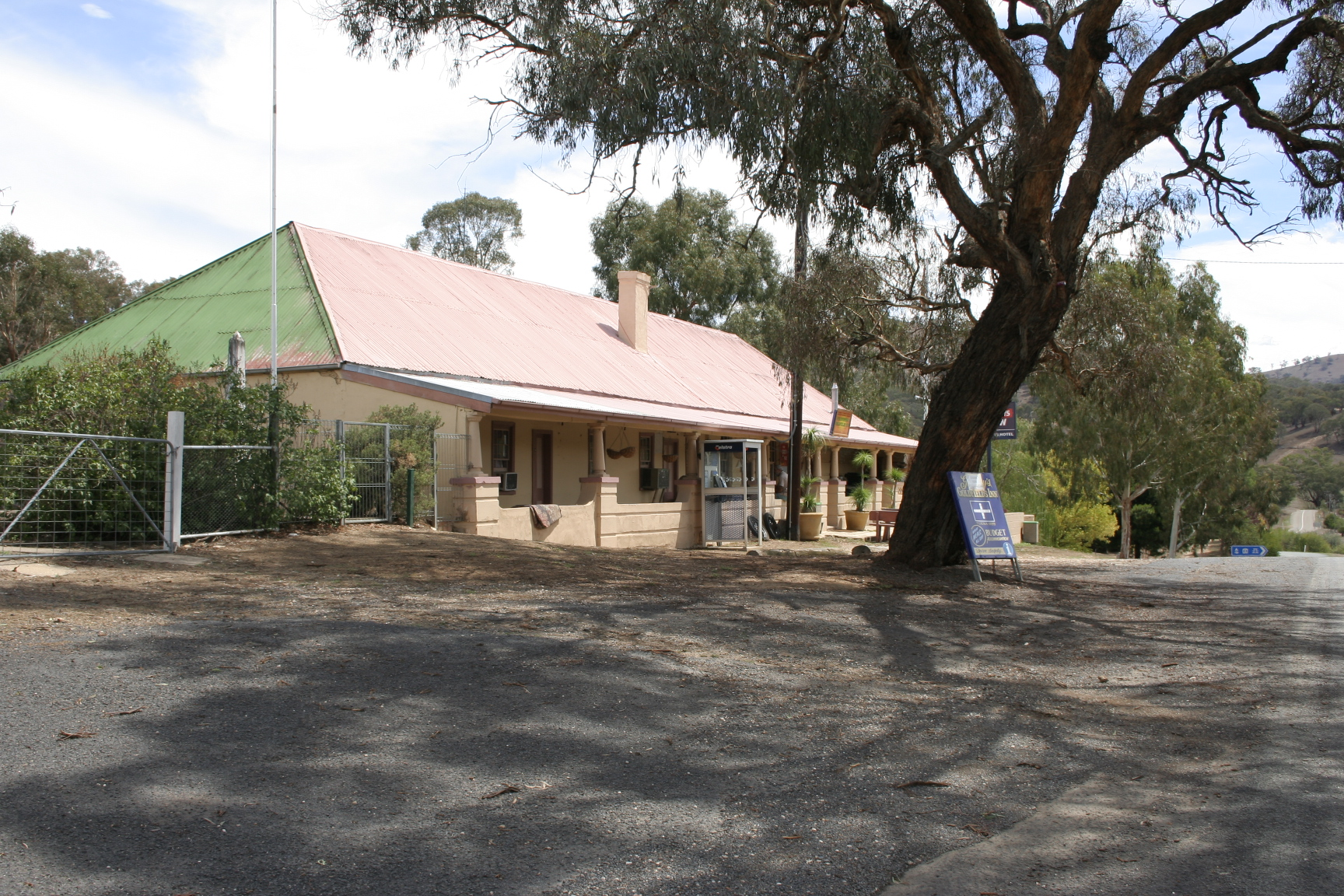
- Goldfields Inn

- Coordinates: 34°02′S 149°20′E
- Population: 81 (2021 census)
- Postcode(s): 2583
- Elevation: 490 m (1,608 ft)
- Location: 269 km (167 mi) W of Sydney; 85 km (53 mi) S of Bathurst; 102 km (63 mi) N of Goulburn; 58 km (36 mi) N of Crookwell; 65 km (40 mi) S of Blayney
- LGA(s): Upper Lachlan Shire
- Region: Southern Tablelands
- County: Georgiana
- Parish: Yarraman
- State electorate(s): Goulburn
- Federal division(s): Riverina
Localities around Tuena:
Bigga	Abercrombie River	Jeremy
Bigga	Tuena	Peelwood
Bigga	Crooked Corner	Peelwood

Tuena is a town in the Southern Tablelands of New South Wales, Australia, in Upper Lachlan Shire. It is located on Tuena Creek, tributary of the Abercrombie River, 269 km (167 mi) west of the state capital, Sydney. At the 2016 census, Tuena and the surrounding area had a population of 59.

Only nine months after the first payable discovery of gold in Australia at Ophir (start of the Australian gold rushes), gold was found at Tuena.

== History ==
The site was first explored by Dr. Charles Throsby in 1819, with the first landholder, Samuel Blackman, arriving in 1836. In May 1859, Tuena was formally declared a town. It was surveyed and streets were laid out, although with the exception of Bathurst Road, little of the original town plan is evident today.

Gold was discovered at Tuena in November 1851, although gold had been discovered on the Abercrombie River (the Tarshish Diggings), 10 km north some months earlier. The following extract from a contemporary newspaper announces the discovery at Tuena.

Bathurst Free Press and Mining Journal (Newspaper), 15 November 1851: —

On the latter part of last week, news arrived on the river, and was quickly circulated through the surrounding country that very, rich diggings had been discovered on Tuena Creek, at one of Mr. Smith's sheep stations, known by the name of the Sapling Hut. He proceeded to the place and found a body of men very busily engaged digging up the bed of one of his sheep-yards and procuring gold in abundance.

Rapid growth due to the gold rush saw construction of many buildings, a post office and police station in 1852, three pubs including the Goldfields Inn (1866), Parson's store, a courthouse (1860s) and a school (1860). The current school dates only to 1889.

During the years of gold mining, the town received a boost from the discovery of copper and silver ore with some gold, around 1884, at what became the Mount Costigan Mine, to the east of Tuena. The mine closed for the first time in April 1889, to raise more capital, and production resumed later in the same year. The mine was closed again by March 1892. After that the mine seems to have been worked sporadically, by various owners, on a small scale. The last attempt to reopen the mine seems to have been in 1927.

During the 1930s, gold was mined using a gold dredge on Tuena Creek.

The town's last hotel, The Goldfilds Inn, formerly the Tuena Hotel, closed in 2012.

The town also boasts three churches - St. Mark's Anglican (1886), thought to be the oldest timber 'miner's church' still standing, the stone St. Margaret's Presbyterian (1890), and St. Mary's Catholic Church in 1896 (built of bricks from the old Cordillera mine).

The heavily forested and mountainous countryside, nearby Abercrombie Caves, and presence of the goldfields made Tuena an attraction for bushrangers including Ben Hall, Frank Gardiner, John Vane, Johnny Gilbert, John O'Meally, Cummins, and Lowry.
