= Frank Gardiner =

Australian bushranger (1830–1882)

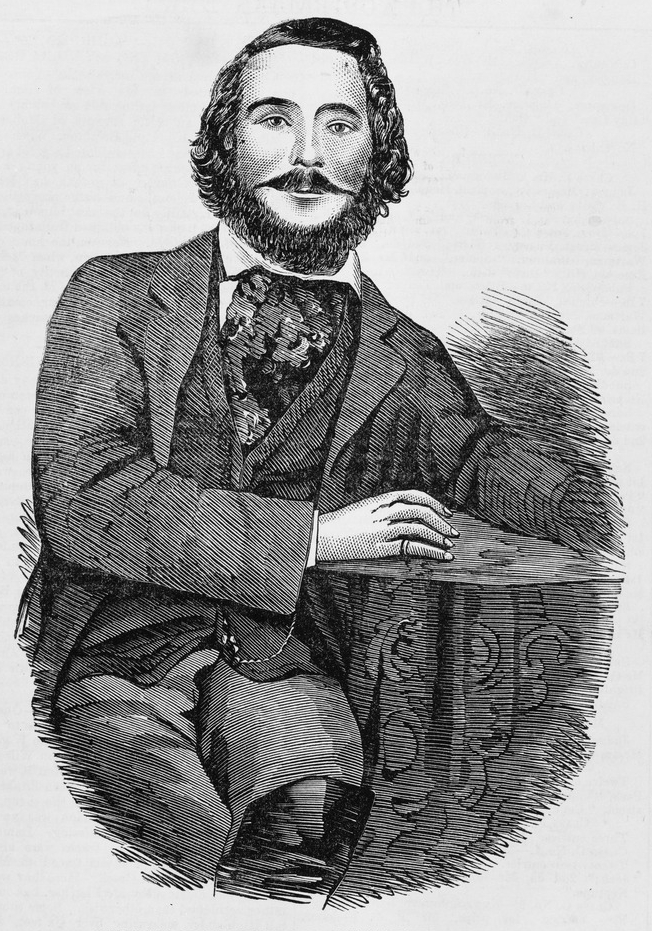
- Gardiner, 1864
- Born: Francis Christie; 1830; Ross-shire, Scotland
- Died: c. 1882; San Francisco, United States
- Other names: Andrew Taylor; Frank Clarke; Frank Jones; Frank Gardiner; 'The Darkie'
- Occupation: Bushranger
- Children: John Gardiner

Frank Gardiner (1830 – c. 1882) was an Australian bushranger who became notorious for his lead role in the largest gold heist in Australian history, at Eugowra, New South Wales in June 1862. Gardiner and his gang, which included bushrangers Ben Hall, John O'Meally and John Gilbert, made off with a pile of cash and 77 kilograms of gold, worth about $10 million in modern Australian currency.

After the Eugowra robbery, Gardiner escaped to Queensland, where he ran a general store until he was tracked down by police in 1864. Following his arrest, he was tried at the Supreme Court of New South Wales and sentenced to 32 years imprisonment. In response to a petition for his release, he was pardoned after 10 years and exiled. He moved to the United States, where he died in or around 1882.

== Early life ==
Gardiner, born Francis Christie, was born in 1830 in Ross-shire, Scotland. He migrated to Australia as a child in 1834. Also aboard was Henry Monro, a wealthy Scottish businessman who would soon form a relationship with his mother, Jane. In 1835 Monro appointed his father, Charles Christie, as overseer of his property at Boro Creek, south of Goulburn. In 1837, Monro obtained the lease for a property on the Campaspe Plains, about 80 km northwest of Melbourne with Charles again the overseer. By 1840 Monro had the lease on another run near Hotspur, about 50 km north of Portland in western Victoria. Once again Charles was overseer and moved there with the young family.

== Appearance ==
Gardiner was 5 ft 9 inches tall. He had an athletic build, with brown wavy hair and hazel eyes, and he was described as "attractive with a face of a corsair and a smooth voice."

== Early career ==
In 1850, Gardiner was working as a stockman in central Victoria. Perhaps realising that this career meant hard work and little money, he and two accomplices stole a large mob of horses from William Morton's station near Serpentine on the Loddon, 40 km northwest of present-day Bendigo. They planned to sell the horses in Portland. However, Morton followed their tracks to Bilston's Inn, near Heywood, where the trio were arrested. Gardiner was tried under his real name, Christie, at Geelong on 22 October 1850 and sentenced to five years' hard labour.

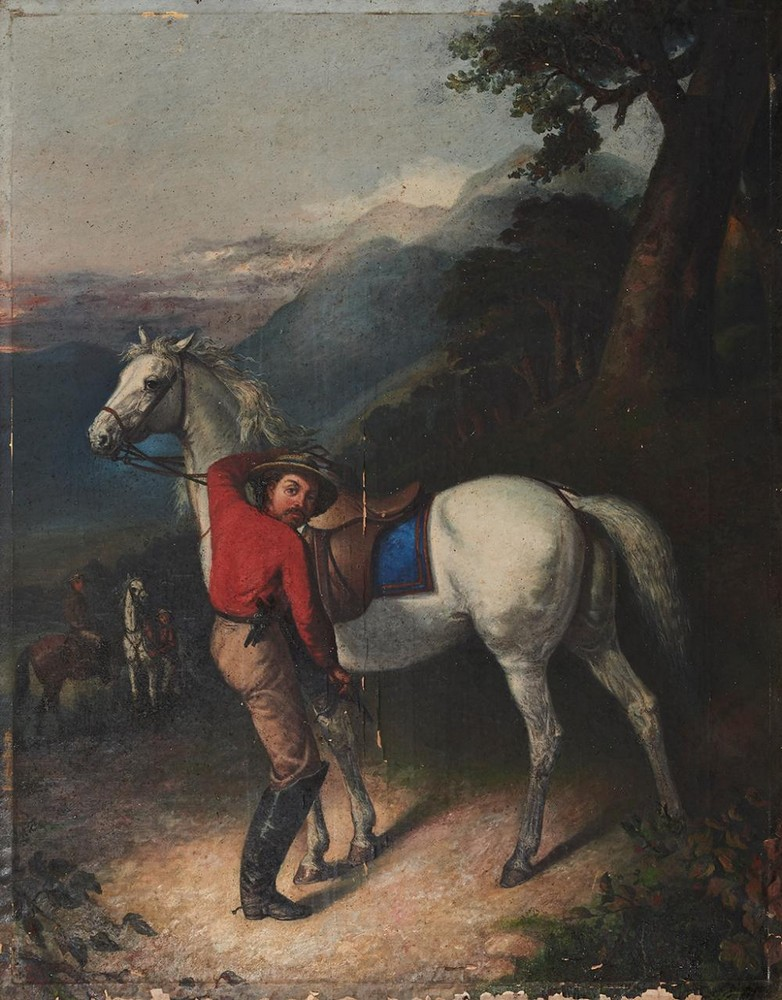
Frank Gardiner during his bushranging days

On 20 March 1851, Gardiner was part of a work party working outside Pentridge Prison when they rushed the guards and escaped. Most of the convicts were rounded up within days but Gardiner escaped and made his way to New South Wales, perhaps stopping at the station in central Victoria where his father and younger sisters were living. There are scattered reports of him having been arrested at the McIvor diggings on suspicion of robbing the gold escort the previous week. However, there is no record of him ever appearing in court in this matter.

It is likely that he moved up to NSW and teamed up with a youth named Prior to resume his horse stealing career. In February 1854 Gardiner (now calling himself Clarke) and Prior were caught trying to sell stolen horses at Yass. This time he was sentenced to fourteen years (seven years for each charge). While imprisoned on Cockatoo Island he met the bushranger John Peisley.

Frank Clarke was granted a ticket-of-leave in December 1859, conditional on him staying in the Carcoar district. Calling himself Frank Jones he opened a butcher shop at Spring Creek, Lambing Flat, but was arrested in May 1861 on a cattle-stealing charge and committed for trial but allowed bail. He then absconded, after which it was discovered he was a prisoner absent from his district. Gardiner joined with Peisley for a short period and was briefly captured after a gunfight with two troopers at Fogg's hut near Reids Flat. Gardiner and Fogg managed to bribe one of the policemen to allow Gardiner to escape.

== Eugowra Rocks robbery ==
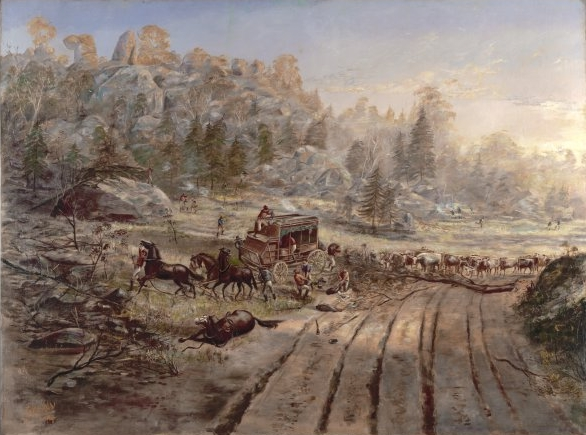
Robbery of the gold escort

In June 1862 he bailed up the Lachlan Gold Escort near Eugowra with a gang including Ben Hall, Dan Charters and Johnny Gilbert. This hold-up is considered to be one of the largest gold robberies in Australian history. The total value of the gold and bank-notes taken was estimated at £14,000 (approximately A$12.5 million in 2012 terms). Much of the gold was recovered by mounted police after they surprised the gang on Wheoga Hill near Forbes. What happened to the remaining gold is still the subject of much speculation and rumour. Treasure hunters still visit the area and it is even rumoured that two Americans who were thought to be Gardiner's nephews visited the Wheogo Station near the Weddins in 1912 claiming to be miners.

== Capture and exile ==
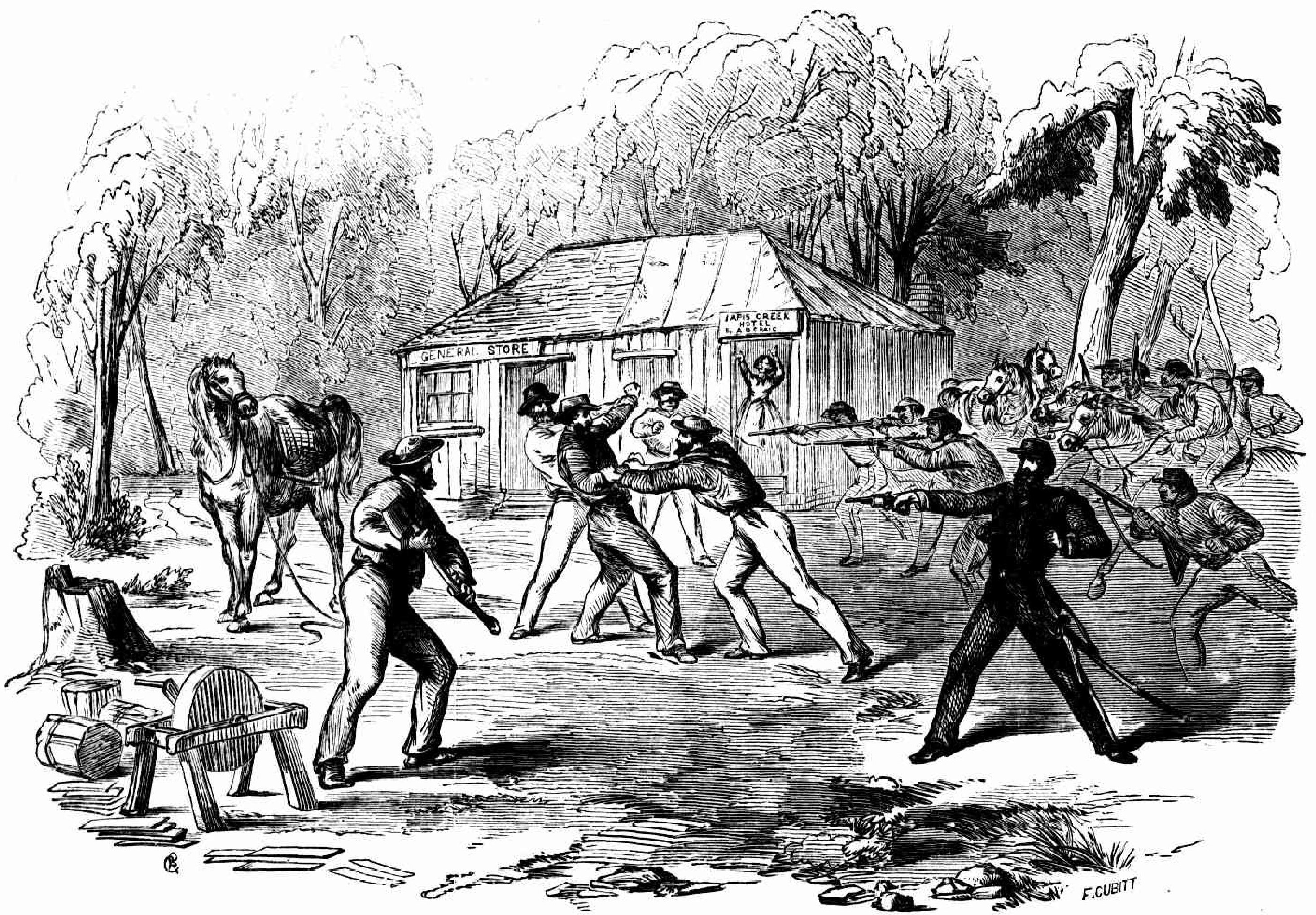
The capture of Gardiner at Apis Creek, Queensland

While the rest of the gold robbers stayed in the district and were rounded up and caught, Gardiner opted to flee to Queensland. In 1863–1864, Gardiner was living with Ben Hall's sister-in-law Kitty Brown, at Apis Creek near Rockhampton, Queensland, where he was running a general store. He was recognised and reported to the police in Sydney. Gardiner was apprehended in controversial circumstances by both NSW police operating outside their jurisdiction and by troopers of the paramilitary Native Police. One of the NSW policemen used Gardiner's own horse 'Darkie' during the capture. The bushranger was taken back to Sydney, and sentenced in July 1864 to 32 years' hard labour "on the roads".

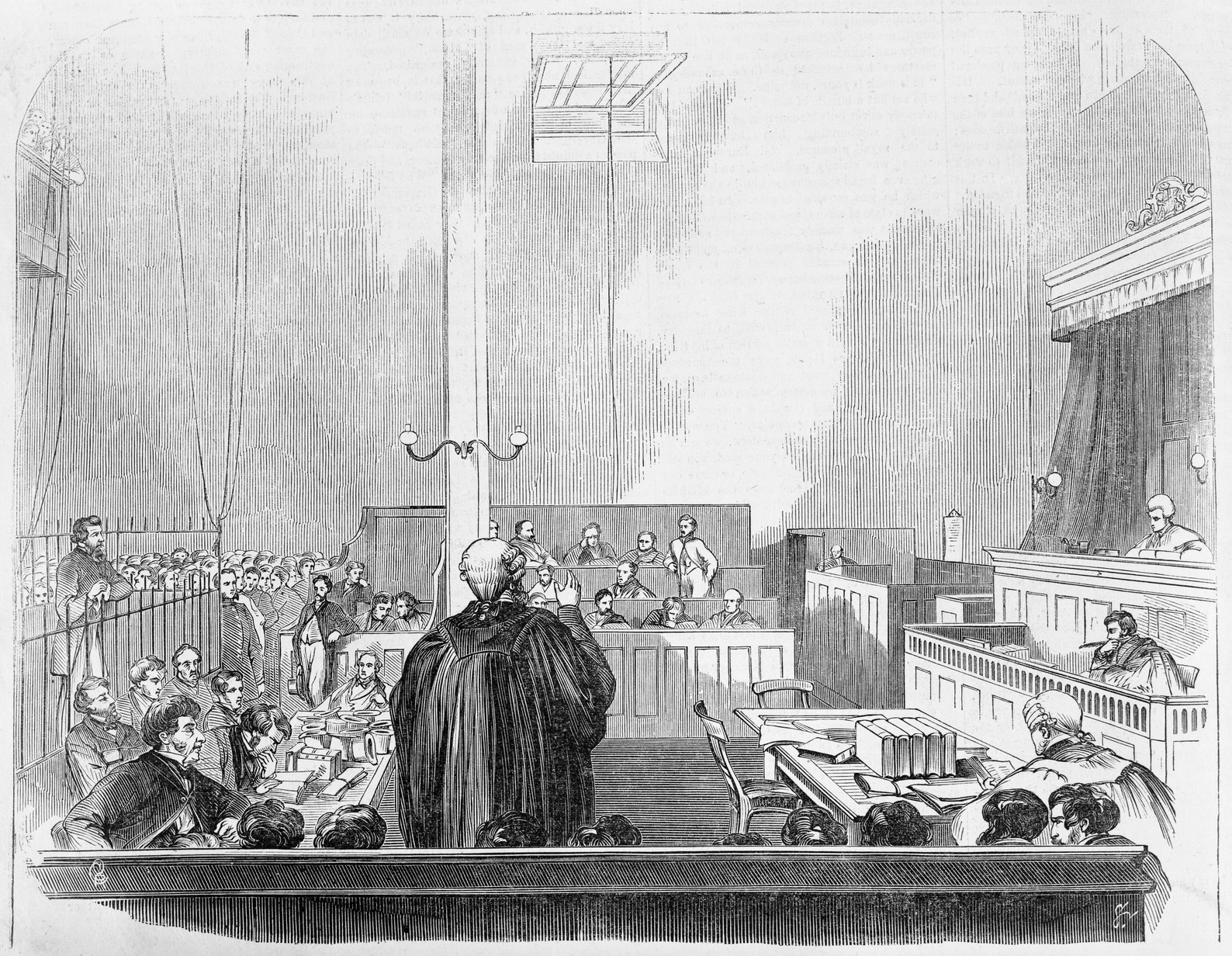
Trial of Gardiner at the Supreme Court

In 1872 a petition was organised by Gardiner's sisters seeking Gardiner's early release, prepared for presentation to the newly appointed Governor of New South Wales, Sir Hercules Robinson. The Governor, as representative of the English sovereign, had the power to exercise the Royal prerogative of mercy for felony cases not subject to the death penalty. By the time it reached the Governor in September 1872 it had attracted the signatures of a number of prominent public men, including members of parliament and the former Colonial Secretary, William Forster. After consideration, Robinson decided that Gardiner could be eligible for a pardon, but only after he had served ten years incarceration and providing his conduct in prison remained good, conditional upon him leaving the country on release and becoming an exile from the Australian colonies and New Zealand.

== San Francisco ==
In late 1874, Gardiner arrived in California having travelled via Hong Kong. Gardiner owned the Twilight Star Saloon on Kearny Street in the Barbary Coast area of San Francisco. A couple of months later he relocated to a more upmarket Brannan Street which was closer to the docks. Australians arriving in San Francisco would often ask about him and have a drink at his premises.

By 1882 he was reportedly bankrupt and homeless owing to an overextended credit to his clientele and an inability to pay his bills. There are numerous reports of his death having occurred in 1882 and that he was buried in a pauper's grave near the Legion of Honor park in San Francisco.

The circumstances of his death are not known with any degree of certainty, due in large part to the loss of records during the 1906 San Francisco earthquake.

There are many rumours about his life there, including a claim that he married a rich American widow and had two sons. Another rumour was that he died in Colorado in 1903. None have been proven.

== Popular culture ==
He was played by John Gavin in the film Frank Gardiner, the King of the Road (1911).

== See also ==
- Gardiner–Hall gang
