= Lost River, New South Wales =

Lost River New South Wales
- Coordinates: 34°27′43″S 149°19′14″E
- Population: 75 (2016 census)
- Postcode(s): 2583
- Elevation: 907 m (2,976 ft)
- Location: 127 km (79 mi) N of Canberra; 255 km (158 mi) SW of Sydney; 16.7 km (10 mi) W of Crookwell; 60 km (37 mi) NW of Goulburn
- LGA(s): Upper Lachlan Shire
- Region: Southern Tablelands
- County: King
- Parish: Romner, Winduella, Crookwell
- State electorate(s): Goulburn
- Federal division(s): Riverina
Localities around Lost River:
Narrawa	Binda	Laggan
Narrawa	Lost River	Crookwell
Bevendale	Wheeo	Grabben Gullen

Lost River is a locality, in the Upper Lachlan Shire, within the Southern Tablelands of New South Wales, Australia. It lies on either side of the main road between Crookwell and Boorawa, which are the nearest towns to it.

The area now known as Lost River lies within the traditional lands of Gundungurra people. These people spoke a similar if not identical language to the neighbouring Ngunnawal people to their south. After settler colonisation, the area became part of the County of King, one of the Nineteen Counties, in which land could be taken up by the colonial settlers.

There is a watercourse by the name of Lost River—a tributary of Wheeo Creek, in the Lachlan River catchment—that bisects the locality, and forms a part of the boundary between the parishes. The naming of the watercourse is unusual, being a 'river' that is a tributary of a creek. It may have been called Lost River, because it flowed "at the bottom of a rocky gorge, about 14 miles from one swamp into another," or it at least seemed to do so, in summer when its flow was low, like a losing stream. The name of the watercourse seems to date from the early 1840s, at latest, and probably earlier. However, the locality name, Lost River, also may have referred to an ancient watercourse, now in an elevated position as a result of geological processes. The ancient sediments of the 'lost river' contained gemstones.

The presence of diamonds and gold in the area was well known by the early 1920s. Diamonds were mined at the Lost River Diamond Mine, from around late 1924, with full scale mining commencing in mid-1927. Operations appear to have ended by late 1928, when the company—set up in 1925-1926 to take over from the earlier mining syndicate—started the process of voluntary liquidation. The first directors of the company were business people from the region, including three jewellers, and a sapphire mine owner from near Inverell. One of the members of the earlier mining syndicate was a former Prime Minister of Australia, Chris Watson.

Some sources state explicitly that the mine was on a bank of the Lost River, with the paydirt being ancient sediments lying under a basalt capping (a 'deep lead' deposit) The owner of the land, upon which the mining leases were taken out, was T.J. McCormack. He had land on the right bank of Lost River, in the Parish of Romner.

Another source states that 'Lost River' mine was not on, or even very near, the watercourse known as Lost River, but that the mine was located, further north in the locality, on a bank of Wheeo Creek. Alternative names given for this mine (Spring Creek Mine, Potten Creek Mine and Wheeo Creek Mine) suggest that it lay between the confluences of the other two watercourses with Wheeo Creek. However, it is possibly referring to another mine, as the evidence is stronger that the Lost River Diamond Mine indeed lay on Lost River.

Ancient sediments were mined by shaft and open-cut methods and then processed by sluicing, using water from the creek at the base of the hill, and then by gravity separation on two shaking screens. As well as diamonds, some gold was recovered, and the deposit was also said to contain sapphire, olivine, and ruby.

There was a school there, over most of the period from August 1873 to September 1936. The school was no longer called Lost River, from June 1931, when it became known as Wheeo North.

The area has been a predominantly agricultural area, from the 1840s, and the main industry of the locality remains grazing of livestock.
