= Biala, New South Wales =

Biala
- Town
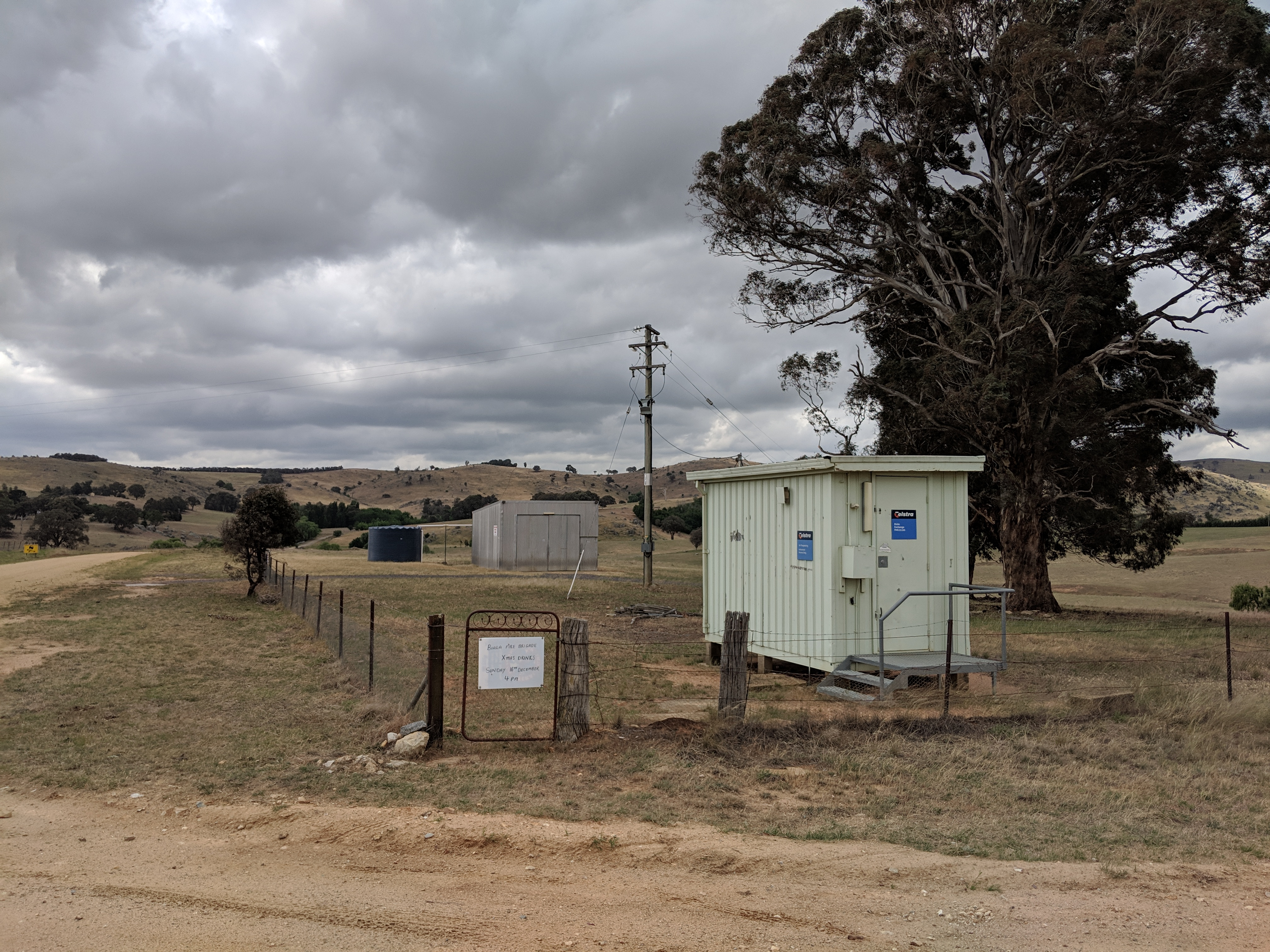
- Biala Telephone exchange and bush fire station

- Coordinates: 34°35′43″S 149°15′43″E
- Country: Australia
- State: New South Wales
- Region: Southern Tablelands
- LGA: Upper Lachlan Shire
- Location: 95 km (59 mi) N of Canberra; 27 km (17 mi) NW of Gunning; 38 km (24 mi) SW of Crookwell; 265 km (165 mi) SW of Sydney

Government
  - State electorate: Goulburn
  - Federal division: Riverina
- Elevation: 636 m (2,087 ft)

Population
  - Total: 84 (SAL 2021)
- Postcode: 2581
- County: King
- Parish: Biala
Localities around Biala
Narrawa	Wheeo	Grabben Gullen
Bevendale	Biala	Gurrundah
Blakney Creek	Merrill	Gurrundah

Biala is a locality in the Upper Lachlan Shire, New South Wales, Australia. It lies about 27 km northwest of Gunning and 95 km north of Canberra. At the 2016 census, it had a population of 59.
