= Argyle Liberal and District Recorder =

Australian newspaper

The Argyle Liberal and District Recorder was an English language newspaper published two times per week, on Tuesdays and Fridays, in Crookwell, New South Wales, Australia.

== History ==
The Argyle Liberal first appeared on Tuesday 13 October 1903 and its four-page edition boasted the largest circulation in the district, "throughout the areas of Taralga, Golspie, Irishtown, Laggan, Fullerton, Tuena, Junction Point, Pejar, Bigga, Binda, Wheeo, Narrawa, Gurrundah, Grabben Gullen, Kialla, Woodhouselee and other centres". The paper operated out of a small office next to the Criterion Hotel in Goulburn Street, Crookwell, with the business registered as The Argyle Liberal printing works.

The Liberal's stated editorial policy indicated it was to be a "free and independent journal in the interests of producers ... touching pastoral, agricultural, mining and social matters".

By 1907, between 400 and 500 copies of each issue were being published: a significant circulation for a country newspaper of the time. It continued for a further 23 years, with publication having ceased by October 1930, primarily as a result of the Great Depression in Australia.

== The Editors ==
The first proprietors of the Argyle Liberal were William James Smith and Laurence Patrick Francis Gilmartin. Laurence (also known as Patrick) Gilmartin was a staunch supporter of the labour movement. He was selected as candidate and representative for the NSW Political Labour League in 1907, and in the same year took over from partner WJ Smith as sole operator of the Liberal. He went on to contest the Wollondilly seat at the NSW State elections in 1909.

On 18 October 1909, Gilmartin fell victim to a violent assault near his home in Crookwell, and subsequently died of complications from the injuries he received. Originally charged with Gilmartin's murder, his assailant, Christopher Stephenson, was convicted of the lesser charge of manslaughter Gilmartin was buried in Crookwell's Roman Catholic Cemetery after a funeral which drew a cortege of "over a mile of vehicles following the body to the graveside" and during which "all the business houses closed from 11 to 12 o'clock".

Following Gilmartin's death, his mother, Mary Ann, took over operation of The Argyle Liberal. She remained as editor and proprietor for 18 years, until January 1927, when she relinquished control to Mr WJ Morton due to ill health. Mary Ann died on 3 October 1927, aged 72.

In early 1930, The Liberal was being produced for Morton by AJ Lucas, however publication ceased entirely sometime between March and October of that year.

== Digitisation ==
The paper has been digitised as part of the Australian Newspapers Digitisation Program project hosted by the National Library of Australia.

== See also ==
- List of newspapers in Australia
- List of newspapers in New South Wales
