= Wheeo =

Wheeo New South Wales
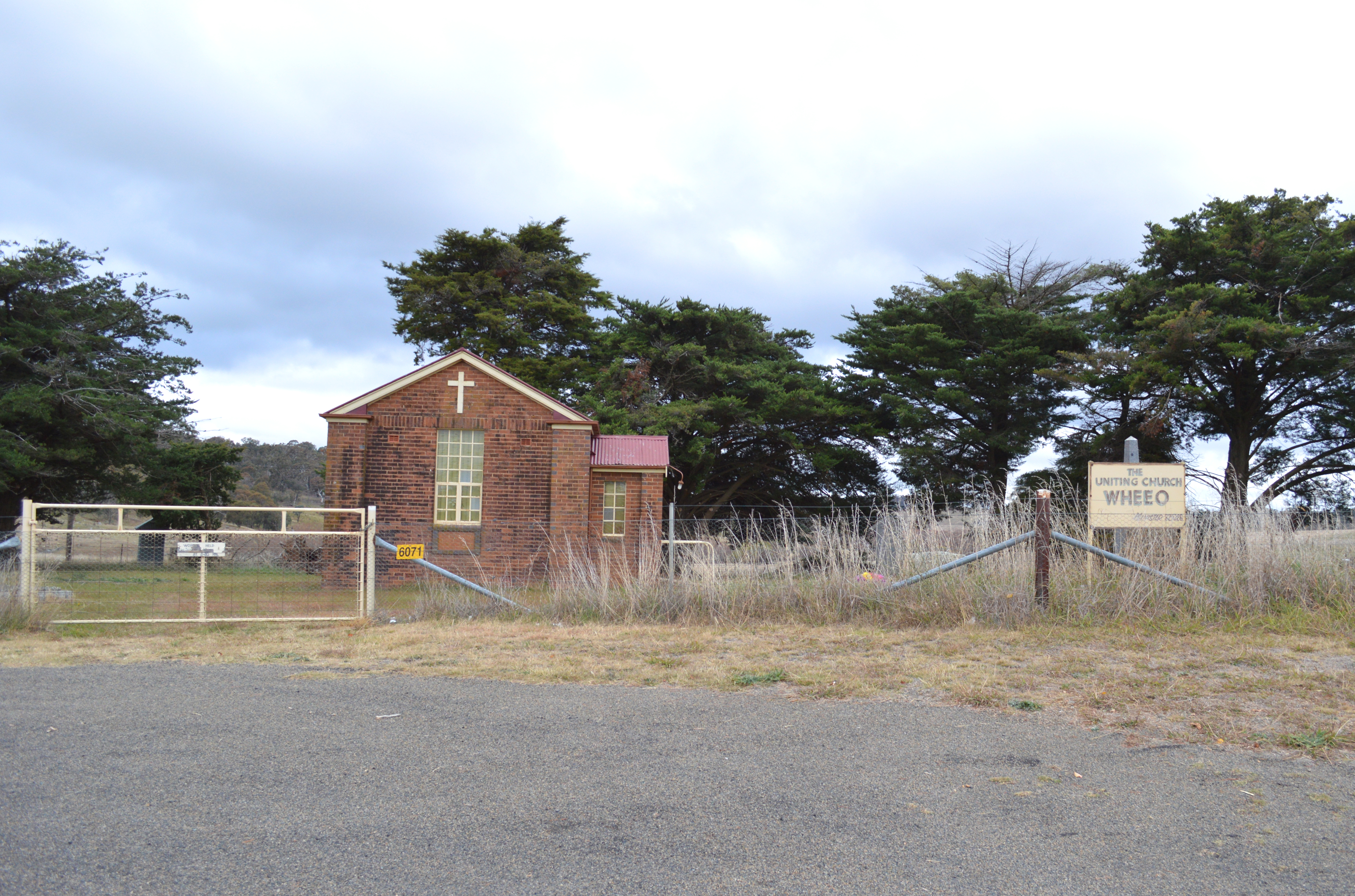
- Uniting church at Wheeo

- Coordinates: 34°26′36″S 149°16′4″E
- Population: 68 (SAL 2021)
- Postcode(s): 2583
- Elevation: 860 m (2,822 ft)
- Location: 261 km (162 mi) SW of Sydney; 64 km (40 mi) NW of Goulburn; 23 km (14 mi) W of Crookwell; 42 km (26 mi) N of Gunning
- LGA(s): Upper Lachlan Shire
- State electorate(s): Goulburn
- Federal division(s): Riverina
Localities around Wheeo:
Narrawa	Lost River	Lost River
Narrawa	Wheeo	Grabben Gullen
Biala	Biala	Gurrundah

Wheeo is a locality in the Southern Tablelands region of New South Wales, Australia. The locality is in the Upper Lachlan Shire, 261 kilometres (162 mi) south west of the state capital, Sydney.

At the 2016 census, Wheeo had a population of 77.
