= Parish of Narrawa =

Narrawa, New South Wales is a civil parish of King County, New South Wales. ).

Narrawa is on the Lachlan River between Rugby and Crookwell, New South Wales.
