= Crookwell Gazette =

Australian regional newspaper

Crookwell Gazette, front page, 23 October 1885

The Crookwell Gazette is an English language newspaper published in Crookwell, New South Wales, Australia. It was first published in 1885 and was also known as "The Crookwell Gazette and Binda, Golspie, Cullen, Laggan, Peelwool, Taralga, Tuena and Wheeo Advertiser", and as "The Crookwell Gazette and Settlers' Advocate". Some issues of the paper have been digitised as part of the Australian Newspapers Digitisation Program of the National Library of Australia.

== Newspaper history ==
The first edition of the paper was circulated on 3 October 1885 by proprietor W. H. Oram. Robert Howland took over as proprietor in 1890, a position he held until his death in 1902. His son Robert A. Howland was the manager and editor. The paper was subsequently published by Robert John Winning, who also owned the Taralga Echo. Following the death of Robert Winning on 6 December 1933, his son John Robert Winning took over as publisher. In December 1949 the Bradley family assisted Jim Woods in buying the paper from Winning. From 1965 the paper was leased by the Bradley/Woods partnership to Brian Dennis until 1983 when printing and production was transferred to The Queanbeyan Age. On 31 December 1995 the paper was sold to Rural Press Ltd. In December 2006, Fairfax Media announced a takeover of Rural Press. As December 2018, the Crookwell Gazette is published both in print and online by Australian Community Media.

== See also ==
- List of newspapers in New South Wales
- List of newspapers in Australia
