= Parish of Olney (King County) =

Olney Parish, New South Wales is a civil parish of King County, New South Wales.

The parish is at 34°31′54″S 148°52′04″E in the Hilltops Council and the only town in the parish is Rye Park.
