= Parish of Romner =

Romner Parish is a civil parish of King County, New South Wales.

The parish is located at 34°21′54″S 149°18′04″E between Binda north of Crookwell and Rugby.
