= Parish of Rabnor =

Rabnor Parish is a civil parish of King County, New South Wales. ).

Rabnor is located on the Lachlan River at 34°28′54″S 149°04′04″E and the only town of the parish is Bevendale.
