= Taralga Echo =

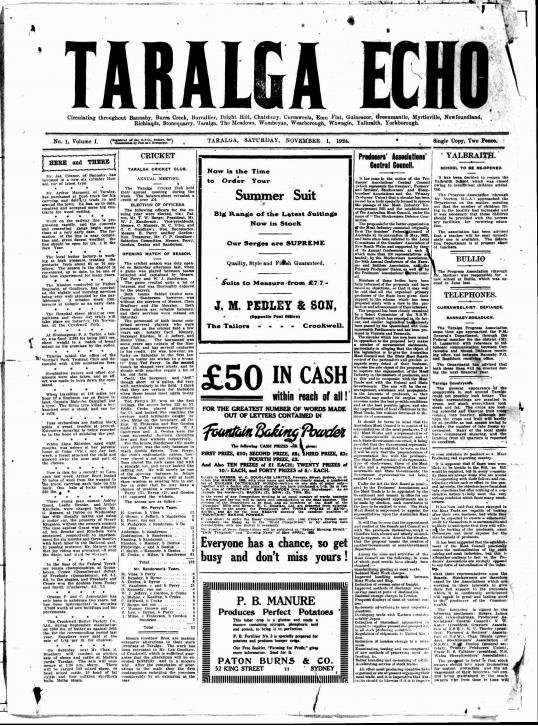
Taralga Echo 1 November 1924

The Taralga Echo was a weekly English-language newspaper published in Crookwell, New South Wales from 1924 to 1927.

== History ==
The first issue of the Taralga Echo appeared on 1 November 1924, published by RJ Winning and Son. Previously, Robert John Winning had been involved in production of The Sydney Morning Herald and The Sydney Mail, then in Cessnock with the Cessnock Express. In Crookwell, and in partnership with his son John, the Winnings published the Crookwell Gazette and the Taralga Echo.

The Echo was begun in 1924 with the specific aim of providing content for a Taralga-based readership. It advertised a circulation throughout the local districts of Bannaby, Burra Creek, Burrallier, Bright Hill, Chatsbury, Curraweela, Emu Flat, Guineacor, Greenmantle, Myrtleville, Newfoundland, Richlands, Stonequarry, Taralga, The Meadows, Wombeyan, Wearborough, Wowagin, Yalbraith and YorkBorough.

In January 1927, an editorial announcement advised that, due to economic necessity, a shared publication arrangement had been agreed to, between the Winnings’ sister papers of the Taralga Echo and the Crookwell Gazette, and rival paper, the Argyle Liberal, produced by WJ Morton.

Publication of an independent Taralga Echo ceased with its final issue on 4 November 1927. Content of interest to Taralga district readers would subsequently be incorporated into a larger-sized Crookwell Gazette.

Following the death of Robert John Winning on 6 Dec 1933, son John continued to publish the Gazette in Crookwell.

== Digitisation ==
The Taralga Echo has been digitised as part of the Australian Newspapers Digitisation Program hosted by the National Library of Australia.

== See also ==
- List of newspapers in New South Wales
- List of newspapers in Australia

== Bibliography ==
- Holden, W Sprague 1961, Australia goes to press, Melbourne University Press, Melbourne.
- Mayer, Henry 1964, The press in Australia, Lansdowne Press, Melbourne.
