= Rye Park =

Rye Park may refer to:

== Places ==
=== Australia ===
- Rye Park, New South Wales, a town in the Southern Tablelands region of New South Wales

=== United Kingdom ===
- Rye Park, Hertfordshire, the name of a borough council ward representing part of Hoddesdon
