= Parish of Winduella =

Winduella Parish is a civil parish of King County, New South Wales.

The parish is in Upper Lachlan Shire located at 34°29′54″S 149°18′04″E, and the only town of the parish is the Hamlet of Wheeo, with a population of 77.
