= Parish of Biala =

Biala, New South Wales is a civil parish of King County, New South Wales.

The parish is located at 34°34′54″S 149°13′04″E, on Lampton Creek and Grabben Gullen Creeks between Crookwell and Gunning.
