= Grabben Gullen =

Grabben Gullen New South Wales
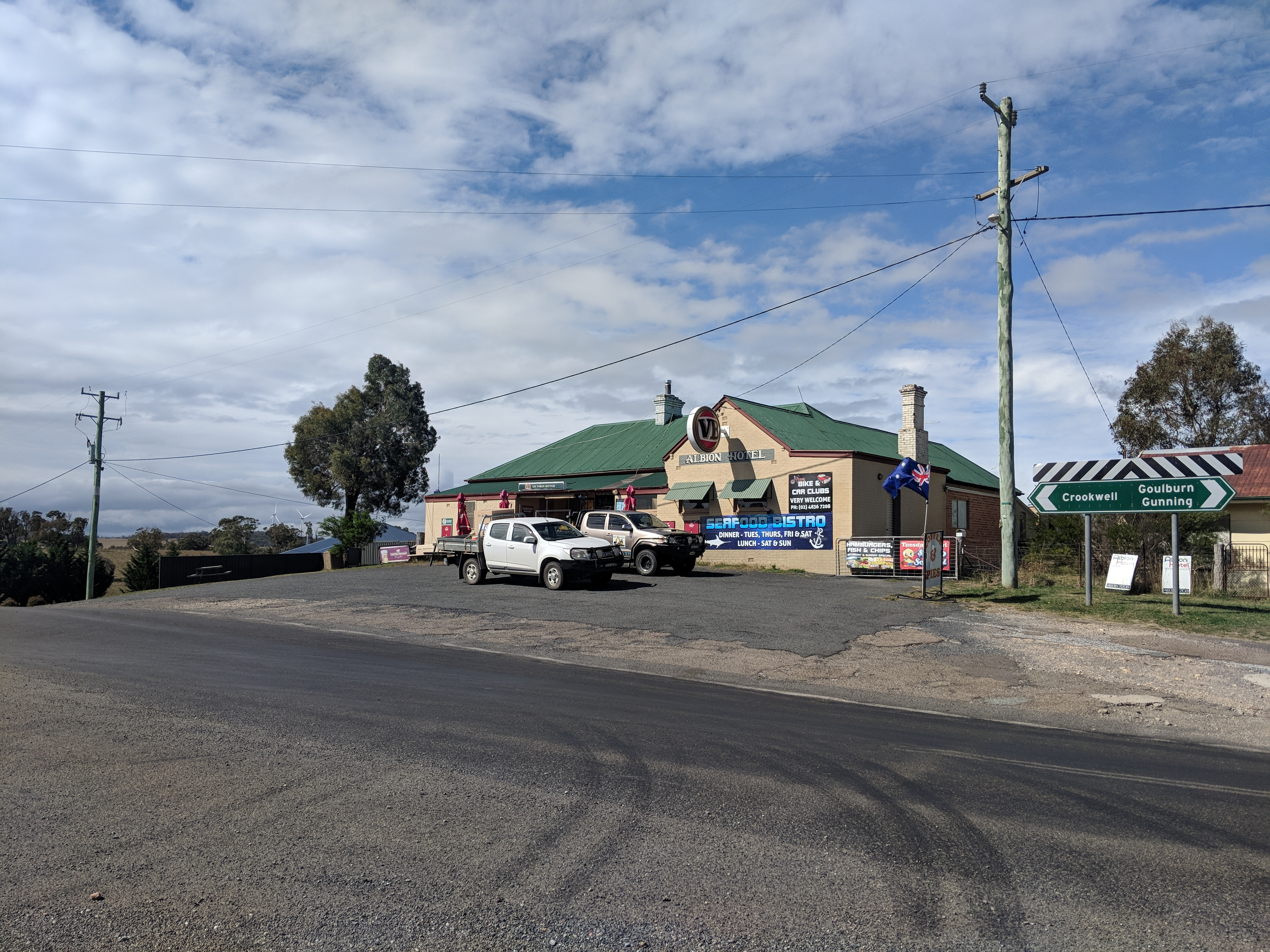
- Grabben Gullen pub

- Coordinates: 34°31′50″S 149°23′17″E
- Population: 248 (SAL 2021)
- Elevation: 898 m (2,946 ft)
- Location: 14 km (9 mi) SW of Crookwell; 34 km (21 mi) NNE of Gunning; 101 km (63 mi) NNE of Canberra; 43 km (27 mi) NW of Goulburn; 238 km (148 mi) SW of Sydney
- LGA(s): Upper Lachlan Shire
- Region: Southern Tablelands
- County: King
- Parish: Grabben Gullen
- State electorate(s): Goulburn
- Federal division(s): Riverina
Localities around Grabben Gullen:
Lost River	Crookwell	Crookwell
Wheeo	Grabben Gullen	Pejar
Biala	Gurrundah	Bannister

Grabben Gullen is a small village in Upper Lachlan Shire, New South Wales, Australia. At the 2016 census, it had a population of 253. It is located between Crookwell and Gunning, situated at an elevation of 898 metres above sea level; several snowfalls occur during the winter months.

The town is regularly visited by fossickers, seeking sapphires, garnets, zircons and gold. Its name is derived from an Aboriginal term meaning "small waters", and was chosen due to the numerous small streams in the area, which feed into the Lachlan River.

Built in the early 1800s, Grabben Gullen hosts St Mary's Catholic Church, a post office opened on 16 December 1891, and a pub named The Albion. The church is of gothic style. Designed by an architect named Mr. Gordon in historical records, it lies approximately 4.5 kilometres from the village centre and celebrated its 150th anniversary in 2013.

Grabben Gullen is now a tourist attraction in the Upper Lachlan region, and hosts a monthly produce market.

== History ==
In November 1869 the Goulburn Herald and Chronicle reported that the residents of Grabben Gullen had signed and adopted a petition. For nine months the residents received no response, and the matter was set aside for about three months. At the expiration of that time an answer was received that a police station would be established.

In 1896 the Goulburn Evening Penny Post reported that the inhabitants of Grabben Gullen were again signing a petition for a police station to be established there.
