= Gurrundah =

- Town
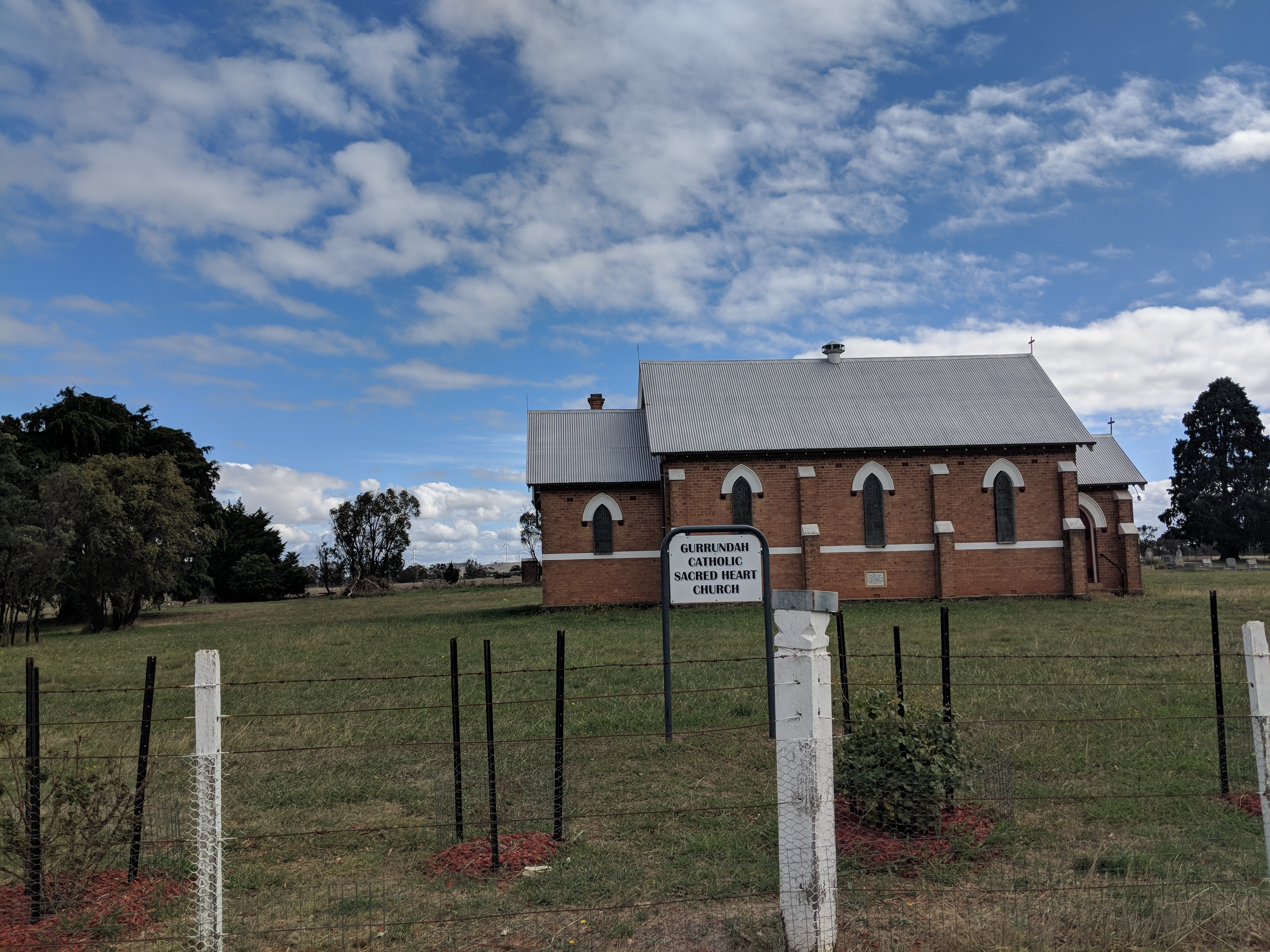
- Church in Gurrundah

- Coordinates: 34°39′42″S 149°24′22″E
- Country: Australia
- State: New South Wales
- Region: Southern Tablelands
- LGA: Upper Lachlan Shire
- Location: 26 km (16 mi) N of Gunning; 22 km (14 mi) S of Crookwell; 93 km (58 mi) N of Canberra; 34 km (21 mi) WNW of Goulburn; 239 km (149 mi) SW of Sydney

Government
  - State electorate: Goulburn
  - Federal division: Riverina
- Elevation: 838 m (2,749 ft)

Population
  - Total: 80 (SAL 2021)
- Postcode: 2581
- County: King
- Parish: Lampton
Localities around Gurrundah
Biala	Grabben Gullen	Bannister
Merrill	Gurrundah	Pomeroy
Gunning	Cullerin	Breadalbane

Gurrundah is a locality in the Upper Lachlan Shire, New South Wales, Australia. It lies on the eastern side of the Crookwell–Gunning road about 22 km south of Crookwell and 26 km north of Gunning. At the 2016 census, it had a population of 55. The Gullen Range Wind Farm lies in the east of the locality above the upper Wollondilly River.
