= Parish of Numby =

Numby, New South Wales is a civil parish of King County, New South Wales.

The parish is at 34°08′54″S 148°58′04″E on the Lachlan River, near Bigga.
