= Narrawa =

Narrawa New South Wales
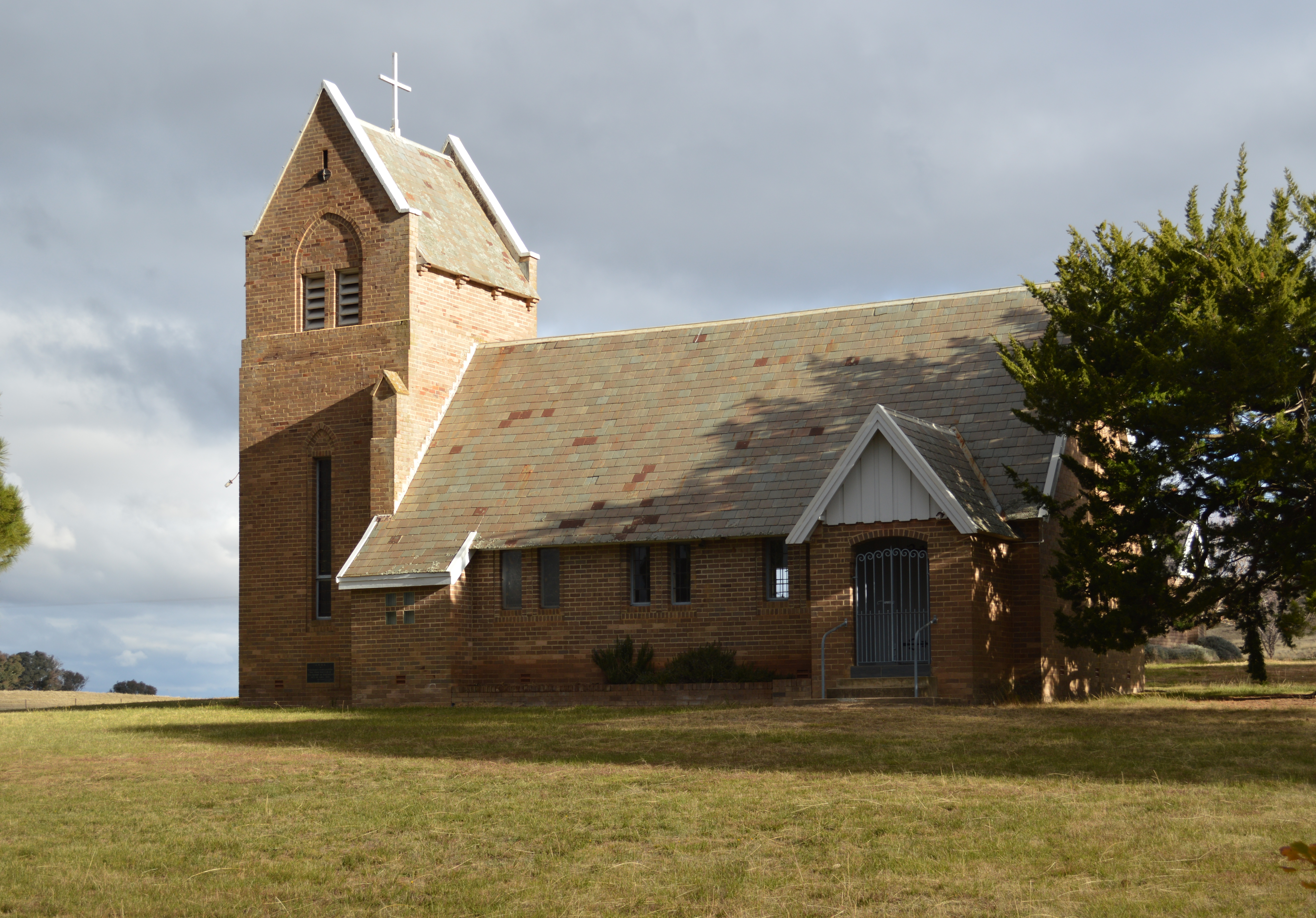
- St Barnabas' Anglican church at Narrawa

- Coordinates: 34°26′08″S 149°09′34″E
- Population: 112 (SAL 2021)
- Postcode(s): 2583
- Elevation: 462 m (1,516 ft)
- Location: 272 km (169 mi) SW of Sydney; 75 km (47 mi) NW of Goulburn; 34 km (21 mi) W of Crookwell
- LGA(s): Upper Lachlan Shire
- State electorate(s): Goulburn
- Federal division(s): Riverina
Localities around Narrawa:
| Taylors Flat | Binda | Binda |
| Rugby | Narrawa | Lost River |
| Bevendale | Biala | Biala |

Narrawa is a locality in western New South Wales, Australia. The locality is in the Upper Lachlan Shire, 272 kilometres (169 mi) south west of the state capital, Sydney.

At the 2016 census, Narrawa had a population of 86.
