= Pudman Creek =

Pudman Pudmans
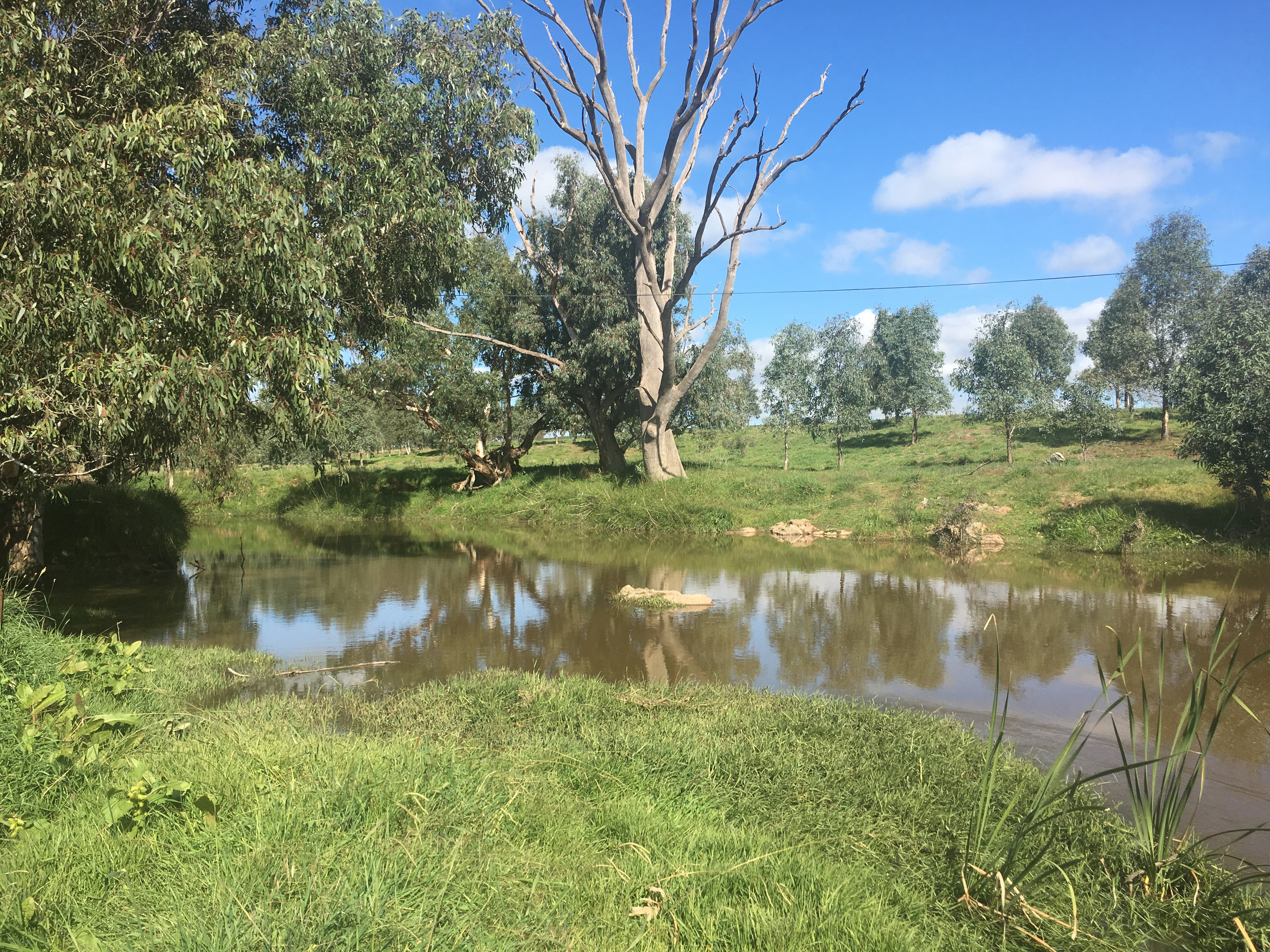

- Location of the Pudman Creek mouth in New South Wales

Location
- Country: Australia
- State: New South Wales
- Region: South Western Slopes (IBRA), South West Slopes
- LGA: Hilltops

Physical characteristics
- Source: Great Dividing Range
  - location: north of Yass
  - coordinates: 34°39′30″S 148°58′10″E
  - elevation: 659 m (2,162 ft)
- Mouth: Boorowa River
  - location: east of Boorowa
  - coordinates: 34°25′46″S 148°46′30″E
  - elevation: 464 m (1,522 ft)
- Length: 39 km (24 mi)

Basin features
- River system: Lachlan sub–catchment, Murray–Darling basin

The Pudman Creek, a perennial stream that is part of the Lachlan sub-catchment of the Murrumbidgee catchment within the Murray–Darling basin, is located in the South West Slopes region of New South Wales, Australia.

== Course and features ==
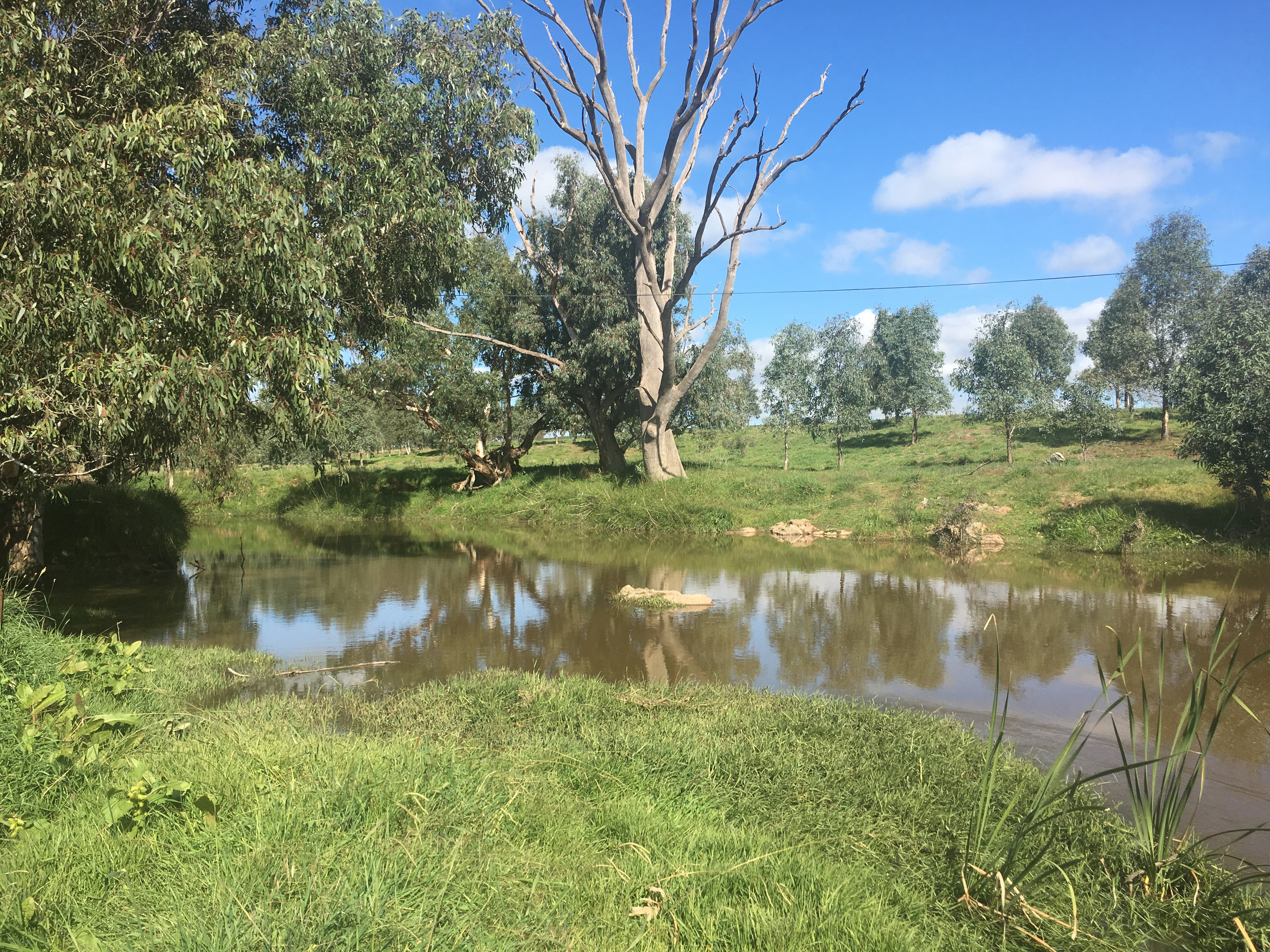
Pudman Creek near the Pudman Creek crossing on Kennys Creek Road after significant rain

The Pudman Creek (technically a river) rises approximately 21 kilometres (13 mi) north of Yass, sourced by runoff from the Great Dividing Range. The creek flows generally north by west, then northwest, before reaching its confluence with the Boorowa River, itself a tributary of the Lachlan River, east of Boorowa. The creek descends 195 metres (640 ft) over its 39-kilometre (24 mi) course.

== See also ==
- List of rivers of New South Wales (L-Z)
- Rivers of New South Wales
