= Rye Park, New South Wales =

Rye Park New South Wales
- Coordinates: 34°30′57″S 148°55′02″E
- Population: 230 (SAL 2021)
- Postcode(s): 2586
- Elevation: 544 m (1,785 ft)
- Location: 305 km (190 mi) SW of Sydney; 107 km (66 mi) N of Canberra; 41 km (25 mi) N of Yass; 67 km (42 mi) E of Young
- LGA(s): Hilltops Council
- State electorate(s): Goulburn
- Federal division(s): Riverina
Localities around Rye Park:
Boorowa	Rugby	Narrawa
Boorowa	Rye Park	Bevendale
Kangiara	Laverstock	Blakney Creek

Rye Park is a town in the Southern Tablelands region of New South Wales, Australia. The town is in the Hilltops Council local government area, 305 kilometres (190 mi) south west of the state capital, Sydney and 107 kilometres (66 mi) north of the national capital, Canberra.

Rye Park is situated on the Pudman Creek, which is a pristine waterway inhabited by platypus, turtles, frogs and the endangered Pigmy Perch.

The area was first settled by Europeans in the 1840s to farm the land. There have been periods of mining for silver and tin but today the town is involved in production of wool and meat.

Evidence of the village's early settlers can still be found. Hamilton Hume’s family settled in the area in 1865. Their homestead remains relatively unchanged from its original construction and it is still a privately owned working sheep property.

Rye Park has had a school since 1876.

At the 2016 census, Rye Park had a population of 258, which had dropped to 230 at the 2021 census.
