= Boorowa River =

Coordinates: 33°57′S 148°50′E

Boorowa
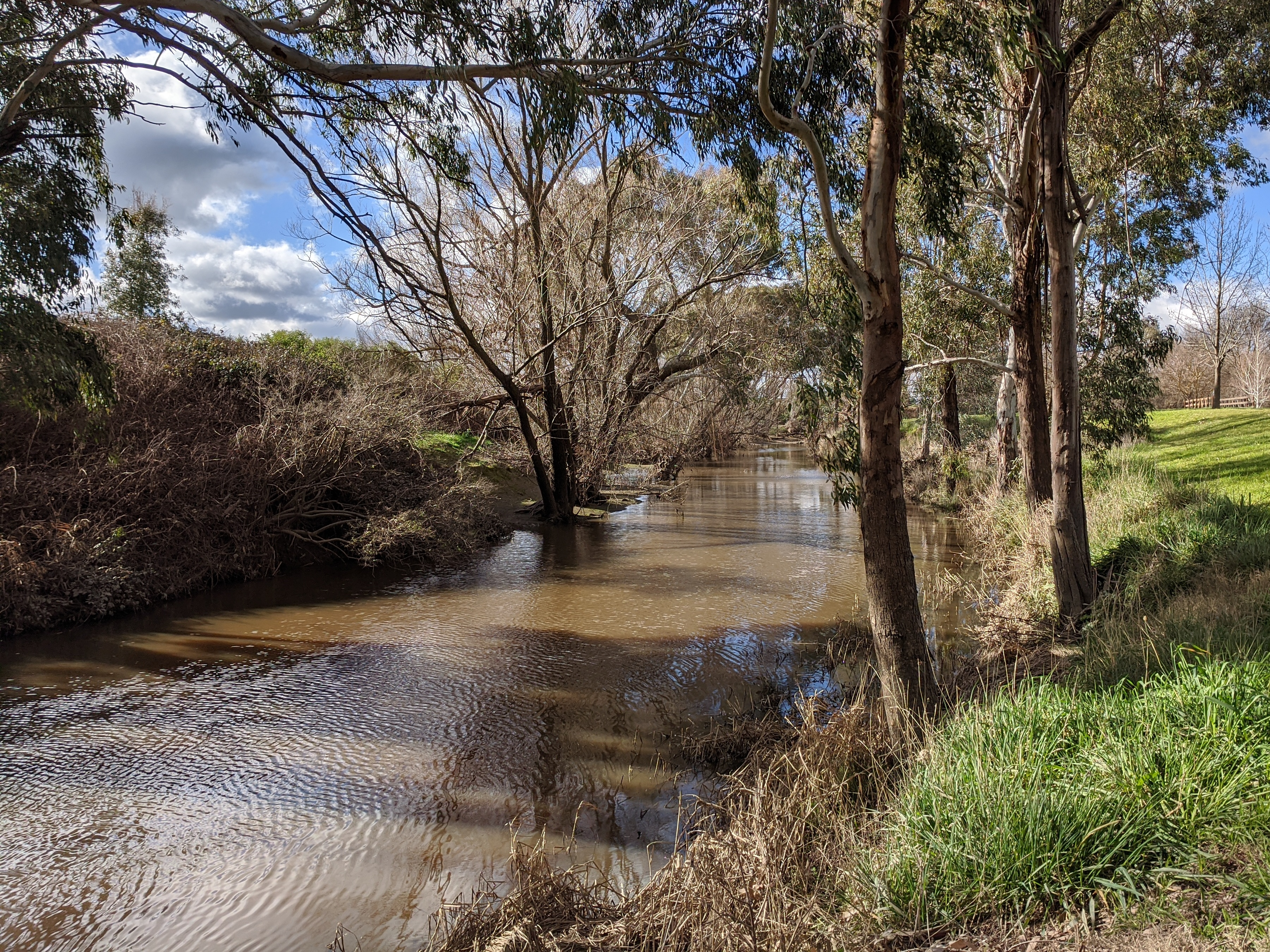
- The Boorowa River passing through Boorowa
- Etymology: Aboriginal: Wiradjuri for kangaroo; fish hawks

Location
- Country: Australia
- State: New South Wales
- Region: IBRA: South Eastern Highlands
- District: Southern Tablelands, Central West
- Municipalities: Yass Valley, Boorowa, Upper Lachlan

Physical characteristics
- Source
  - location: north of Yass
  - elevation: 619 m (2,031 ft)
- Mouth: Lachlan River
  - location: south–east of Cowra
  - elevation: 301 m (988 ft)
- Length: 134 km (83 mi)

Basin features
- River system: Murray–Darling basin
- Tributaries
  - left: Breakfast Creek (Boorowa, New South Wales)
  - right: Pudman Creek

Boorowa River, a perennial stream that is part of the Lachlan catchment within the Murray–Darling basin, is located in the central–western region of New South Wales, Australia.

== Location and features ==
The river rises about 16 kilometres (9.9 mi) north of Yass and flows generally north, joined by two minor tributaries, before reaching its confluence with the Lachlan River about 18 kilometres (11 mi) south–east of Cowra; dropping 318 metres (1,043 ft) over its course of 134 kilometres (83 mi).

The river flows through the town of Boorowa, from where it draws its name, an Aboriginal Wiradjuri word for kangaroo.

== See also ==
- List of rivers of Australia § New South Wales
