= King County, New South Wales =

King
- Cadastral division
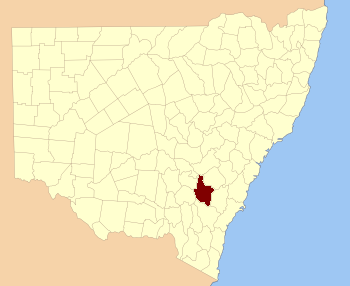
- Location in New South Wales
- Country: Australia
- State: New South Wales
Lands administrative divisions around King
Forbes	Bathurst	Georgiana
Monteagle	King	Argyle
Harden	Murray	Argyle

King County was one of the original Nineteen Counties in New South Wales and is now one of the 141 cadastral divisions of New South Wales. It is in the area to the east of Yass. The northern part of it lies between the Lachlan River and the Boorowa River, including the locations of Frogmore, Taylors Flat, Gunnary, Rugby and Rye Park. The Crookwell River is also part of the northern boundary. The Yass River is the southern boundary.

King County was named in honour of Governor Philip Gidley King (1758–1808).

== Parishes within this county ==
A full list of parishes found within this county; their current LGA and mapping coordinates to the approximate centre of each location is as follows:

Parish	LGA	Coordinates
Alton	Boorowa Council	34°13′54″S 148°51′04″E
Bala	Boorowa Council	34°18′54″S 148°51′04″E
Bango	Upper Lachlan Shire	34°43′54″S 148°58′04″E
Barnett	Boorowa Council	34°19′54″S 148°58′04″E
Biala	Upper Lachlan Shire	34°34′54″S 149°13′04″E
Blakney	Upper Lachlan Shire	34°39′54″S 148°58′04″E
Boorowa	Boorowa Council	34°28′54″S 148°45′04″E
Bramah	Boorowa Council	34°15′54″S 149°02′04″E
Bunton	Upper Lachlan Shire	34°41′54″S 149°06′04″E
Crookwell	Upper Lachlan Shire	34°25′54″S 149°25′04″E
Crosby	Boorowa Council	34°38′54″S 148°52′04″E
Cullarin	Upper Lachlan Shire	34°48′54″S 149°21′04″E
Dalton	Upper Lachlan Shire	34°42′54″S 149°12′04″E
Derringullen	Yass Valley Council	34°42′54″S 148°53′04″E
Dixon	Upper Lachlan Shire	34°50′54″S 149°13′04″E
Garway	Upper Lachlan Shire	34°39′54″S 149°15′04″E
Grabben Gullen	Upper Lachlan Shire	34°30′54″S 149°25′04″E
Graham	Boorowa Council	34°07′54″S 148°55′04″E
Gunnary	Boorowa Council	34°23′54″S 148°49′04″E
Gunning	Upper Lachlan Shire	34°46′54″S 149°16′04″E
Hovell	Boorowa Council	34°13′54″S 148°57′04″E
Jerrara	Upper Lachlan Shire	34°28′54″S 149°11′04″E
Jerrawa	Upper Lachlan Shire	34°45′54″S 149°05′04″E
Kember	Boorowa Council	34°01′54″S 148°51′04″E
Kenyu	Boorowa Council	34°07′54″S 148°50′04″E
Kildare	Upper Lachlan Shire	34°36′54″S 149°07′04″E
Lampton	Upper Lachlan Shire	34°36′54″S 149°21′04″E
Lerida	Upper Lachlan Shire	34°52′54″S 149°20′04″E
Manton	Yass Valley Council	34°49′54″S 148°59′04″E
Merrill	Upper Lachlan Shire	34°41′54″S 149°20′04″E
Mundoonen	Upper Lachlan Shire	34°52′54″S 149°08′04″E
Narrawa	Upper Lachlan Shire	34°21′54″S 149°09′04″E
Nelanglo	Yass Valley Council	34°56′54″S 149°17′04″E
Newham	Boorowa Council	34°02′54″S 148°55′04″E
Numby	Boorowa Council	34°08′54″S 148°58′04″E
Olney	Boorowa Council	34°31′54″S 148°52′04″E
Opton	Boorowa Council	34°32′54″S 148°57′04″E
Preston	Upper Lachlan Shire	34°33′54″S 149°05′04″E
Rabnor	Upper Lachlan Shire	34°28′54″S 149°04′04″E
Romner	Upper Lachlan Shire	34°21′54″S 149°18′04″E
Rugby	Boorowa Council	34°25′54″S 149°00′04″E
Taunton	Boorowa Council	34°33′54″S 148°45′04″E
Wallah	Boorowa Council	34°21′54″S 149°03′04″E
Ware	Boorowa Council	34°25′54″S 148°54′04″E
Wheeo	Upper Lachlan Shire	34°23′54″S 149°13′04″E
Winduella	Upper Lachlan Shire	34°29′54″S 149°18′04″E
Wyangala	Boorowa Council	34°02′54″S 148°59′04″E
Yass	Yass Valley Council	34°47′54″S 148°54′04″E
