= Bevendale, New South Wales =

Bevendale
- Town
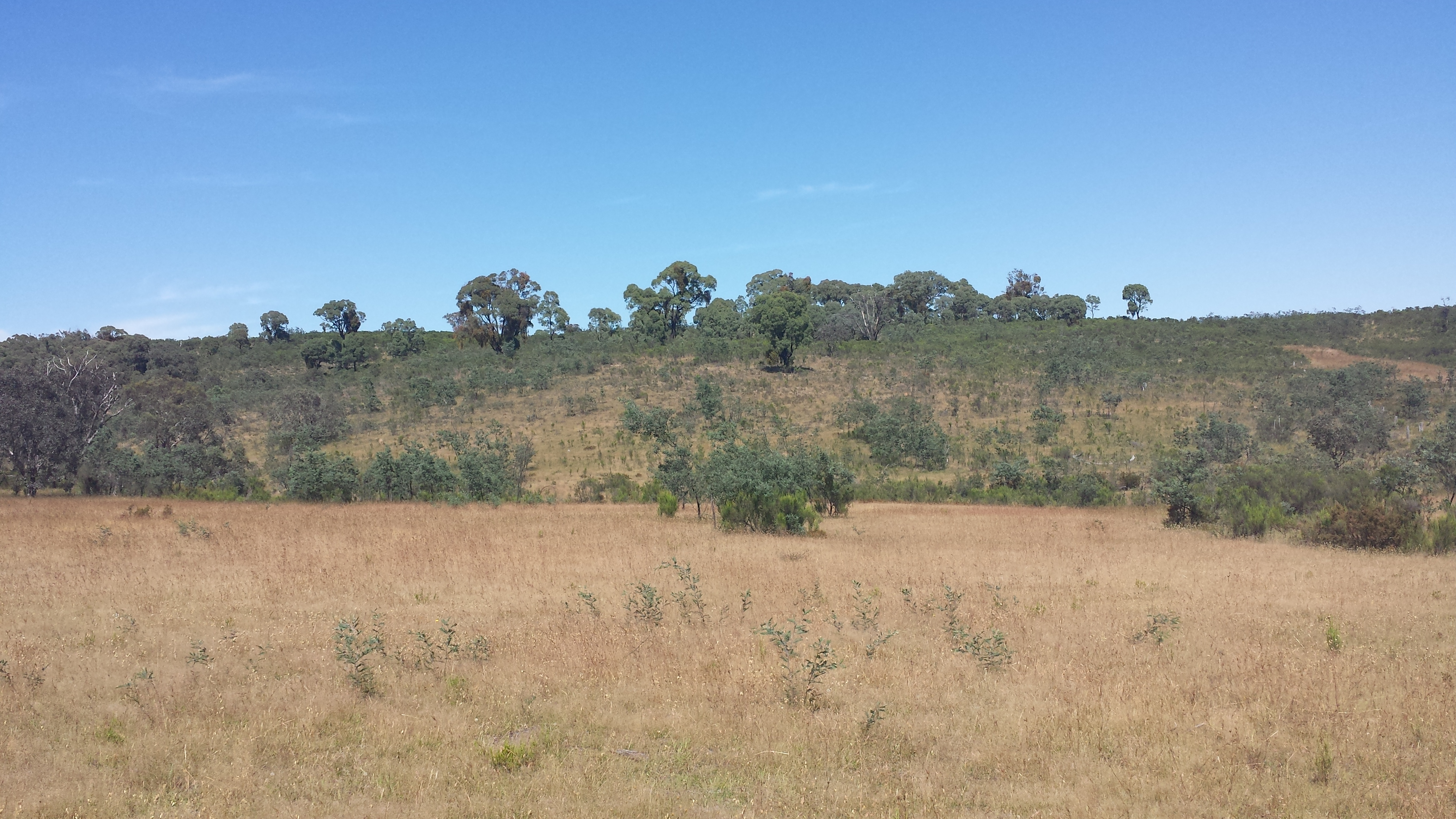
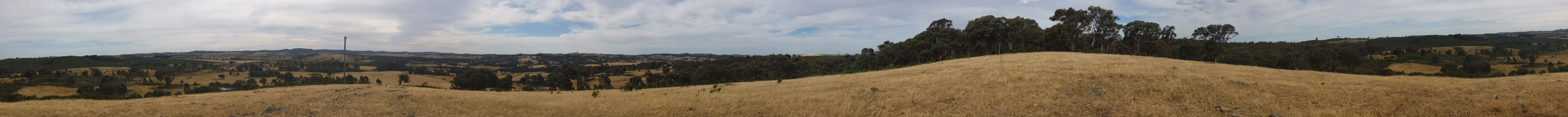
- Location shot of the area typical to Bevendale Panorama of the area typical to Bevendale

- Coordinates: 34°32′S 149°07′E
- Country: Australia
- State: New South Wales
- LGA: Upper Lachlan Shire
- Location: 40 km (25 mi) N of Gunning; 85 km (53 mi) NW of Goulburn; 100 km (62 mi) N of Canberra; 280 km (170 mi) SW of Sydney

Government
  - State electorate: Burrinjuck
  - Federal division: Riverina
- Elevation: 505 m (1,657 ft)

Population
  - Total: 3 (2014) (Note: The sign on the entrance into the main "centre" of Bevendale states 3 people, with 224 reported living in the general Bevendale area at the 2011 census.)
- Postcode: 2581
Localities around Bevendale
Rugby	Rugby	Narrawa
Rye Park	Bevendale	Biala
Rye Park	Blakney Creek	Merrill

Bevendale is a rural town located in the Southern Tablelands in New South Wales, Australia. It is 25 km (16 mi) north of Dalton and is located in the Upper Lachlan Shire. The Hume Highway passes through the south of Bevendale.

Bevendale is a small rural town with only a population of three people, with 224 living in the general Bevendale area at the 2011 census. The area has little to no cellular phone reception. Dalton is the nearest service town, with residents also heading to Gunning to trade in the markets there.

== See also ==
- Gunning
- Dalton
- Goulburn
- Yass
