= Rugby, New South Wales =

Rugby
- Town
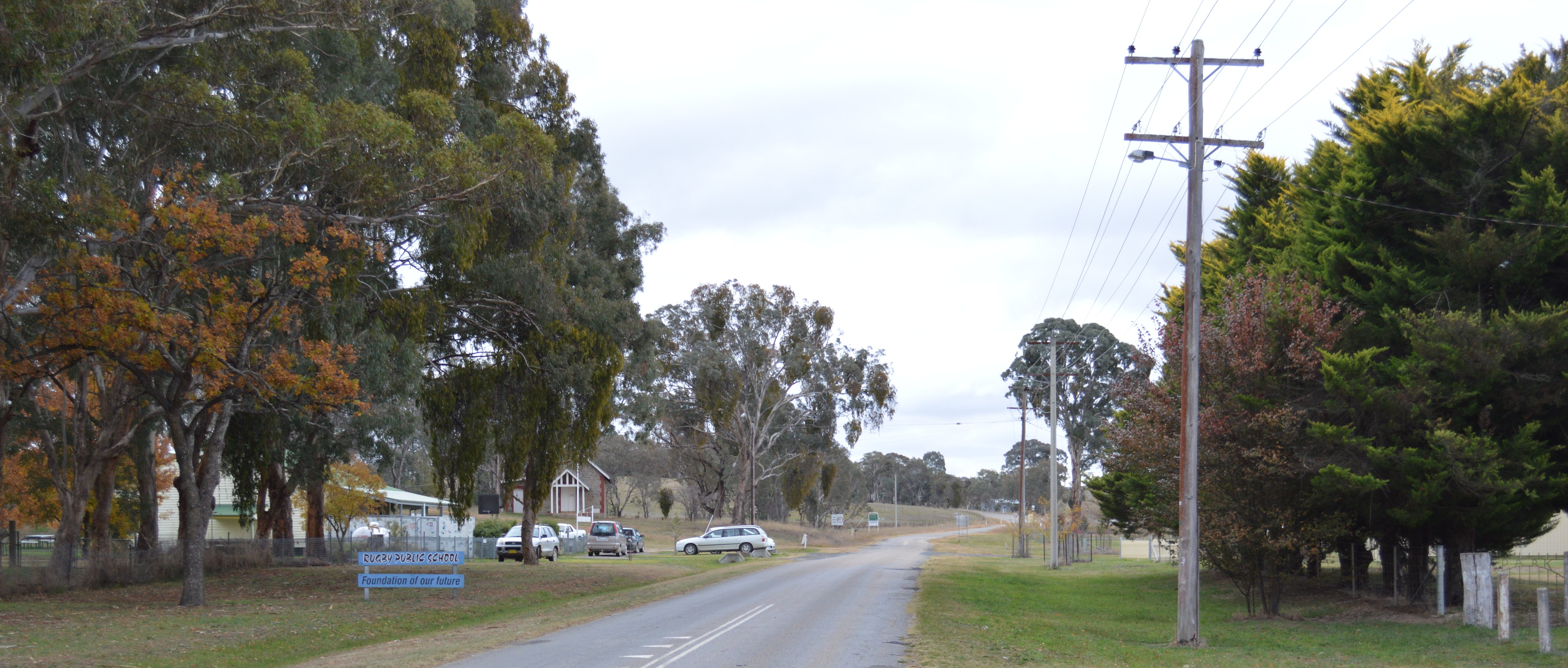
- Narrawa Road, the main street of Rugby

- Coordinates: 34°24′0″S 148°59′0″E
- Country: Australia
- State: New South Wales
- LGA: Hilltops Council
- Location: 292 km (181 mi) SW of Sydney; 142 km (88 mi) N of Canberra; 59 km (37 mi) N of Yass; 80 km (50 mi) E of Young

Government
  - State electorate: Goulburn
  - Federal division: Riverina
- Elevation: 574 m (1,883 ft)

Population
  - Total: 83 (SAL 2021)
- Postcode: 2583
Localities around Rugby
Frogmore	Taylors Flat	Binda
Boorowa	Rugby	Narrawa
Boorowa	Rye Park	Bevendale

Rugby is a village in the Southern Tablelands region of New South Wales, Australia. The village is in the Hilltops Council local government area, 292 kilometres (181 mi) south west of the state capital, Sydney, and 146 kilometres (91 mi) north of the national capital, Canberra.

The village is set in an area of thick scrub and is known for raising merino sheep. The general store and post office have closed; the school, established over 125 years ago, closed in 2018.

The population of Rugby in the 2016 census was 73 and had increased to 83 at the 2021 census.

The village was founded in 1830. It was originally called Mewburn after a local settler family.

The village contains several buildings which are considered to have local heritage significance, including: The Colonial Inn, Rugby General Store, Rugby Police Station (1922–45), the Rugby Homestead, Rugby Public School (1914–2018), the Rugby Hall (1933), the St Vigil (Catholic) & St Aidan (Anglican) churches. The old granite stone Police Station later became the teacher's residence for the school. The cells became bedrooms for the teacher's children.

The Rugby Memorial Gates at the showground are the site of the local ANZAC day commemoration.
