= Crookwell, New South Wales =

Crookwell
- Town
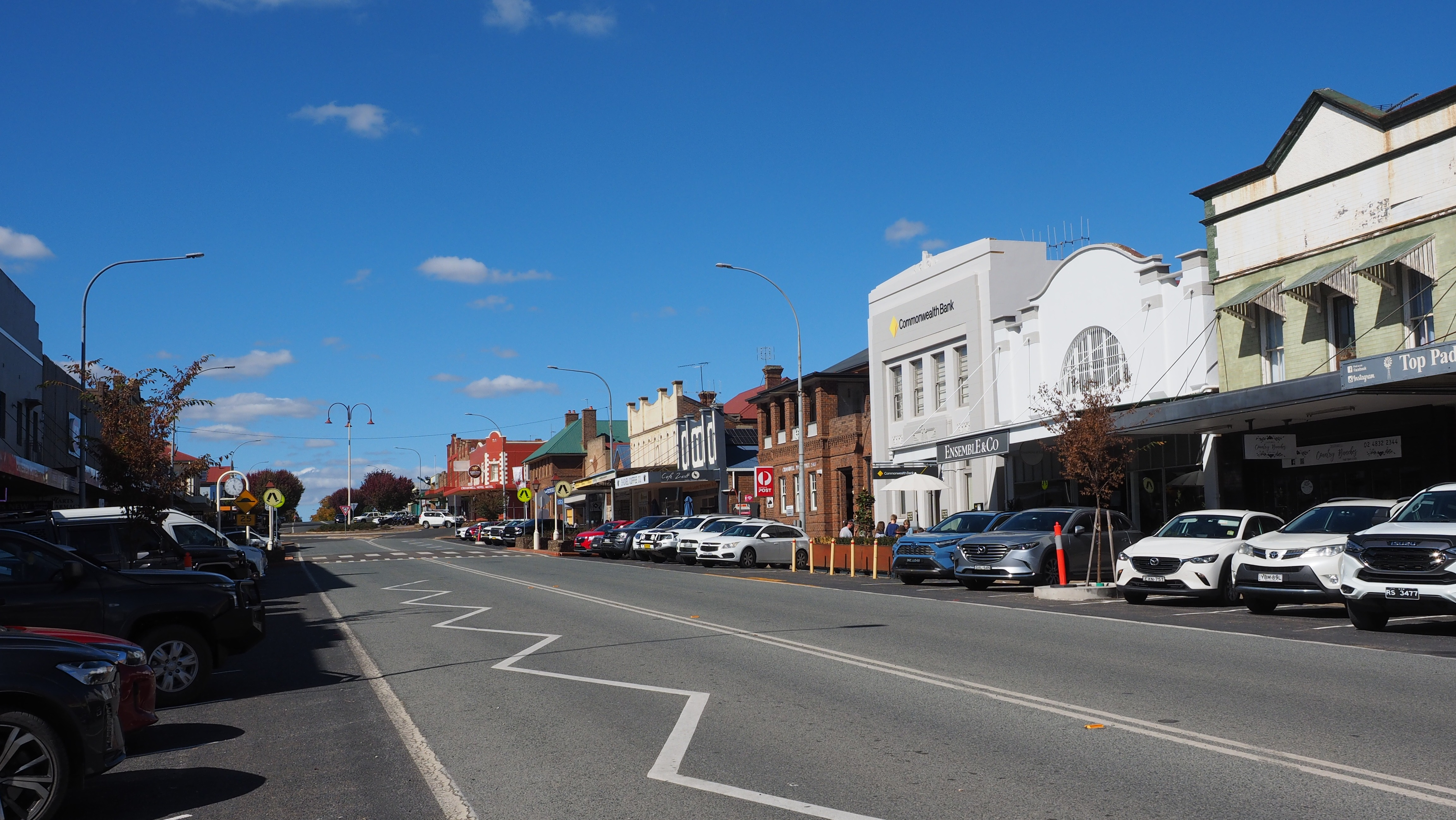
- Goulburn Street in the centre of Crookwell

- Interactive map of Crookwell
- Coordinates: 34°27′29″S 149°28′13″E
- Country: Australia
- State: New South Wales
- Region: Southern Tablelands
- LGA: Upper Lachlan Shire
- Location: 113 km (70 mi) N of Canberra; 173 km (107 mi) SW of Sydney; 45 km (28 mi) NW of Goulburn; 144 km (89 mi) S of Bathurst

Government
  - State electorate: Goulburn
  - Federal division: Riverina
- Elevation: 914 m (2,999 ft)

Population
  - Total: 2,098 (UCL 2021)
- Postcode: 2583
- County: King
- Parish: Crookwell
- Mean max temp: 18.2 °C (64.8 °F)
- Mean min temp: 5.0 °C (41.0 °F)
- Annual rainfall: 863.8 mm (34.01 in)
Localities around Crookwell
Binda	Laggan	Laggan
Lost River	Crookwell	Roslyn
Grabben Gullen	Bannister	Pejar

Crookwell is a small town located in the Southern Tablelands of New South Wales, Australia, in the Upper Lachlan Shire. At the 2016 census, Crookwell had a population of 2,641. The town is at a relatively high altitude of 887 metres and there are several snowfalls during the cooler months. The nearest major centre is the city of Goulburn which is about a half-hour drive to the south-east of the town. Crookwell is easily accessible to the state capital of Sydney and also the federal capital of Canberra.

Most employment is based on rural industries, and the district is renowned for potato farming. Crookwell is also home to what was NSW's first wind farm, which consists of 8 turbines, and is located a few kilometres out of town on the road towards Goulburn.

A railway once connected Goulburn and Crookwell, which opened in 1902, but passenger services to Crookwell station ceased in 1974, and the last goods train ran in 1985. The line is technically not closed, but has been listed as out of use, and in some locations is now impassable.

== History ==
The area now known as Crookwell lies within the traditional lands of the Gundangurra people. These people spoke a similar if not identical language to the neighbouring Ngunnawal people to their south.

The first Europeans known to be in the area were the exploratory party of surveyor James Meehan which camped 1 km south of present-day Grabben Gullen (12 km south-west of Crookwell). John Oxley passed to the north and east later that same year. Crookwell was originally known as "Kiama" but later renamed after the river. The area around Crookwell was first settled in the 1820s, and had received its current name by the 1860s.

By 1840, some inns had appeared at the crossroads, but Binda remained the head of the district. After this, selection of blocks occurred; and the population of was over 100 by midway through that decade. The first allotments were sold at the end of the decade. By the mid-1870s the population had already reached 1000 people.

In 1865, Mary Gilmore was born just 16 km south in the town or Roslyn.

From 1941 to 1945, 508,500 tons of iron ore was mined—about six miles by road from the town—and railed to Port Kembla for wartime steel production.

Crookwell contained one of Australia's first wind farms, the Crookwell Wind Farm and the first wind farm that fed into the national power grid.

== Heritage listings ==
Crookwell has a number of heritage-listed sites, including:

- Goulburn-Crookwell railway: Crookwell railway station

== Population ==
In the 2021 Census, there were 2,686 people in Crookwell. In the 2016 census 85.8% of people were born in Australia and 91.4% of people spoke only English at home. The most common responses for religion were Catholic 34.9%, Anglican 30.1%, No Religion 14.3% and Uniting Church 7.8%.

== Governance ==
Crookwell is the seat of the Upper Lachlan Shire Council local government area (LGA) of New South Wales, Australia, formed in 2004.

== Transport ==
Crookwell is approximately 2.5 hours drive from Sydney via Goulburn, and 1.5 hours from Canberra. Other than the main road to Goulburn, minor roads link Crookwell with Bathurst, Boorowa, Grabben Gullen, Laggan, and Taralga.

Crookwell railway station was the terminus of the Crookwell railway line.

Crookwell has a small unpaved airstrip approximately 5 km south of the town.

== Climate ==
Due to its exposed location on the upwind side of the Great Dividing Range and somewhat southern latitude, snow is not uncommon during the winter months, with occasional heavy falls. Summers are warm and dry, with cool to cold nights. Winters are cold and wet; when the westerly wind is persistent the daily maximum temperature can struggle to exceed 3 °C (37 °F).

Climate data for Crookwell Post Office (1916–1975, rainfall 1883–2022); 887 m AMSL; 34.46° S, 149.47° E
Month	Jan	Feb	Mar	Apr	May	Jun	Jul	Aug	Sep	Oct	Nov	Dec	Year
Record high °C (°F)	38.0 (100.4)	37.9 (100.2)	32.8 (91.0)	28.3 (82.9)	27.2 (81.0)	17.8 (64.0)	18.5 (65.3)	20.6 (69.1)	26.7 (80.1)	29.4 (84.9)	36.6 (97.9)	35.6 (96.1)	38.0 (100.4)
Mean daily maximum °C (°F)	26.5 (79.7)	25.9 (78.6)	23.6 (74.5)	18.4 (65.1)	13.9 (57.0)	10.3 (50.5)	9.5 (49.1)	11.0 (51.8)	14.7 (58.5)	18.3 (64.9)	21.4 (70.5)	25.0 (77.0)	18.2 (64.8)
Mean daily minimum °C (°F)	10.7 (51.3)	10.7 (51.3)	8.8 (47.8)	5.0 (41.0)	2.3 (36.1)	0.6 (33.1)	−0.4 (31.3)	0.3 (32.5)	2.1 (35.8)	4.6 (40.3)	6.7 (44.1)	9.0 (48.2)	5.0 (41.1)
Record low °C (°F)	2.5 (36.5)	3.9 (39.0)	−0.6 (30.9)	−2.9 (26.8)	−7.2 (19.0)	−8.3 (17.1)	−9.2 (15.4)	−7.2 (19.0)	−5.0 (23.0)	−3.3 (26.1)	−0.6 (30.9)	0.6 (33.1)	−9.2 (15.4)
Average precipitation mm (inches)	69.7 (2.74)	54.7 (2.15)	59.3 (2.33)	57.5 (2.26)	65.9 (2.59)	88.5 (3.48)	84.3 (3.32)	89.9 (3.54)	74.9 (2.95)	76.7 (3.02)	68.0 (2.68)	67.4 (2.65)	863.8 (34.01)
Average precipitation days (≥ 0.2 mm)	7.0	6.3	6.9	7.0	9.2	11.9	12.1	11.7	10.2	9.3	8.0	7.0	106.6
Source: Australian Bureau of Meteorology; Crookwell Post Office

== Media ==
=== Radio stations ===
Radio stations with transmitters located in Crookwell include:

- Radio Crookwell 88.0 FM
- Triple J 91.7 FM (2JJJ)
- 93.5 Eagle FM 103.9 FM (commercial) (2SNO)
- GNFM 106.1 FM (commercial) (2GBN)
- ABC Local Radio 106.9 FM (2ABCRR)
- ABC Radio National 107.7 FM (2ABCRN)

Depending on location some Goulburn, Illawarra, and/or Canberra based radio stations can also be heard. Eagle FM and GNFM (formerly 2GN) are Goulburn based but licensed to serve towns in the Southern Tablelands including Crookwell. In order to reach Crookwell, both have transmitters which relay the Goulburn broadcast but on different frequencies to Goulburn.

=== Television ===
Crookwell has a low powered transmitter broadcasting ABC Television.

Residents wishing to receive a wider range of channels and in digital can attempt to receive signals from either Canberra (Black Mountain), or Orange (Mount Canobolas), although Crookwell is located in the fringe area of both transmitters.

Another option is to use the VAST free-to-view satellite service, which offers a similar range of channels.

=== Newspaper ===
The local newspaper, the Crookwell Gazette was published in print from 1885 until 2020. It now exists in website form only, and shares resources with the Goulburn Post.

== Sport ==
The most popular sport in Crookwell is rugby league. Crookwell has a team competing in the Canberra Rugby League's second division competition, the George Tooke Shield. The club competed on and off in the Group 8 and ACT first grade competitions from 1932 until 1993.

The town also has a rugby union team, the Crookwell Dogs. The club was founded in 1975 and competes in the ACT and Southern NSW Rugby Union's second division competition.

== Notable people ==
Notable people include Kellie White and Emily Smith (Hockeyroos Captain), who both played for the Hockeyroos in international competition.

== Photo gallery ==
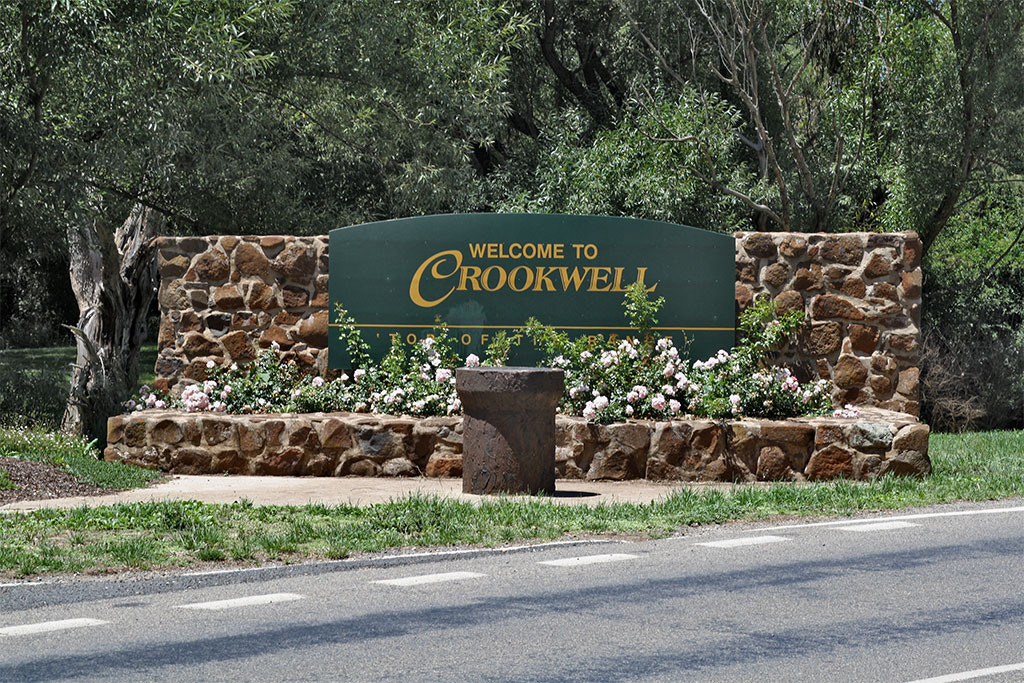
Town entry sign

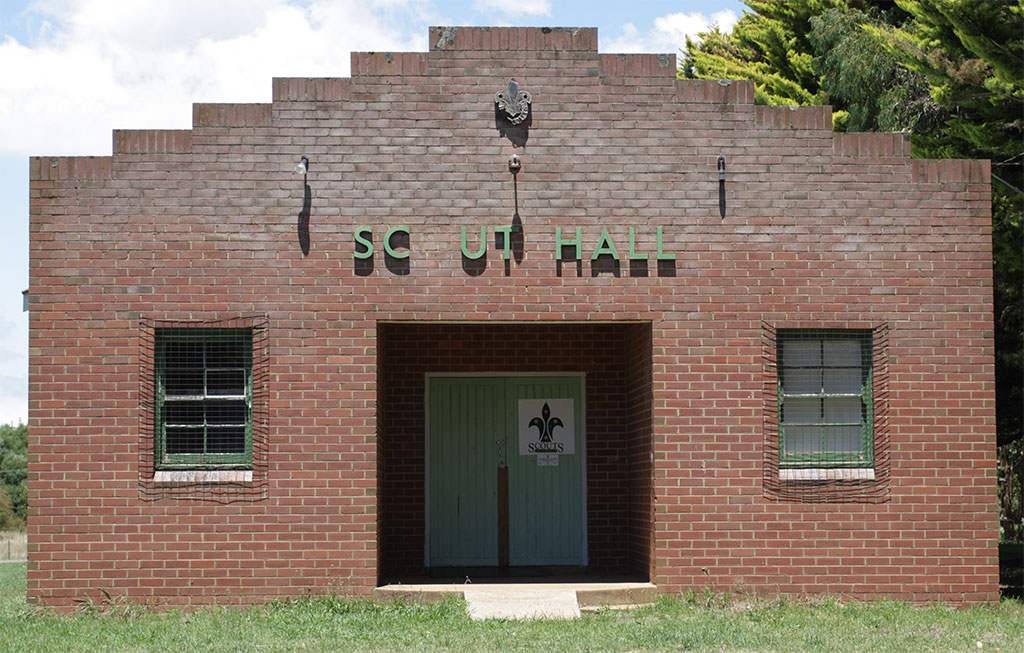
Scout Hall

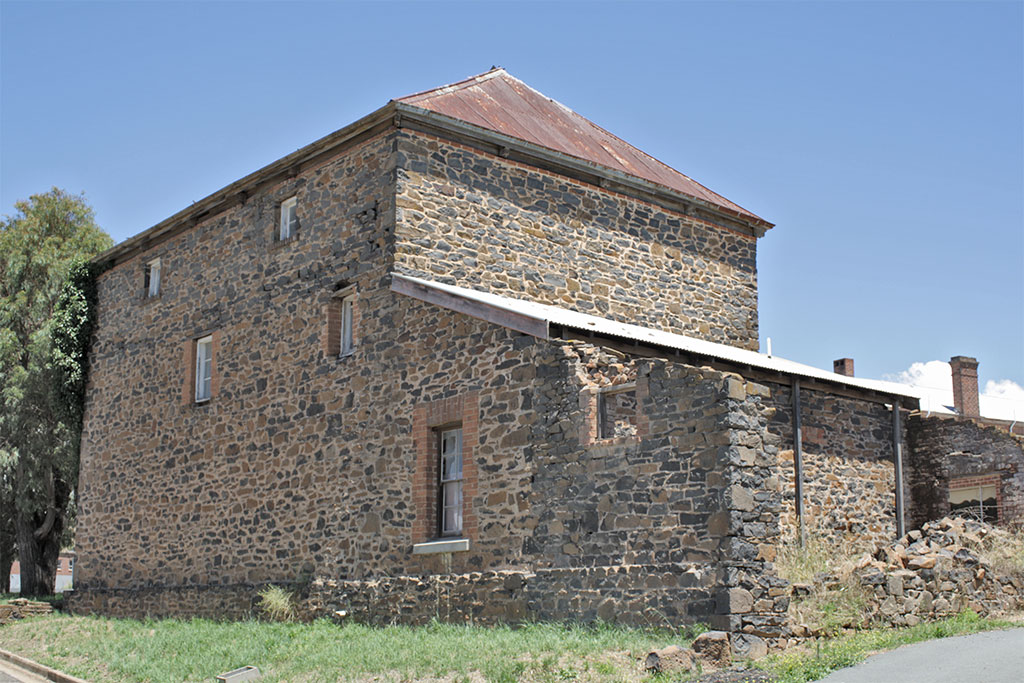
Bluestone building

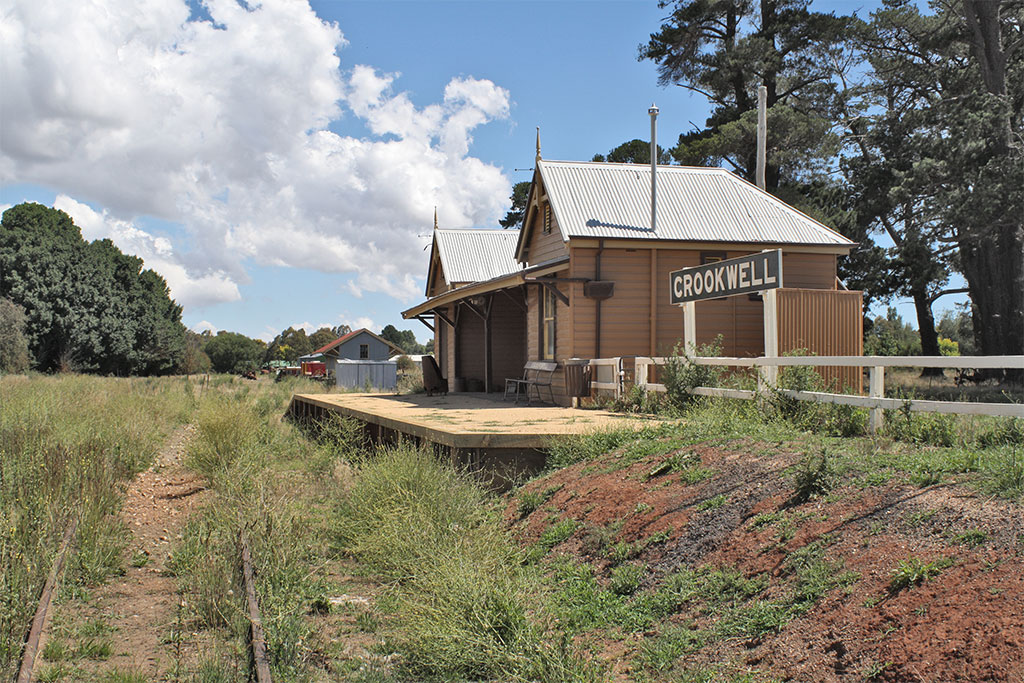
Disused railway station

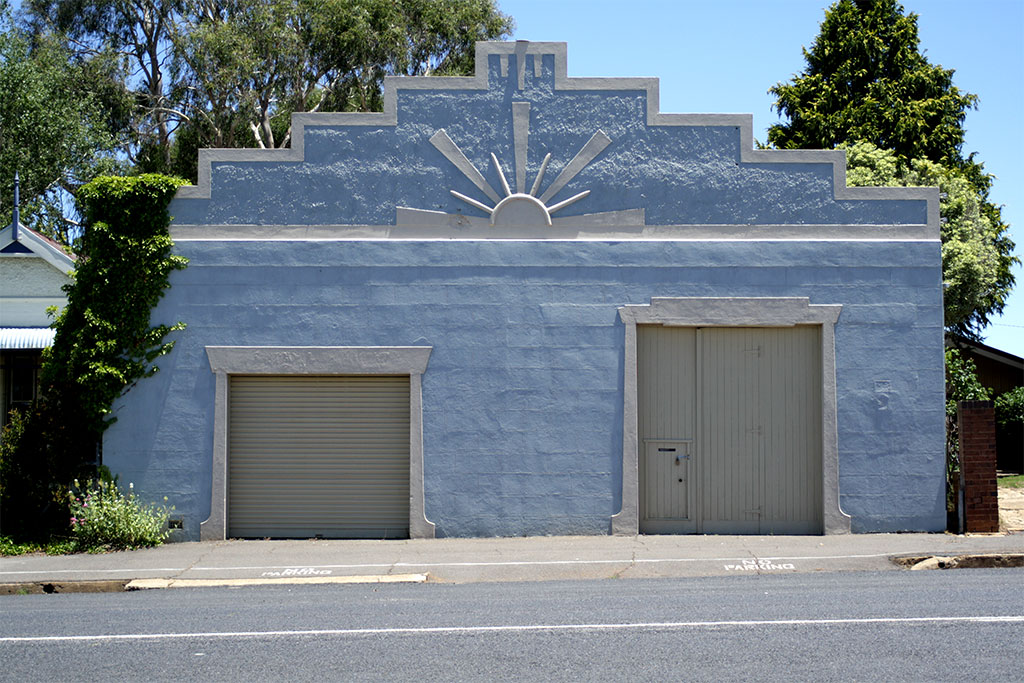
Sunburst façade

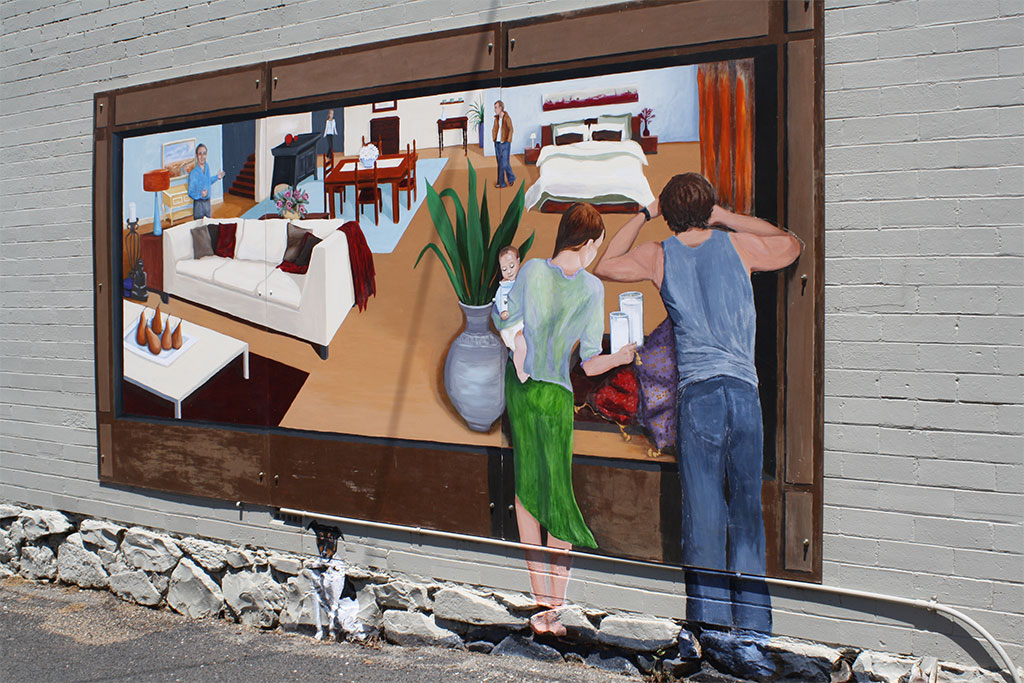
Trompe l'oeil on shop wall

== See also ==
- Crookwell railway line
