= Bungonia, New South Wales =

Bungonia
- Suburb
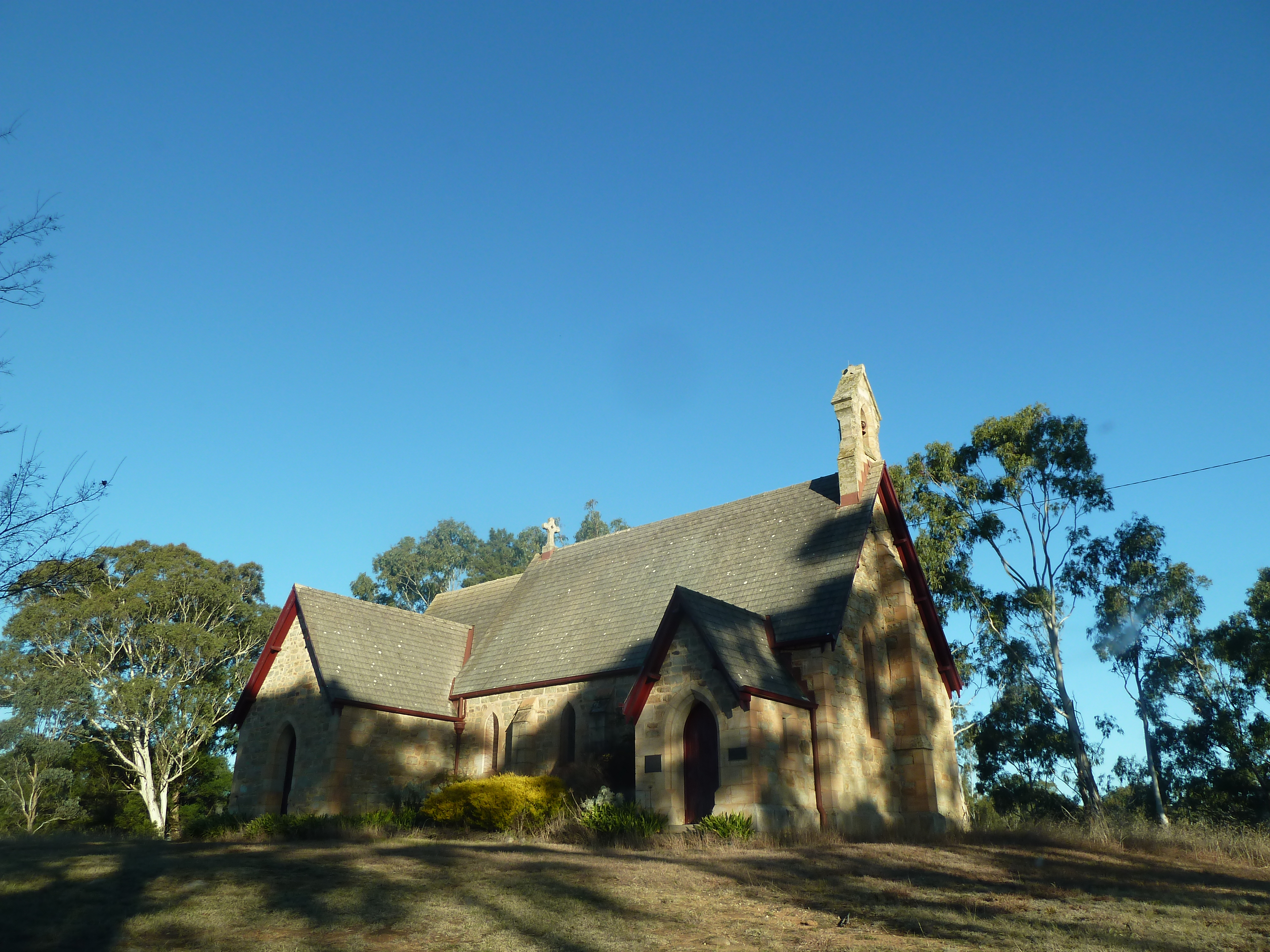
- Christ Church Anglican Church in Bungonia

- Coordinates: 34°51′24″S 149°56′36″E
- Country: Australia
- State: New South Wales
- Region: Southern Tablelands
- LGA: Goulburn Mulwaree Council
- Location: 28 km (17 mi) SE of Goulburn; 59 km (37 mi) SW of Moss Vale; 185 km (115 mi) SW of Sydney

Government
  - State electorate: Goulburn
  - Federal division: Eden-Monaro
- Elevation: 581 m (1,906 ft)

Population
  - Total: 367 (2016 census)
- Postcode: 2580
- County: Argyle
- Parish: Bungonia
Suburbs around Bungonia
Boxers Creek	Marulan	Tallong
Gundary	Bungonia	Tolwong
Quialigo	Windellama

Bungonia is a small town in the Southern Tablelands in New South Wales, Australia in Goulburn Mulwaree. At the 2016 census, Bungonia had a population of 367. The name of the town derives from an Aboriginal word meaning 'sandy creek'.

== History ==
The Bungonia area is the country of the indigenous Gandangara people and its name is derived from their word for "sandy creek".

After European colonisation, Bungonia was called Inverary, which was the name of the post office established in 1832. The settlement was renamed in 1836.

When the Great South Road (now the Hume Highway) bypassed the town, Bungonia ceased to grow beyond a very small village.

== Heritage listings ==
Bungonia has a number of heritage-listed sites, including:

- Christ Church Anglican Church
- Caarne Historic Site
- Inverary Park
- Long Gully Mining Area
- Lumley Park Homestead
- Spring Creek Bungonia Historic Area

== Local school ==
The local area school is the Windellama Public School.

== Notable people ==
- Anne Wiggan – Rewarded with the Order of Australia Medal for contribution to Bungonia and Goulburn Communities

== See also ==
- Bungonia Caves
- Bungonia State Recreation Area
