= Christ Church Anglican Church, Bungonia =

Christ Church Anglican Church
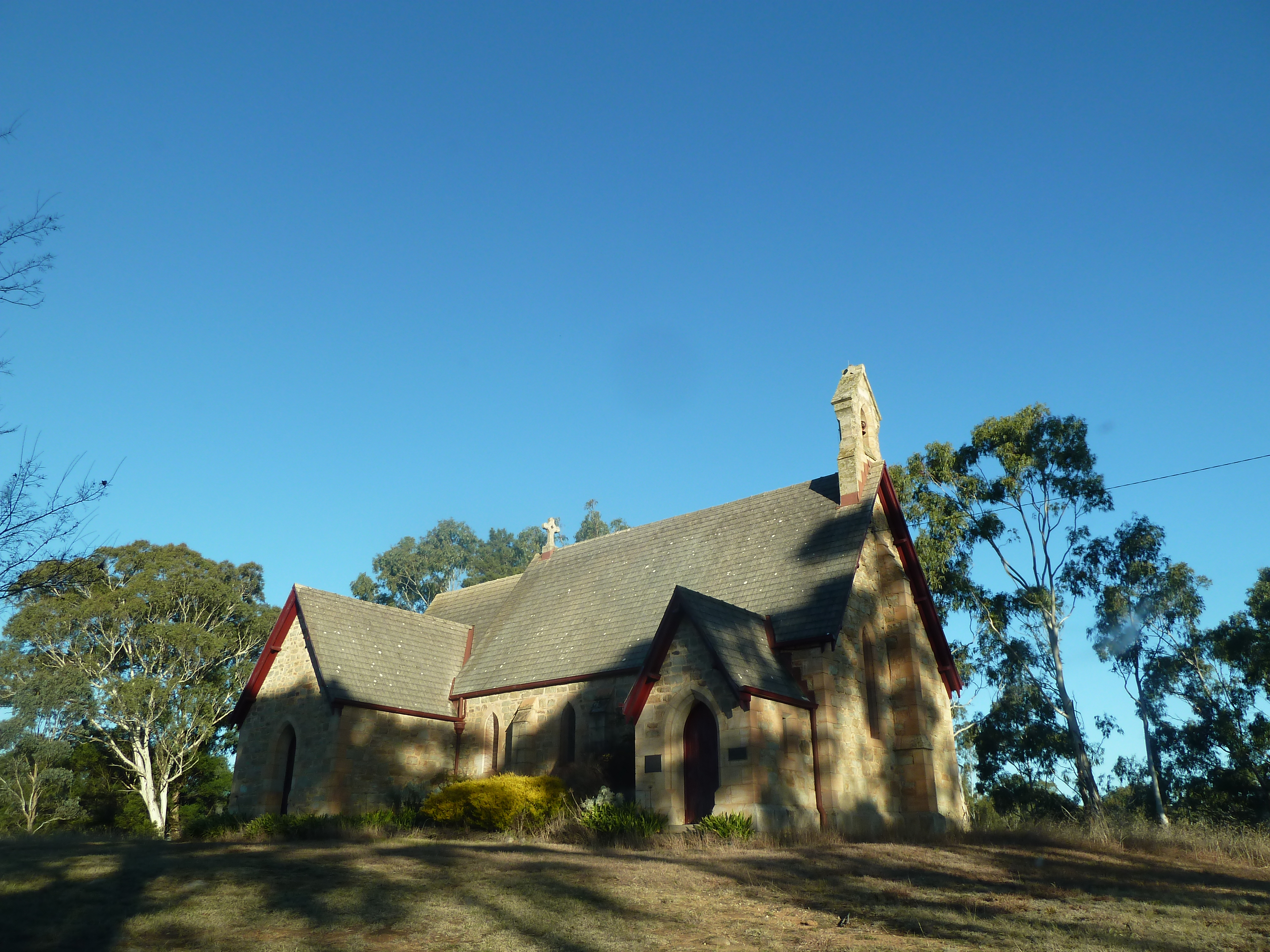
- Christ Church Anglican Church, pictured in 2011
- Christ Church Anglican Church
- 34°51′33″S 149°56′37″E
- Location: King Street, Bungonia, Goulburn Mulwaree Council, New South Wales
- Country: Australia
- Denomination: Anglican
- Website: www.stnicholasgoulburn.org/news-events/2019/12/8/christ-church-bungonia-carols-communion

History
- Status: Church
- Founded: 1845
- Founder: Bishop William Broughton

Architecture
- Functional status: Inactive
- Architect: William Kemp
- Architectural type: Victorian Rustic Gothic
- Years built: 1877–
- Closed: 2018 (for regular services)

Specifications
- Materials: Sandstone

Administration
- Province: New South Wales
- Diocese: Canberra and Goulburn
- Parish: St Nicholas, North Goulburn

New South Wales Heritage Register
- Official name: Christ Church Anglican
- Type: State heritage (built)
- Designated: 1 October 1999
- Reference no.: 1303
- Type: Church
- Category: Religion

Christ Church Anglican Church is a heritage-listed Anglican church at King Street, Bungonia, Goulburn Mulwaree Council, New South Wales, Australia. The current church was designed by William Kemp and built from 1877. The church is administered by St Nicholas Anglican Church, North Goulburn. It was added to the New South Wales State Heritage Register on 1 October 1999.

== History ==
=== Bungonia ===
One of the largest land owners, Robert Futter of Lumely Park, donated 320 acres in 1832 for the township. He was one of several major pastoralists, including Dr David Reid of Inverary Park and James Styles of Reevesdale. Bungonia predated Goulburn and Marulan and was originally slated as a major settlement on the Great South Road. Goulburn eventually assumed that primacy but it was not before significant stone buildings sprung up at Bungonia.

Gazetting of the Bungonia Township in 1833 included dedication of sites for a church, parsonage and glebe, and a base course for stonework was laid in 1836 on the designated site. The contractor however withdrew and fresh tenders were called in the same year: The advertisement notes that plans and specifications were with the prominent Colonial architect John Verge. Early Bungonia planners made provision for a court house, jails, police station, schools and even an orphanage.

There is no evidence that building activity continued beyond the partial erection of the church walls although a foundation stone was subsequently laid between 1839 and 1840. Work on the parsonage however proceeded, allowing the formal appointment of the first resident minister to the Parish of Bungonia, in effect the Southern Highlands, in 1841.

By 1841 Bungonia had 16 households, a police station and lock-up, at least one store, two inns and a population of 82.

In 1841, the first Bishop of Australia, Bishop William Broughton indicated that a church built of slab timber with lath and plaster internal walls and a high pitched roof had been built at Bungonia. The shingles were split from trees on Bungonia Creek. By 1845 this wooden slab church was called a poor temporary structure and a foundation stone for a more permanent church may have been laid.

To what extent this Christ Church continued to be used for regular services is unclear. The unfinished walls of the previous Christ Church were still standing but no records exist to confirm brick additions had been added to the wooden church. Comments made in 1878 suggest that the wooden church was unsafe and virtually unusable whenever it rained or during winter.

Bungonia was the first outreach for the religious movement. Ministers such as the famous "galloping parson", Rev. Thomas Hassall, serviced it amongst a vast area.

=== Christ Church Anglican Church ===
In 1861 the Parish of Bungonia was incorporated into the newly created Diocese of Goulburn, and in 1865, a meeting was held at Bungonia to appeal for the erection of a new church on the old foundations. However, for reasons that may include economic depression in the Goulburn district in the 1860s a foundation stone was not laid until 1877. It is uncertain when the "temporary" slab church was demolished (1878?). Some of the timber survive in the woolshed on one of the Early Colonial Estates in Bungonia, Inverary Park.

The third (present day) building was designed by architect William Kemp, the first articled pupil of Colonial Architect Edmund Blacket and then first Architect appointed to the Department of Public Instruction, (now the NSW Department of Education) responsible for designing many of the earliest schools in Sydney, including the Ultimo Technological Museum (predecessor of the Powerhouse Museum): Christ Church is the only known church to be designed/supervised by Kemp.

When it was formally opened on Friday 24 May 1878, the church was unfinished - the windows were covered in with calico, the interior walls unplastered and the church lacked doors. Interior fittings were temporary. For this reason Christ Church was not formally consecrated until 1893. An account, transcribing speeches that were made at the ceremony, was published in the Goulburn Herald on 27 October 1893. Other reasons for the delayed consecration include severe drought and economic depression in the 1890s (arguably the most severe in historic times).

In 1888 Bungonia was absorbed into the parish of Marulan - beginning a shifting pattern of affiliations that continues up to the present day. Between 1905 and 1906, an attempt was made to revive Bungonia as a separate parish but the appointment only lasted a few months. The rector serving Christ Church from Marulan over the same period is the last known "parson" to have occupied the parsonage which was then leased and then in 1958 sold.

Loss of most of the diocesan records has meant that the new "church" effectively passed into de facto "oblivion" for much of the twentieth century. The few surviving documents suggest that isolation and lack of funds to support a local clergyman in remote parishes such as Bungonia continued to preoccupy the Diocese. For example, Ministers serving Christ Church were given a travel allowance equal to 35% of their stipend. In spite of the long distances over unmade roads, the churches were expected to provide much of the "grass roots" social support in the rural communities.

Memorial plaques in Christ Church point to the substantial replacement of the internal fabric since the 1940s. Most of these item relate to or were owned by earlier incumbents and parishioners. For example, Altar Window and a second window at the rear of the Nave were replaced by stained glass about 1960. It is not known whether any special ceremony was held to mark the centenary of the opening of Christ Church in 1978.

Closure of the Anglican church at Marulan in 1981 - due to the disproportionate cost of maintaining the building relative to the (decreasing) size of congregations - resulted in the transfer of jurisdiction over Christ Church to the Parish of North Goulburn. Predictably, the move provoked a fear amongst Bungonia residents that Christ Church (with an equally small congregation) would also be closed.

Interest in Christ Church and the Bungonia village as historic places surged in the 1980s when the number of persons residing in or visiting the district rose substantially. Reasons include the upgrading and sealing of roads to Marulan and Goulburn (diminishing the sense of isolation), subdivision of many of the large Colonial estates and the upgrading of camping facilities at the Bungonia State Recreation Reserve (allied with increasing interest in the Bungonia Caves which are among the deepest in the southern hemisphere). The heightened local interest in Christ Church as a heritage site is exemplified by the compilation of a local history of "Christ Church Bungonia" in 1988 (manuscript) and its formal but private publication to "celebrate the centenary of the church on October 24th 1993". Another local resident has privately published a history of the Bungonia cemetery. The expanding local population has provided a new congregation base for Christ Church. Weekly services were re-instituted in 1996 were are centered around community services conducted by local residents and/or lay preachers from North Goulburn.

Receipts from weekly services were used to maintain the fabric of the church and fund its charitable role in the Bungonia district.

In 2018, regular services are no longer held at Bungonia. St Nicholas' Church in North Goulburn continues to be responsible for the church.

== Description ==
The walls are made of a local rubblestone with smoothly dressed sandstone used for buttresses, quoins and surrounding the single,double and triple-light lancet windows and arched doorways. The lichen-covered, shingled rood includes a bell tower and celtic cross (both made of sandstone). Entrance is via the high-gabled stone porch or similar but larger stone vestry on the northern side.

The interior of the church is divided into the traditional sectors of nave, Chancel-Sanctuary by a corbelled chancel arch made of dressed sandstone. The walls are coated with a thin plaster (white ash) and modern white paint. Al interior doors, windows and archways are lined by unpainted sandstone quoins. Most windows are infilled with stained glass. The ceiling is of simplified hammer-beam construction with diagonally set ceiling boards. Inset into the Sanctuary side walls are distinctive Gothic niches (piscinas) outlined in tracery. The stained glass triple-lancet Alter Window lacks tracery.

The original plain glass windows were replaced during the twentieth century by stained glass commemorating past rectors and local families. The original hardwood shingle roof was replaced by fibro shingles about 1935.

The external fabric was reported to be in good condition as at 7 June 1999. Exceptions are the boundary fence (intact but decayed), the Nave floor (badly affected by dry rot) and one interior wall (signs of rising damp - said to have been fixed).

Christ Church's form and (fixed) internal fabric have remained intact since its building in 1878-1893 except for the roof cladding and some windows. In both cases these early twentieth century fittings match the "Early English" style of the original church. The cultural landscape in which it stands retains the essential elements and much of the character of the nineteenth century village in Australia.

The foundations of the 1836 church (visible at the western end of the 1870s building) offer an excellent opportunity for historical archaeological research. It is unclear whether the foundations of the 1840s wooden church are preserved.

== Heritage listing ==
Christ Church Anglican was listed on the New South Wales State Heritage Register on 1 October 1999. The heritage statement read:

Christ Church, Bungonia is an appealing and largely intact example of Early English (Gothic) church architecture as adapted to rural Australia in the mid-late Victorian Period. With its parsonage, Glebe, and cemetery, it provides one of the few largely intact groups of linked heritage places that can be associated with the southward expansion of the Church of England beyond Sydney after 1820. The cultural landscape of which the church and its grounds are an integral part, retains the appearance of a nineteenth century rural village. The present church was opened in 1878 and consecrated in 1893. It is the latest of three Colonial period churches to occupy the site and partially overlies the archaeological remains of what is arguably the first (1836) stone church to be built on the Southern highlands. The church has strong links with virtually all early Colonial Period properties in the Southern Highlands and many important Colonial Period personages. It mirrors many of the political and social forces which have shaped European settlement in southern New South Wales, in particular the seminal role played by the challenging location of major road and rail links between Sydney and Melbourne.

== See also ==
- List of Anglican churches in New South Wales
