= Brisbane Grove =

- Town
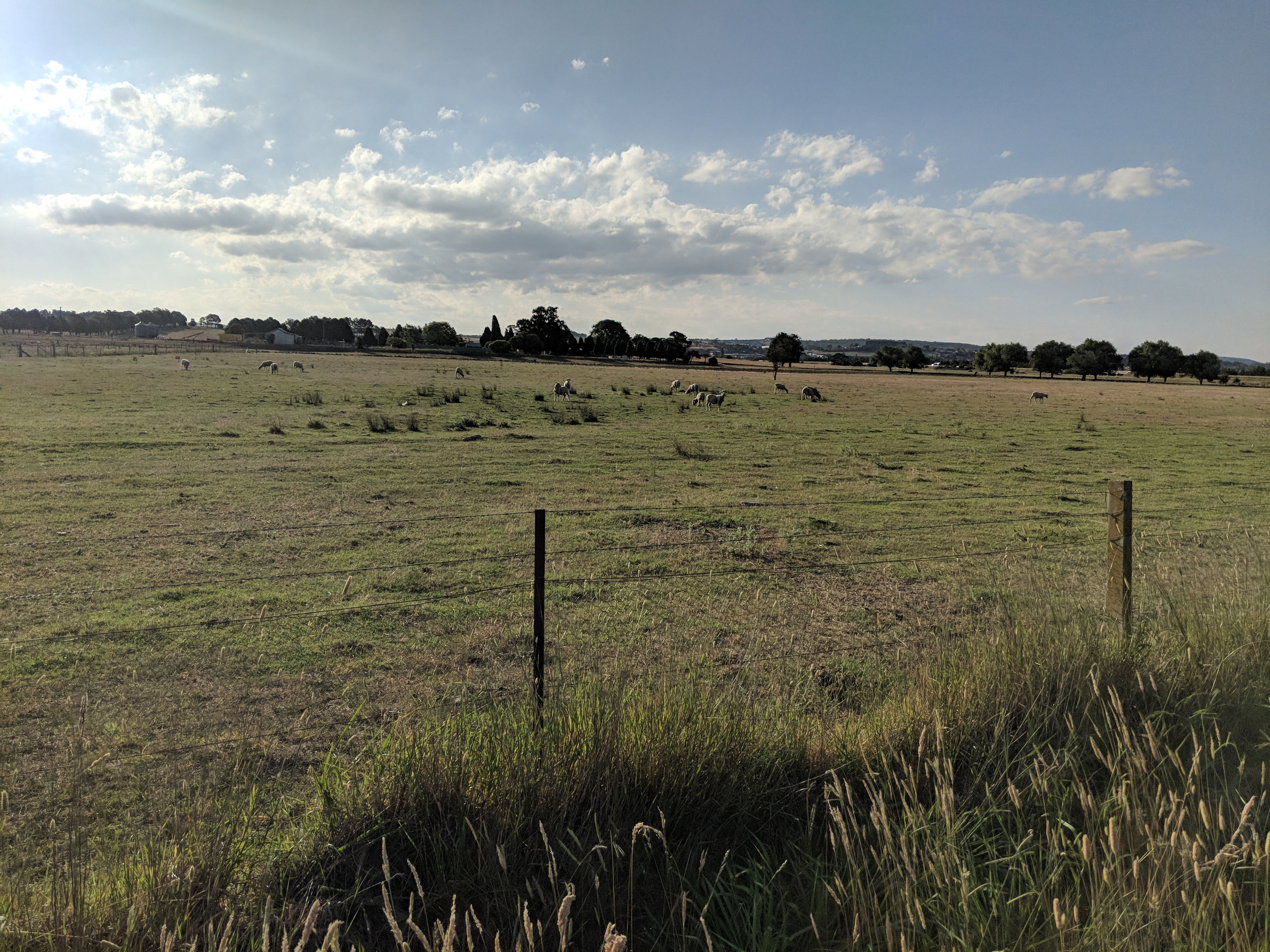

- Coordinates: 34°47′57″S 149°42′02″E
- Country: Australia
- State: New South Wales
- Region: Southern Tablelands
- LGA: Goulburn Mulwaree Council
- Location: 8 km (5.0 mi) S of Goulburn; 82 km (51 mi) N of Braidwood; 85 km (53 mi) E of Yass; 200 km (120 mi) SW of Sydney

Government
  - State electorate: Goulburn
  - Federal division: Eden-Monaro
- Elevation: 636 m (2,087 ft)

Population
  - Total: 147 (SAL 2021)
- Postcode: 2580
- County: Argyle
- Parish: Goulburn
Localities around Brisbane Grove
Goulburn	Goulburn	Boxers Creek
Goulburn	Brisbane Grove	Gundary
Tirrannaville	Tirrannaville	Gundary

Brisbane Grove is a locality in the Goulburn Mulwaree Council area, New South Wales, Australia. It is located on the road from Goulburn to Braidwood about 8 km south of Goulburn. Goulburn Airport is in the locality, on its southwestern edge. The Hume Highway passes through the northernmost part of Brisbane Grove, but there is no exit or entrance. At the 2016 census, it had a population of 131.
