= Lower Boro =

- Town
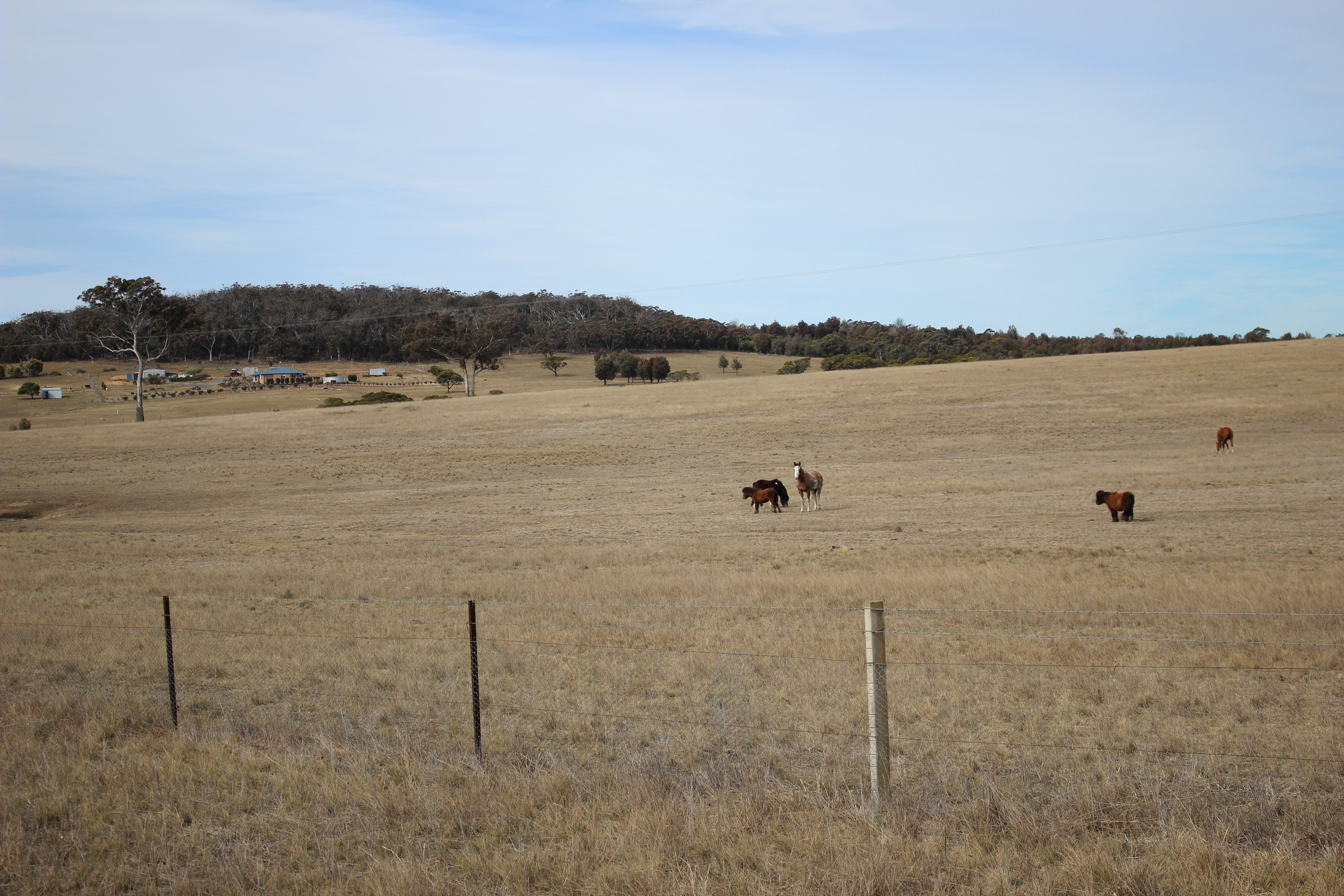
- Lower Boro

- Coordinates: 35°11′28″S 149°47′17″E
- Country: Australia
- State: New South Wales
- Region: Southern Tablelands
- LGA: Goulburn Mulwaree Council
- Location: 54 km (34 mi) S of Goulburn; 86 km (53 mi) NE of Canberra; 16 km (9.9 mi) SE of Tarago; 116 km (72 mi) W of Nowra; 228 km (142 mi) SW of Sydney

Government
  - State electorate: Goulburn
  - Federal division: Eden-Monaro
- Elevation: 634 m (2,080 ft)

Population
  - Total: 217 (SAL 2021)
- Postcode: 2580
- County: Argyle
- Parish: Boro
Localities around Lower Boro
Lake Bathurst	Windellama	Windellama
Tarago	Lower Boro	Oallen
Boro	Mayfield	Mayfield

Lower Boro is a locality in the Goulburn Mulwaree Council area, New South Wales, Australia. It is located about 16 km southeast of Tarago. The link from Tarago to Windellama, which is part of a link from Canberra to Nerriga and Nowra, passes through the northern part of the locality. At the 2016 census, Lower Boro had a population of 176.

== Heritage listings ==
Lower Boro has a number of heritage-listed sites, including:

- Mayfield Road: Mayfield
