= Yarra, New South Wales =

Yarra
- Town
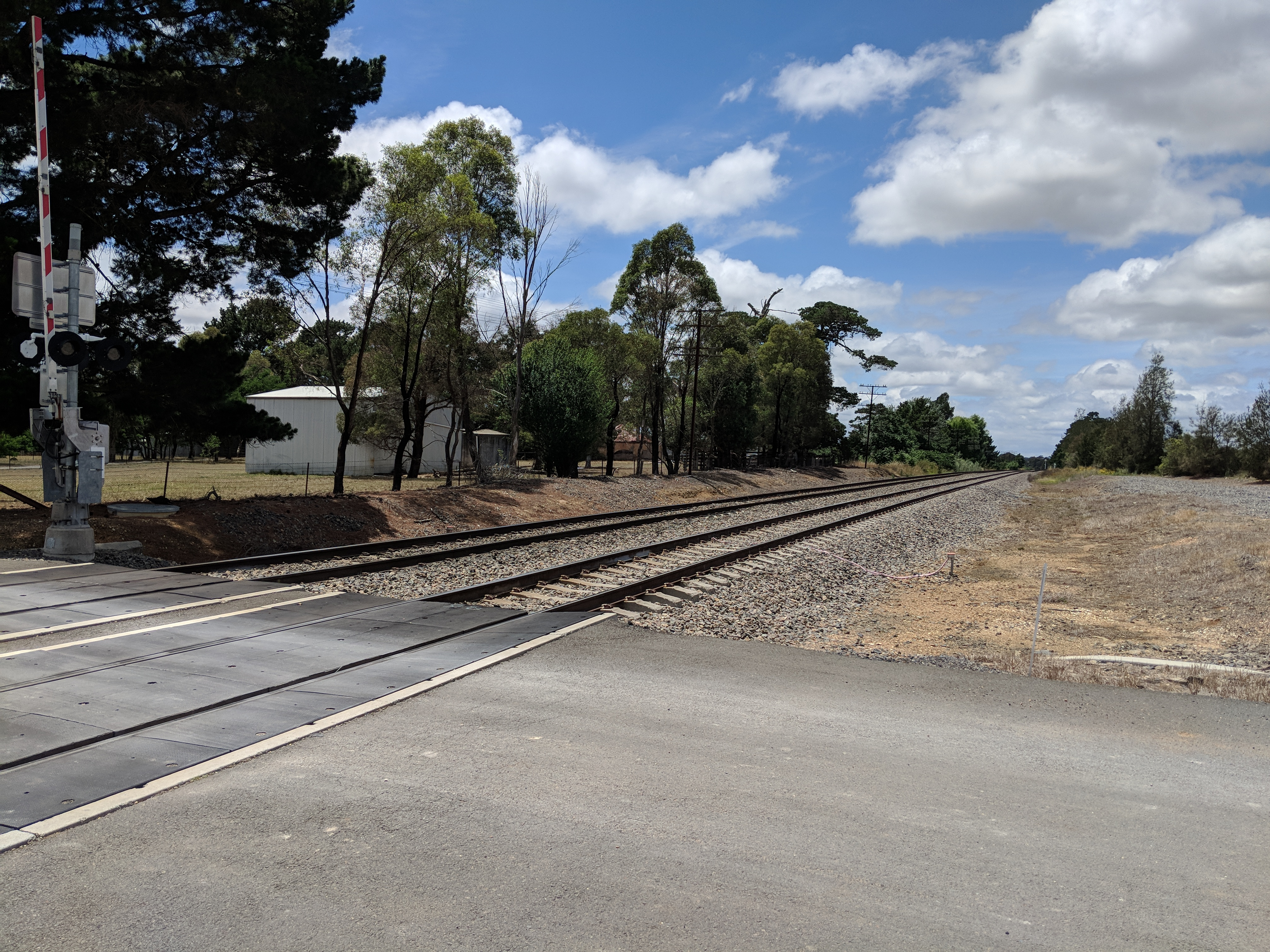
- Level crossing on Main Southern railway line

- Coordinates: 34°48′57″S 149°38′02″E
- Country: Australia
- State: New South Wales
- Region: Southern Tablelands
- LGA: Goulburn Mulwaree Council
- Location: 18 km (11 mi) SW of Goulburn; 84 km (52 mi) NE of Canberra; 213 km (132 mi) SW of Sydney

Government
  - State electorate: Goulburn
  - Federal division: Eden-Monaro
- Elevation: 683 m (2,241 ft)

Population
  - Total: 138 (SAL 2021)
- Postcode: 2580
- County: Argyle
- Parish: Goulburn
Localities around Yarra
Pomeroy	Baw Baw	Run-O-Waters
Parkesbourne	Yarra	Tirrannaville
Wollogorang	Currawang	Tirrannaville

Yarra is a locality in the Goulburn Mulwaree Council, New South Wales, Australia. It is located about 18 km southwest of Goulburn, 84 km northeast of Canberra and 213 km southwest of Sydney. It lies at the intersection of the Federal Highway and the Hume Highway. Yarra railway station was a station on the Main Southern railway line from 1875 to the 1970s. A small settlement grew up around the railway station and the Hume Highway, parts of which were demolished during road widening in the 1970s. It had a public school from 1869 to 1970, operating as a "half-time" school until 1873.

== Demographics ==
At the 2016 census, Yarra had a population of 173. It had dropped to 138 at the 2021 census.
