= Tirrannaville =

- Town
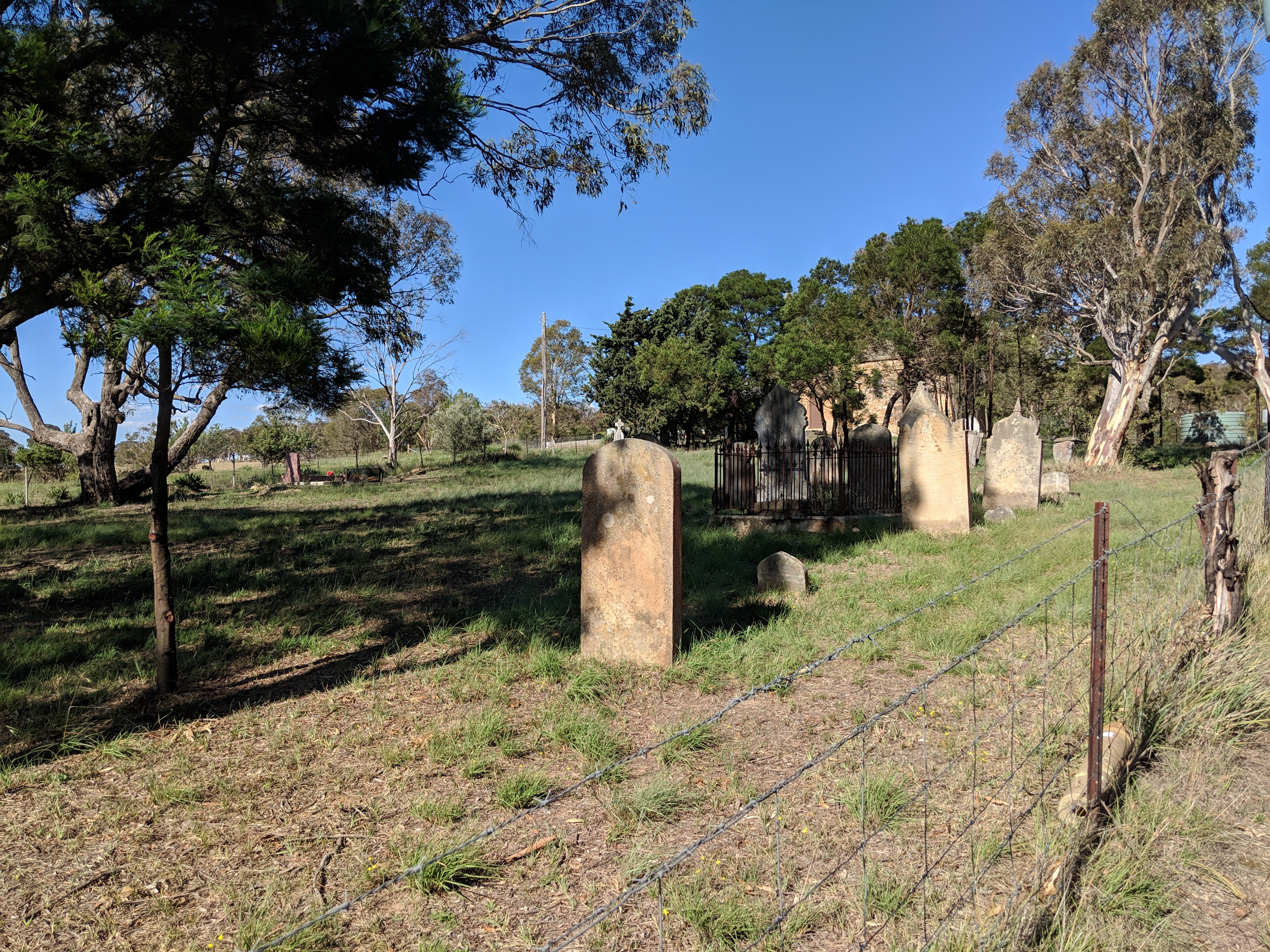
- Tirrannaville, cemetery

- Coordinates: 34°49′57″S 149°41′02″E
- Country: Australia
- State: New South Wales
- Region: Southern Tablelands
- LGA: Goulburn Mulwaree Council
- Location: 11 km (6.8 mi) S of Goulburn; 93 km (58 mi) NE of Canberra; 213 km (132 mi) SW of Sydney; 72 km (45 mi) N of Braidwood

Government
  - State electorate: Goulburn
  - Federal division: Eden-Monaro
- Elevation: 654 m (2,146 ft)

Population
  - Total: 235 (SAL 2021)
- Postcode: 2580
- County: Argyle
- Parish: Terranna; Goulburn
Localities around Tirrannaville
Run-O-Waters	Goulburn	Brisbane Grove
Yarra	Tirrannaville	Gundary
Currawang	Lake Bathurst	Quialigo

Tirrannaville is a locality in the Goulburn Mulwaree Council, New South Wales, Australia. It is located about 11 km south of Goulburn on the road to Braidwood. It was formerly called Terranna, which is the name of the parish covering most of the locality. The northern part of the defined locality, including the small settlement of Tirrannaville and cemetery, is in the parish of Goulburn. At the 2016 census, it had a population of 237. The locality mostly consists of grazing land. It has had a public school since 1869.

== Railway stations ==
=== Komungla station ===
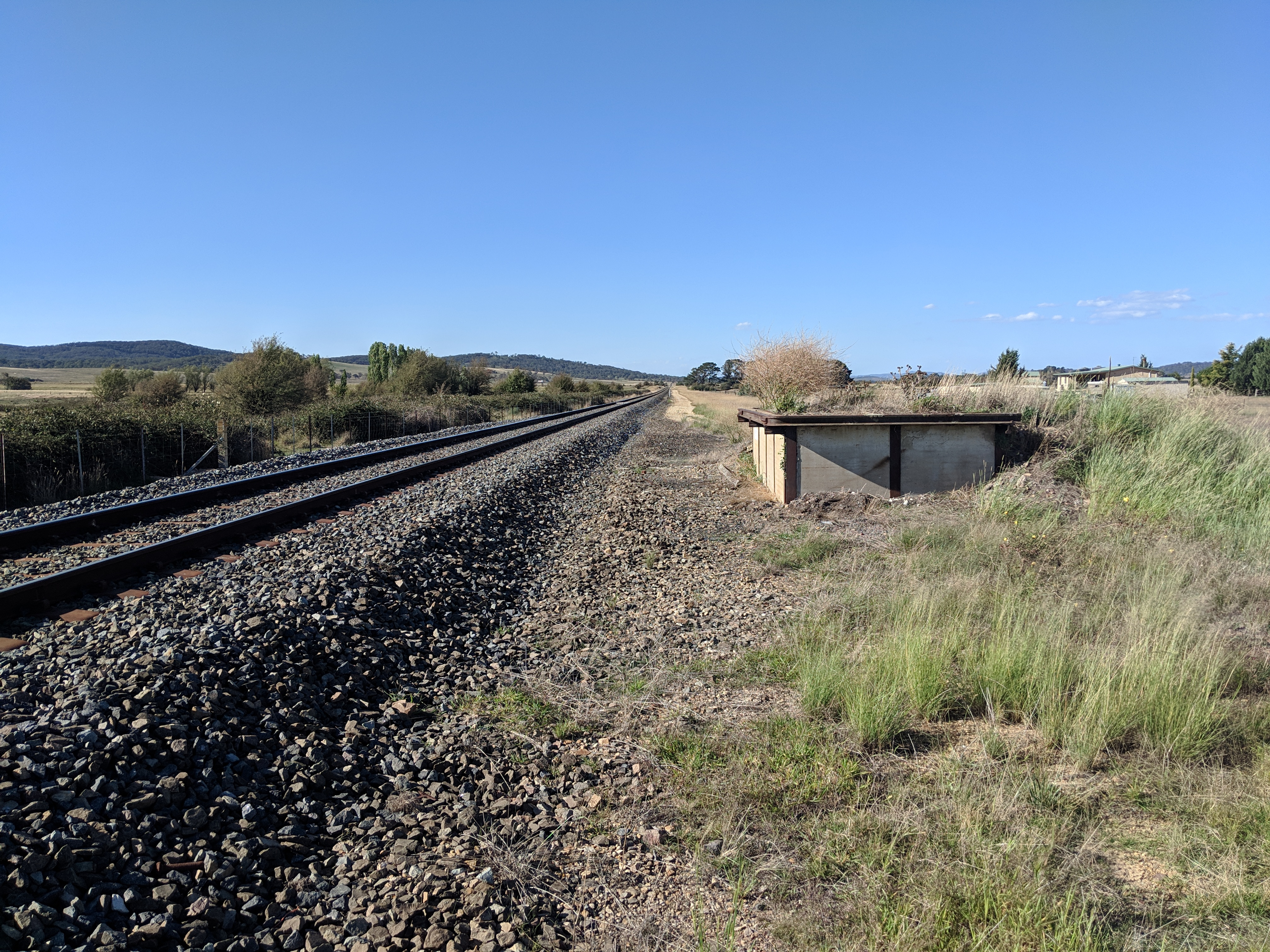
Site of Komungla station

A station (34°52′00″S 149°38′47″E) was established on the Bombala railway line at Komungla in what is now the locality of Tirrannaville in 1884 and it was originally called Bangalore. A small settlement developed there and the station was renamed Komungla in 1916. The station was closed in 1971.

=== Tirranna station ===
Another station or siding (34°49′06″S 149°39′57″E) was established under the name of Tirranna near the current Tirrannaville settlement in 1906 and was closed in 1941.
