= Run-O-Waters =

- Town
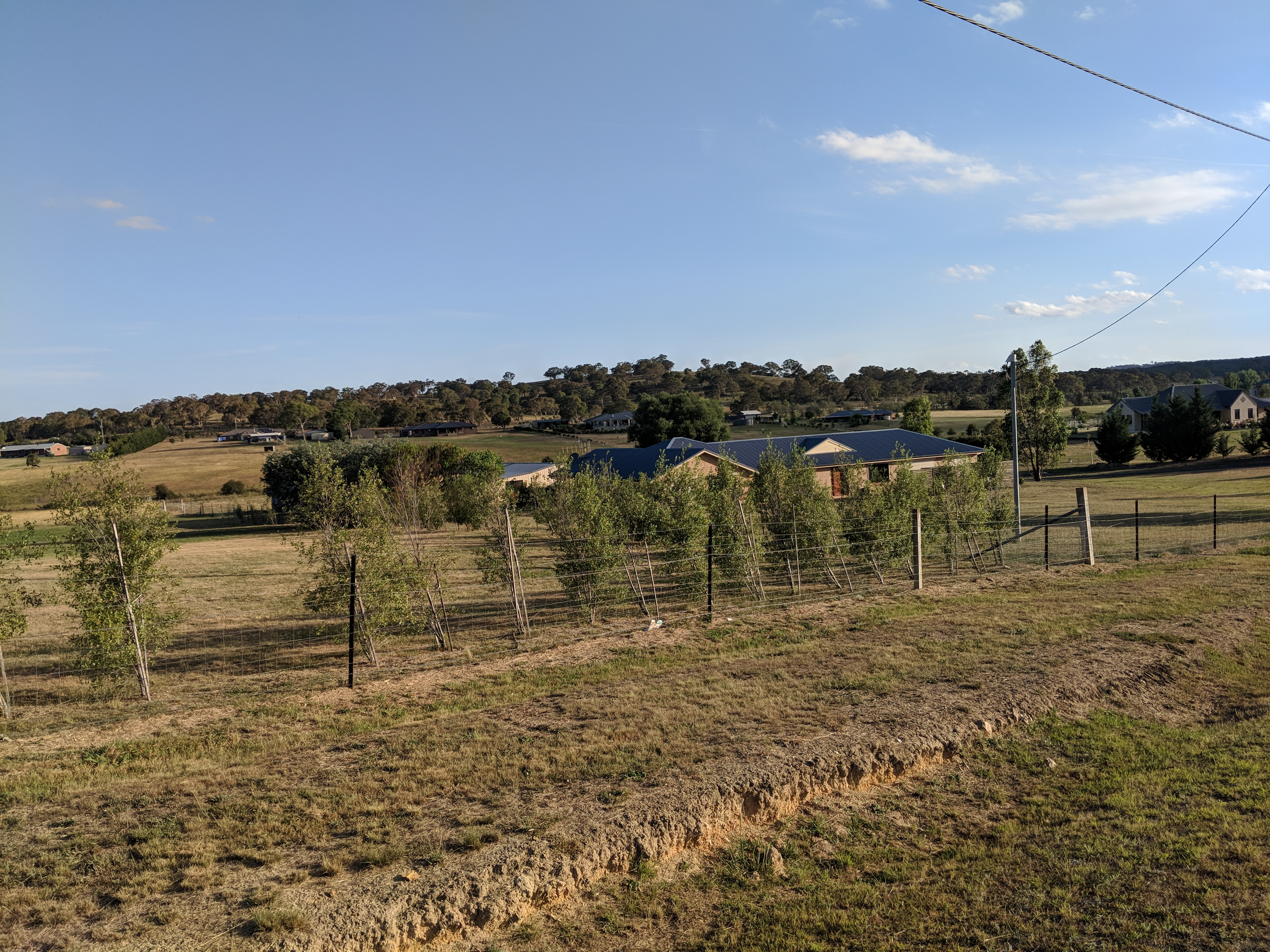
- Roadside at Run-O-Waters

- Coordinates: 34°46′16″S 149°39′52″E
- Country: Australia
- State: New South Wales
- Region: Southern Tablelands
- LGA: Goulburn Mulwaree Council
- Location: 7 km (4.3 mi) W of Goulburn; 84 km (52 mi) E of Yass; 89 km (55 mi) NE of Canberra; 204 km (127 mi) SW of Sydney

Government
  - State electorate: Goulburn
  - Federal division: Eden-Monaro
- Elevation: 675 m (2,215 ft)

Population
  - Total: 605 (SAL 2021)
- Postcode: 2580
- County: Argyle
- Parish: Goulburn
Localities around Run-O-Waters
Baw Baw	Baw Baw	Goulburn
Yarra	Run-O-Waters	Goulburn
Yarra	Tirrannaville	Goulburn

Run-O-Waters is a locality in the Goulburn Mulwaree Council, New South Wales, Australia. It is a rural residential area located on the western outskirts of Goulburn, generally to the north of the Hume Highway and Run-O-Waters creek. At the 2016 census, it had a population of 471.
