= Clyde Cant =

Australian rugby league player

- Full name: Arthur Cyril Clyde Cant
- Born: 23 February 1907 Gundary, NSW, Australia
- Died: 23 March 1957 (aged 50)

Rugby union career
- Position: Centre three-quarter
Provincial / State sides
Years	Team	Apps	(Points)
1927–28	New South Wales	2	(14)
- Rugby league career

Playing information
- Position: Centre / Fullback
Club
Years	Team	Pld	T	G	FG	P
1931–32	Western Suburbs	4	0	2	0	4
1935	Canterbury-Bankstown	3	0	0	0	0
	Total	7	0	2	0	4

Arthur Cyril Clyde Cant (23 February 1907 – 23 March 1957) was an Australian cross-code rugby footballer.

== Biography ==
Hailing from Gundary, outside Goulburn, Cant was educated at Fort Street High School in Sydney, where he played rugby union for Manly while still a schoolboy. His preferred position in rugby union was centre three-quarter.

Cant switched to rugby league during the 1930s, playing for both Western Suburbs Magpies and Canterbury-Bankstown as a centre/fullback, with a stint in between as coach of Albury.

In addition to the rugby codes, Cant also captained Manly in Sydney first-grade cricket.
