= Oallen =

- Town
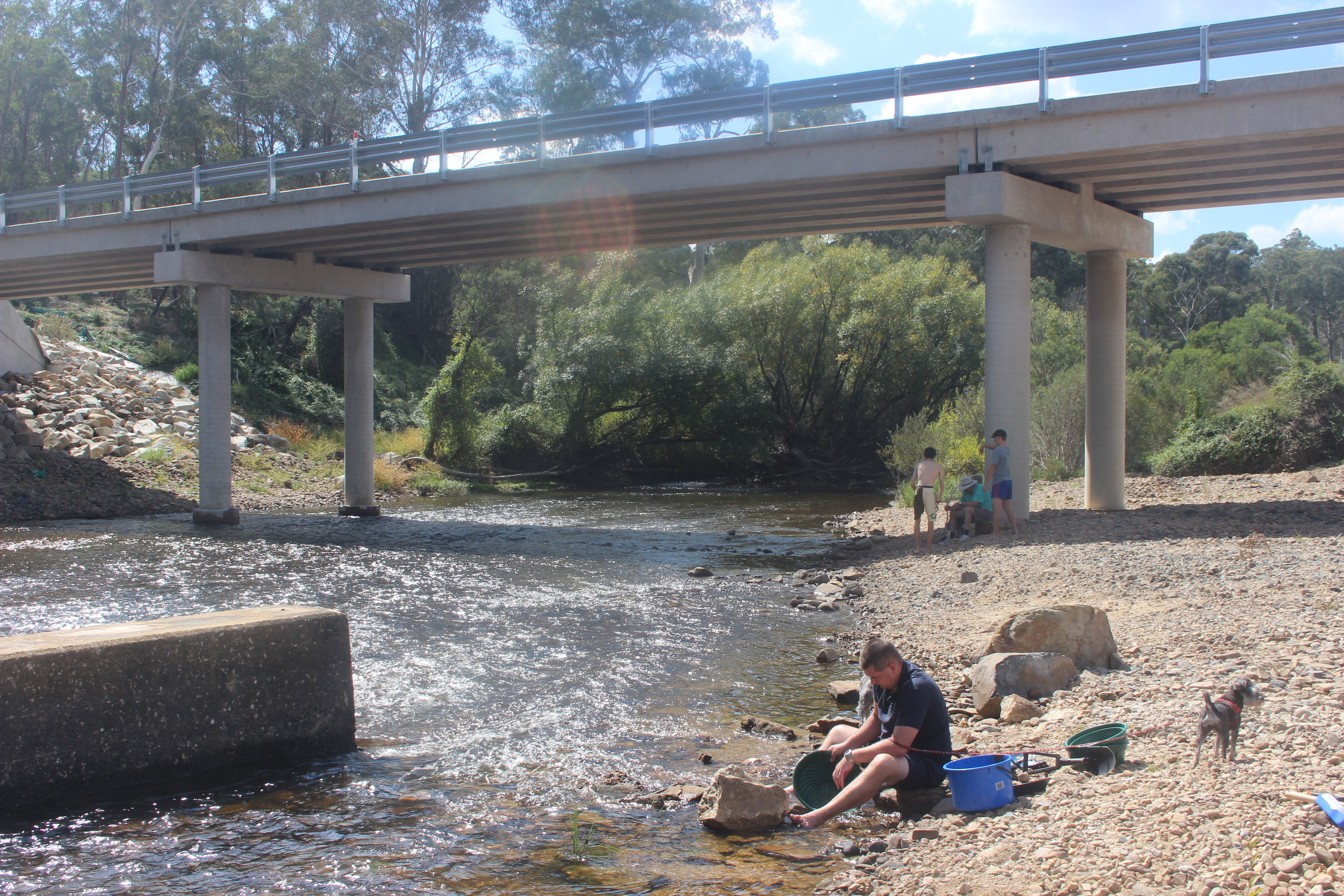
- Panning for gold at Oallen Ford below new bridge over the Shoalhaven River

- Coordinates: 35°08′21″S 149°56′36″E
- Country: Australia
- State: New South Wales
- Region: Southern Tablelands
- LGAs: Goulburn Mulwaree Council; Queanbeyan–Palerang Regional Council
- Location: 60 km (37 mi) SE of Goulburn; 97 km (60 mi) NE of Canberra; 83 km (52 mi) SW of Nowra; 229 km (142 mi) SSW of Sydney

Government
  - State electorate: Goulburn
  - Federal division: Eden-Monaro
- Elevation: 538 m (1,765 ft)

Population
  - Total: 145 (SAL 2021)
- Postcode: 2622
- County: Argyle; St Vincent
- Parish: Jerralong; Jerricknorra; Oallen
Localities around Oallen
Windellama	Windellama	Nerriga
Lower Boro	Oallen	Tomboye
Mayfield	Mayfield	Marlowe

Oallen (/oʊlən/) is a locality in the Goulburn Mulwaree Council area, New South Wales, Australia. It is located on the Shoalhaven River and the Oallen Ford Road about 61 km southeast of Goulburn and 82 km southwest of Nowra. The Oallen Ford Road has recently been upgraded to improve the connection from Canberra and Goulburn to Nerriga, Nowra and Jervis Bay. At the 2016 census, Oallen had a population of 141.

The Shoalhaven River in the Oallen Ford area was a site for gold panning in the 19th century. There has been a recent revival of gold panning.

The town attracted significant attention when, on 9 August 2026, a suitcase containing what was purported to be a dead woman's body was located on Wolgon Road and reported to police by two passers-by. However, after police established a crime scene and carried out their investigation, the item inside the suitcase was revealed to be a life-like doll with clothing, a nose piercing and markings that resembled bruises.
