= Gundary =

- Town
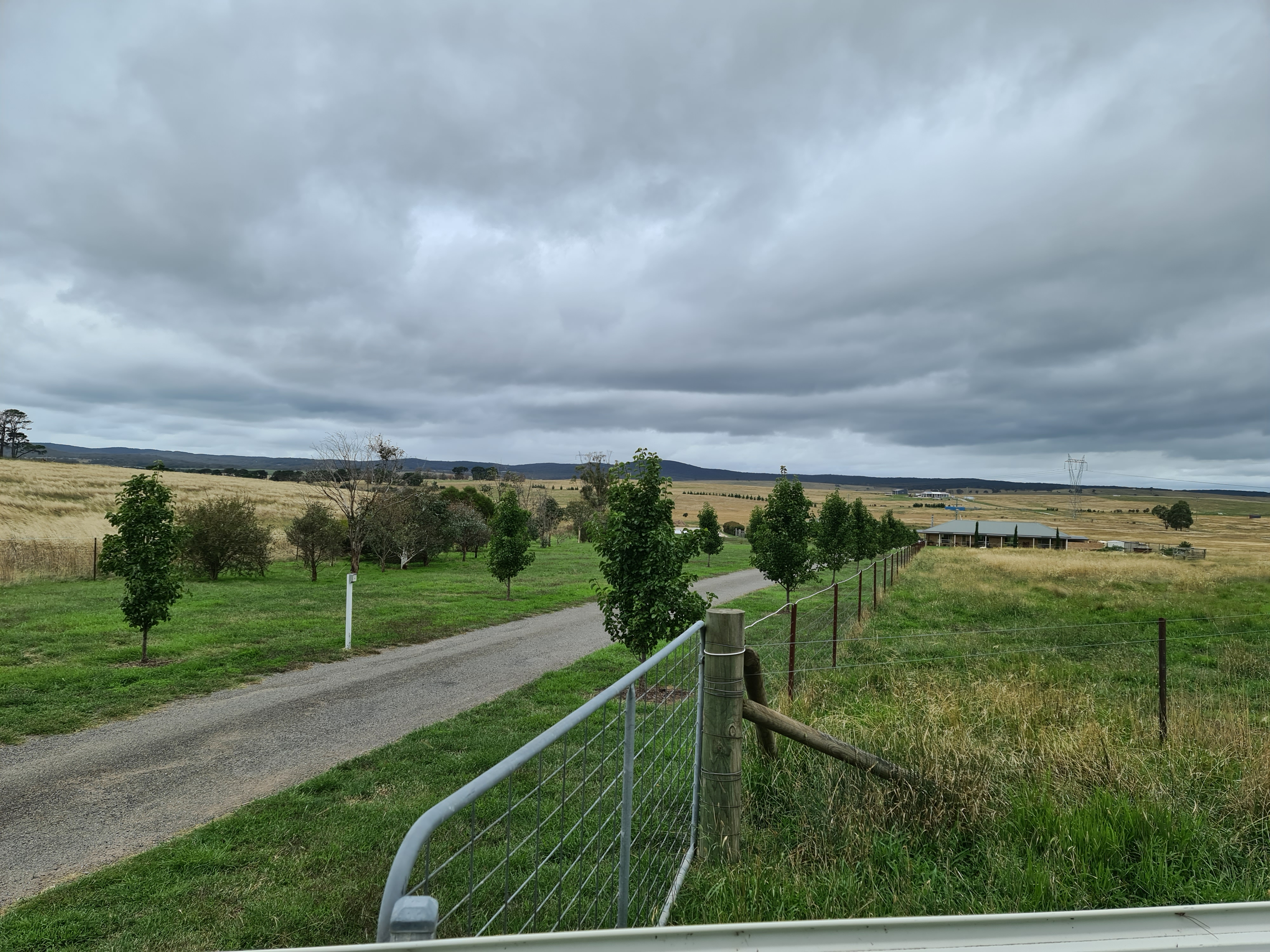

- Coordinates: 34°49′54″S 149°45′04″E
- Country: Australia
- State: New South Wales
- Region: Southern Tablelands
- LGA: Goulburn Mulwaree
- Location: 105 km (65 mi) NE of Canberra; 20 km (12 mi) SE of Goulburn; 199 km (124 mi) SW of Sydney

Government
  - State electorate: Goulburn
  - Federal division: Eden-Monaro
- Elevation: 682 m (2,238 ft)

Population
  - Total: 306 (2021 census)
- Postcode: 2580
- County: Argyle
- Parish: Goulburn
Localities around Gundary
Goulburn	Boxers Creek	Boxers Creek
Brisbane Grove	Gundary	Bungonia
Tirrannaville	Quialigo	Bungonia

Gundary (/ɡʌndərɪ/) is a locality in Goulburn Mulwaree Council in New South Wales, Australia. It is about 20 kilometres (12 mi) southeast of Goulburn on the road to Windellama and 105 kilometres (65 mi) northeast of Canberra. Its land is largely used for grazing, but it includes rural residential. At the 2021 census, it had a population of 306.
