= Thornes Bridge =

- Coordinates: 34.78143°S 149.70616°E
- Carries: Braidwood Road
- Crosses: Mulwaree River
- Locale: Goulburn–Brisbane Grove boundary, New South Wales, Australia

Characteristics
- Design: Allan truss
- Material: Wood
- Total length: 100.8 m (330.7 ft)
- Width: 5.5 m (18.0 ft)
- Longest span: 27.4 m (89.9 ft)
- No. of spans: 9

History
- Designer: Percy Allan
- Opened: 1920
- Closed: 2002

The Thornes Bridge was a timber Allan truss-type bridge that spanned the Mulwaree River between Goulburn and Brisbane Grove in New South Wales, Australia. It was a rare example of a bridge of this type built after World War I. It was built in 1920 by J.J. McPhillips, and was designed by Percy Allan.

== Description ==
Thornes Bridge was a timber Allan truss bridge, 100.8 m (330.7 ft) in length. The main span of the bridge was 27.4 m (89.9 ft) long.

Due to its significance to the region, the original bridge had been listed on the NSW State Heritage Register.

The bridge is no longer in use, having been superseded in 2002. It was progressively dismantled in 2013.
