= Lake Bathurst (New South Wales) =

Lake in New South Wales, Australia

- Bundong
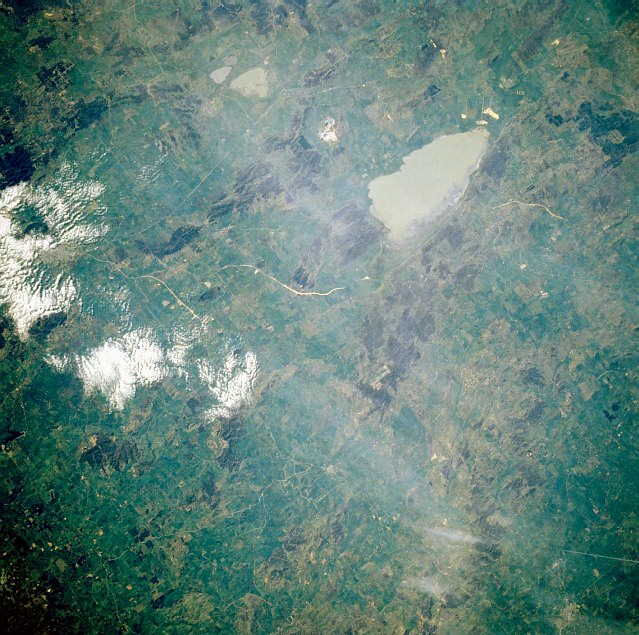
- Lake Bathurst at the top of the image, pictured in 1985, viewed from a Space Shuttle. The larger lake is Lake George.

- Location in New South Wales
- Location: Southern Tablelands, New South Wales
- Coordinates: 35°03′S 149°44′E
- Etymology: Earl Bathurst
- Basin countries: Australia
- Surface area: 2 to 10 km^{2} (0.77 to 3.86 sq mi)

Lake Bathurst (Ngunnawal–Gundungurra language: Bundong) is a shallow lake located 27 kilometres (17 mi) south-east of Goulburn, New South Wales in Australia. It is also the name of a nearby locality in the Goulburn Mulwaree Council.

== Features and location ==
The surface area of the lake can vary from 2 square kilometres (0.77 sq mi) up to 10 square kilometres (3.9 sq mi), depending on the inflow and evaporation rates.

The lake was named by surveyor James Meehan in honour of Earl Bathurst, Secretary of State for the Colonies, and the nearby village was named after the lake.

=== Birds ===
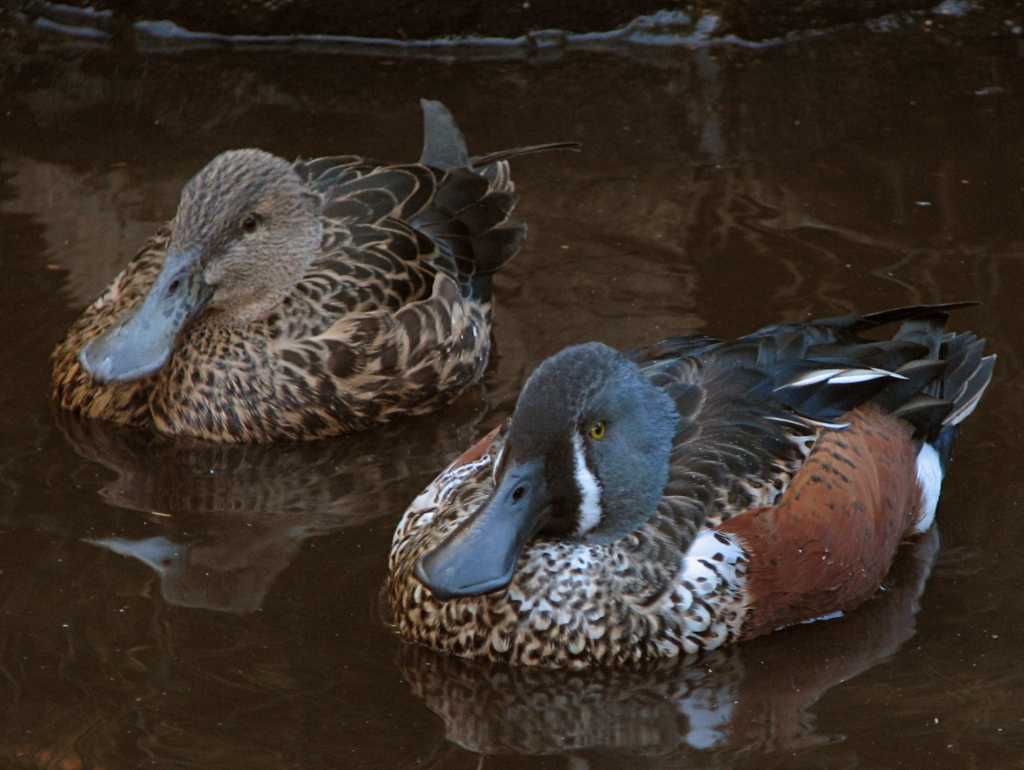
The lake is an important site for Australasian shovellers.

The lake is an important site for Australasian shovellers. A 19 square kilometres (7.3 sq mi) area of the lake and its immediate surrounds has been identified by BirdLife International as an Important Bird Area (IBA) because it regularly supports significant numbers of near threatened blue-billed ducks and over 1% of the world population of Australasian shovellers. It is an important drought refuge, sometimes supporting over 1% of the world populations of freckled ducks, black swans, chestnut teals and sharp-tailed sandpipers.

== Locality ==
Lake Bathurst
- Town
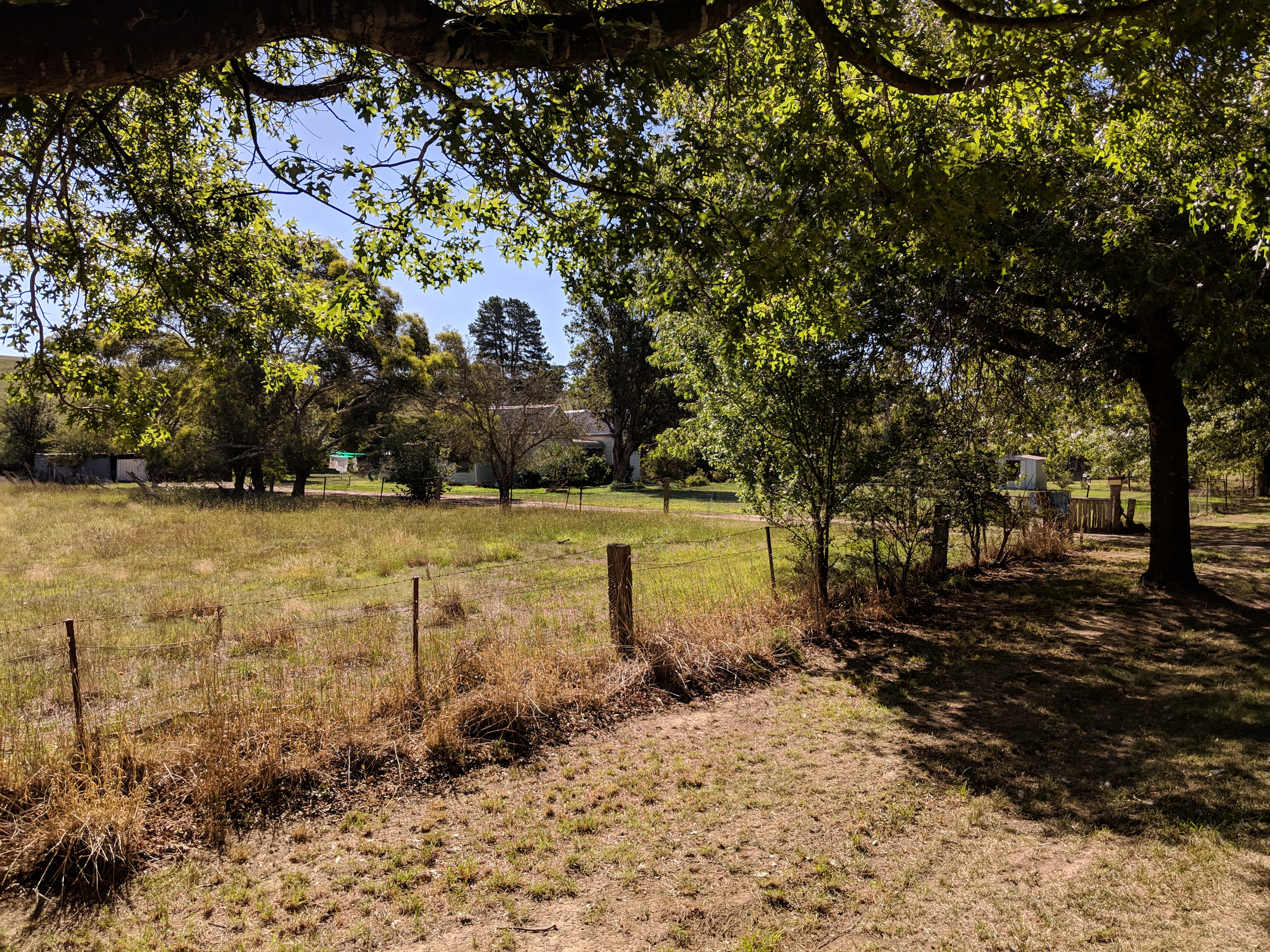

- Interactive map of Lake Bathurst
- Coordinates: 35°00′57″S 149°39′02″E
- Country: Australia
- State: New South Wales
- Region: Southern Tablelands
- LGA: Goulburn Mulwaree Council
- Location: 45 km (28 mi) S of Goulburn; 80 km (50 mi) NE of Canberra

Government
  - State electorate: Goulburn
  - Federal division: Eden-Monaro

Population
  - Total: 228 (2016 census)
- Postcode: 2580
- County: Argyle
- Parish: Covan
Localities around Lake Bathurst
Currawang	Tirrannaville	Quialigo
Currawang	Lake Bathurst	Windellama
Tarago	Tarago	Lower Boro

Lake Bathurst is also the name of a very small village, located on the Goulburn-Braidwood Road, 3 kilometres (1.9 mi) west of the lake. At the 2016 census, the Lake Bathurst area had a population of 228.

=== Lake Bathurst station ===
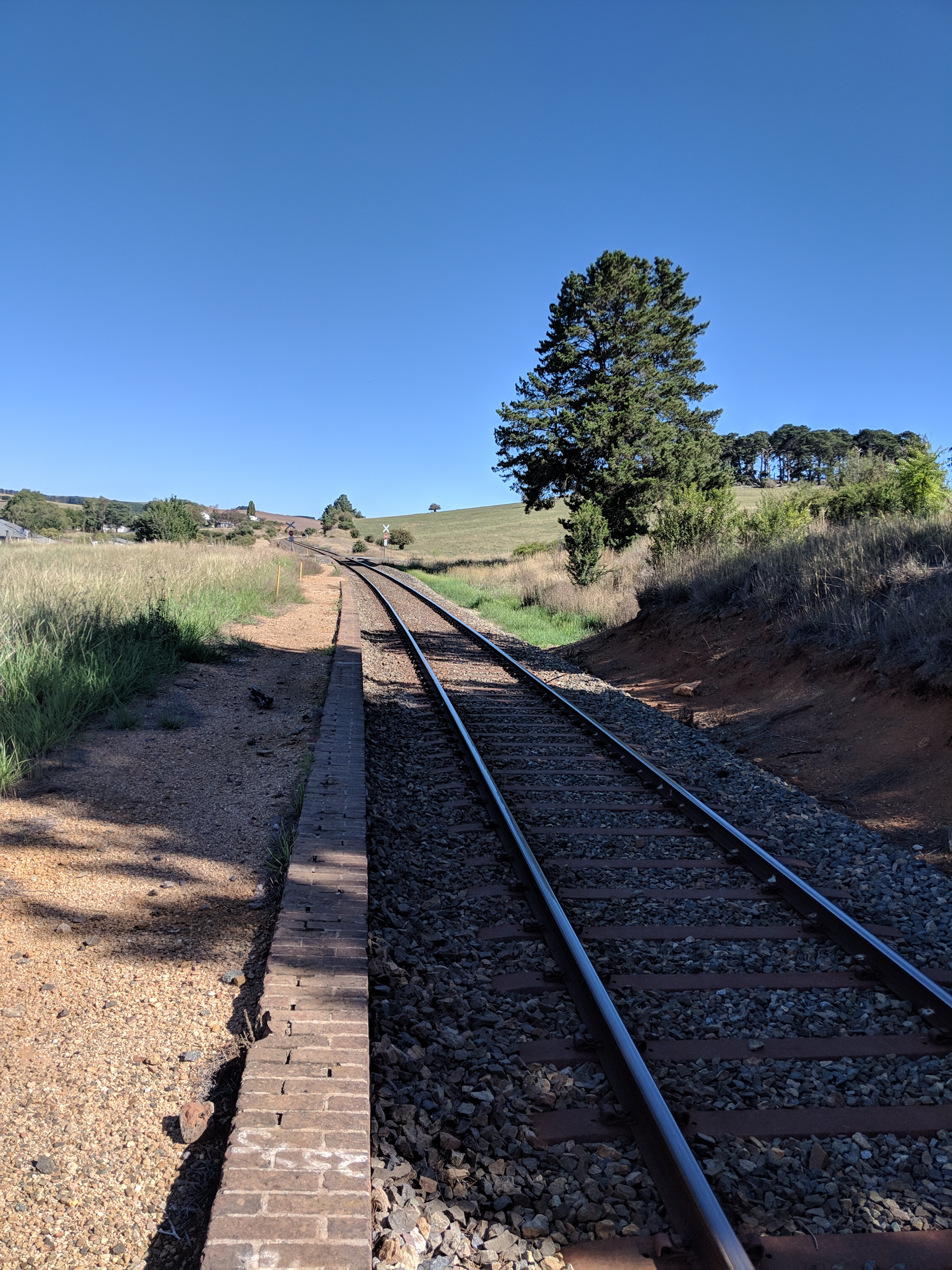
Site of former Lake Bathurst station

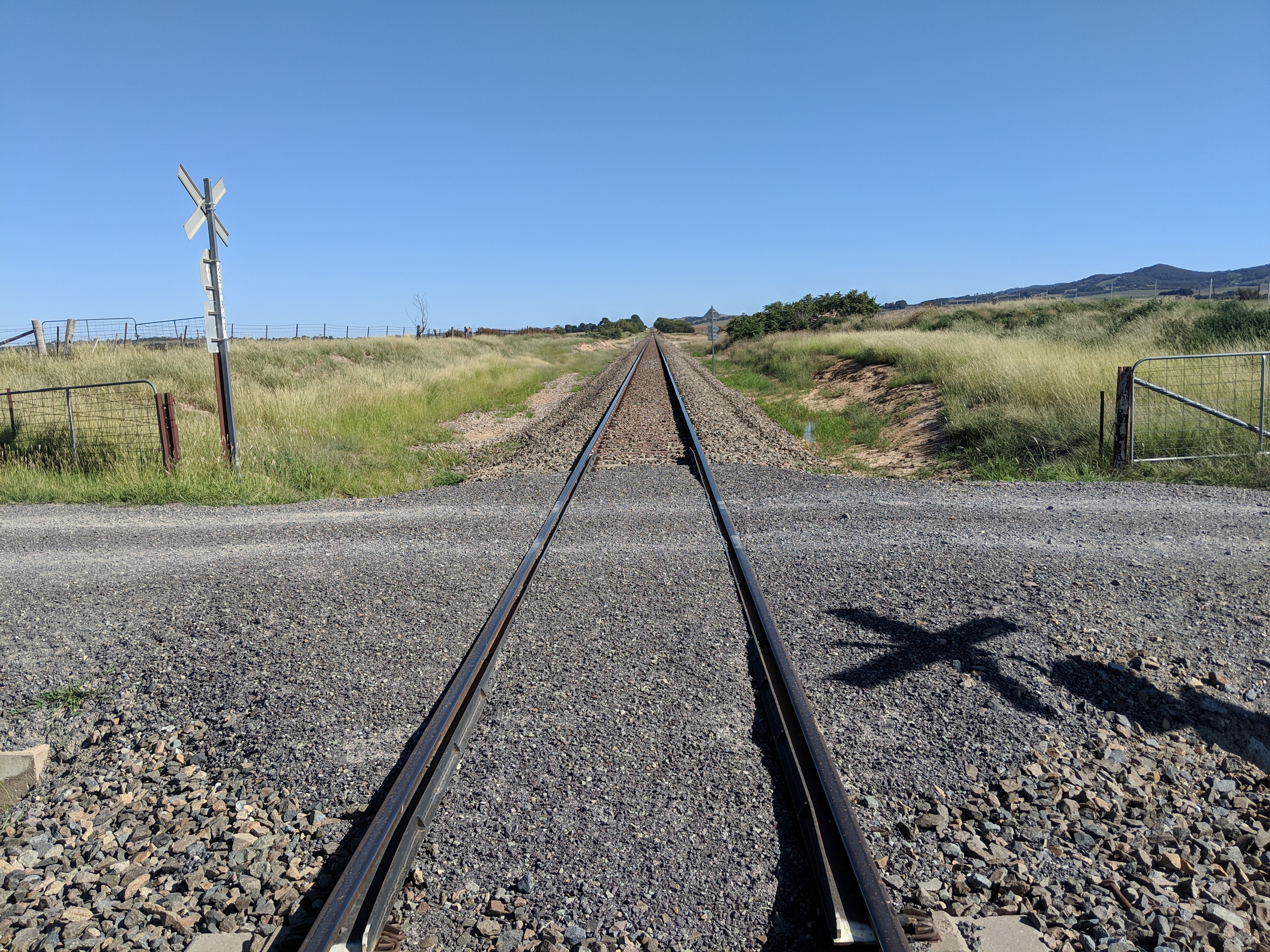
Site of Inverlochy station

Lake Bathurst had a railway station (35°00′54″S 149°38′53″E) on the Bombala railway line from 1884 to 1975.

=== Inveralochy station ===
Another station (34°57′56″S 149°38′51″E) was established under the name of Inveralochy in the northern part of the locality in 1890 and was closed in 1974.

=== Military history ===
During World War II, Lake Bathurst was the location of RAAF No.16 Inland Aircraft Fuel Depot (IAFD), completed in 1942 and closed on 29 August 1944. Usually consisting of 4 tanks, 31 fuel depots were built across Australia for the storage and supply of aircraft fuel for the RAAF and the US Army Air Forces at a total cost of £900,000 ($1,800,000).
