= Boxers Creek =

- Town
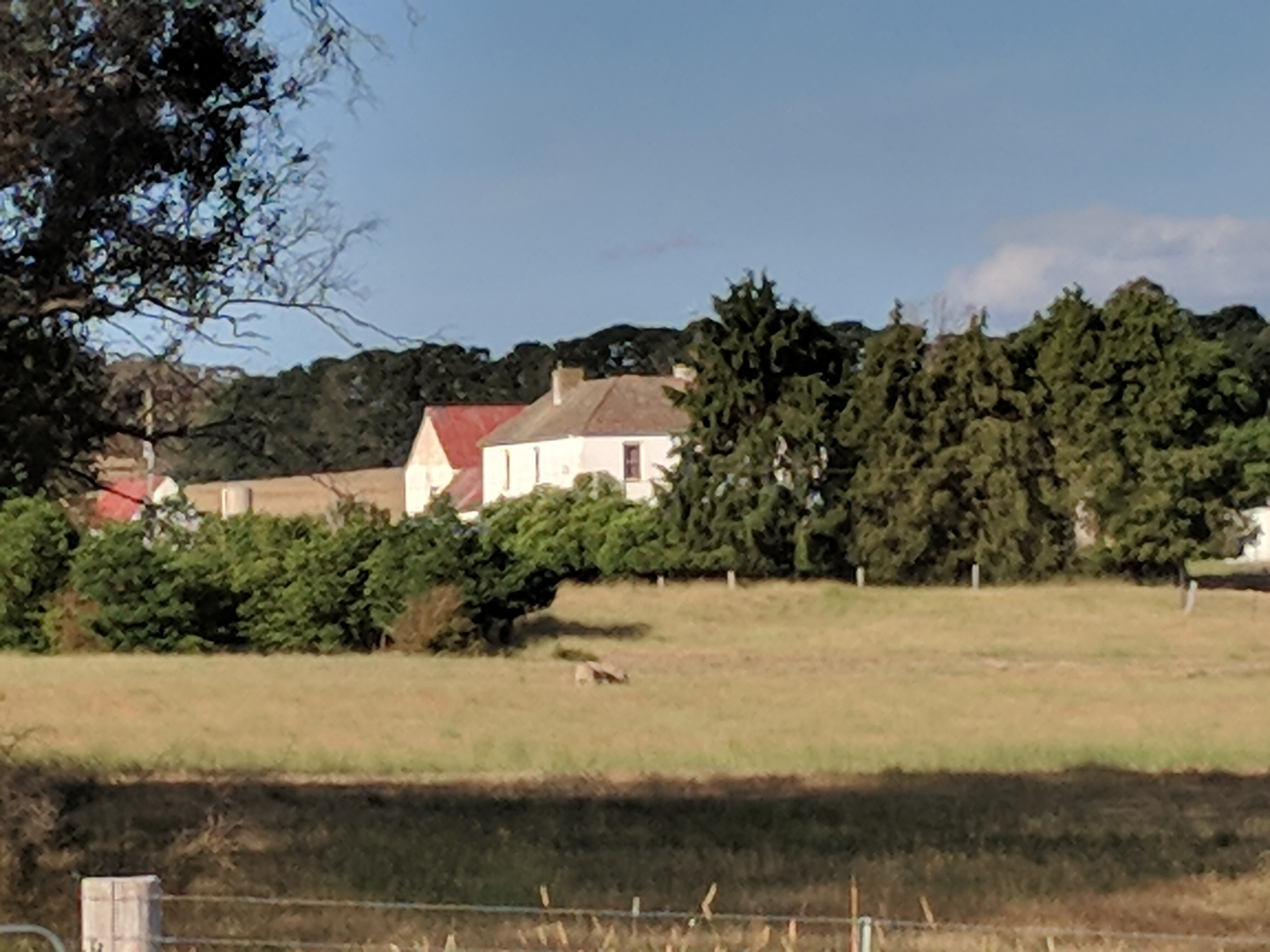

- Coordinates: 34°46′02″S 149°50′20″E
- Country: Australia
- State: New South Wales
- Region: Southern Tablelands
- LGA: Goulburn Mulwaree Council
- Location: 12 km (7.5 mi) E of Goulburn; 60 km (37 mi) WSW of Moss Vale; 185 km (115 mi) SW of Sydney

Government
  - State electorate: Goulburn
  - Federal division: Eden-Monaro
- Elevation: 720 m (2,360 ft)

Population
  - Total: 259 (SAL 2021)
- Postcode: 2580
- County: Argyle
- Parish: Nattery
Localities around Boxers Creek
Goulburn	Towrang	Carrick
Goulburn	Boxers Creek	Marulan
Brisbane Grove	Gundary	Bungonia

Boxers Creek is a locality in the Goulburn Mulwaree Council, New South Wales, Australia. It is located on the southern side of the Hume Highway to the east of Goulburn. At the 2016 census, it had a population of 226.
