= Windellama =

- Suburb
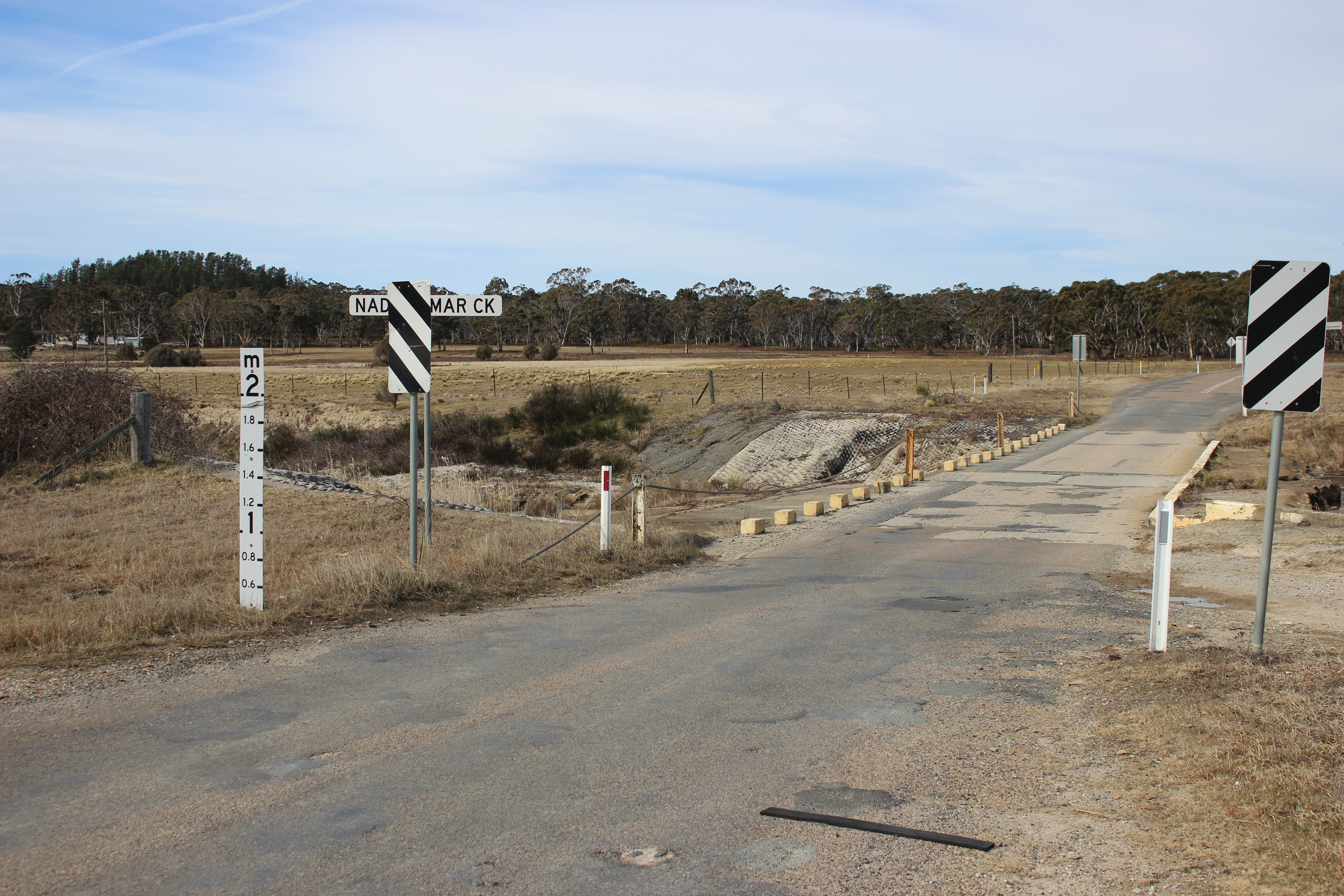
- Old Nadgigomar Creek bridge on Oallen Ford Road at the border of Windellama and Oallen in 2017. It was replaced by a higher bridge in 2018.

- Coordinates: 35°01′57″S 149°52′02″E
- Country: Australia
- State: New South Wales
- LGA: Goulburn Mulwaree Council
- Location: 46 km (29 mi) SE of Goulburn; 102 km (63 mi) NE of Canberra; 105 km (65 mi) W of Nowra; 208 km (129 mi) SSW of Sydney

Government
  - State electorate: Goulburn
  - Federal division: Eden-Monaro
- Elevation: 587 m (1,926 ft)

Population
  - Total: 417 (2021 census)
- Postcode: 2580
- County: Argyle
Suburbs around Windellama
Quialigo	Bungonia
Lake Bathurst	Windellama	Nerriga
Tarago	Oallen

Windellama (/wɪndəlɑːmə/) is a rural locality in the Southern Tablelands of New South Wales, Australia in the Goulburn Mulwaree Council. It is northeast of Canberra and southeast of Goulburn. At the 2021 census, it had a population of 417. Windellama is a popular location for people from Sydney to make a "tree change". This has created a change in property sizes in the area, previously mostly large agricultural enterprises, now on a multitude of 50–100 acres (20–40 ha) hobby farms.

It has a strong community with its own local monthly newspaper the "Windellama News", an active Historical Society, Progress Association, monthly farmer's market, Windellama Public School Parents and Citizens Association and Rural Fire Brigade.

== Windellama Community Hall ==
Windellama Community Hall, built in 1926, is the local community event centre where local markets and gatherings are held. The Windellama Hall Markets are held here every third Sunday of each month, and hosted by the Windellama Progress Association and Hall Incorporated. The Windellama Hall has also been designated by the NSW Rural Fire Service as a Neighbourhood Safer Place during bushfires.

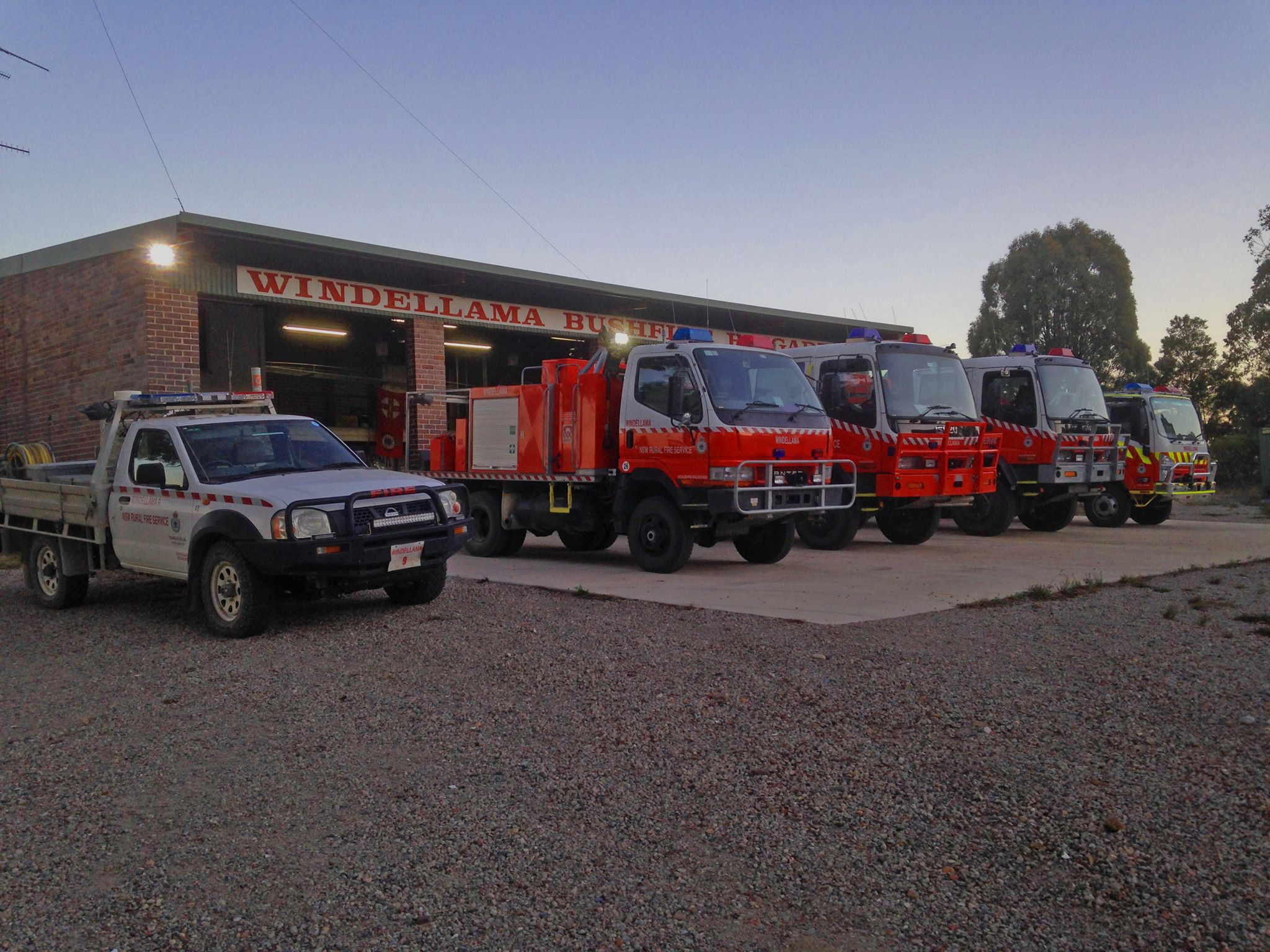
Windellama Rural Fire Brigade station and appliances in 2019

== Windellama Rural Fire Brigade ==
Established in 1942, Windellama Rural Fire Brigade has always been at the forefront of rural firefighting including one of the first brigades to use radios for fireground communications in 1946.

The Windellama Rural Fire Brigade has five firefighting appliances, over 100 volunteer members and responds all year round to bushfires, grass fires, structure fires, motor vehicle crashes, flood rescues and assisting in police and ambulance operations.

In May 2022, nineteen Windellama brigade members who had contributed to the unprecedented 2019–2020 bushfire crisis were presented with the National Emergency Medal by NSW RFS Superintendent Peter Alley and RFS Group Captain Des Kingston on behalf of His Excellency, the Governor General of the Commonwealth of Australia David Hurley. The medal is recognition, "on behalf of all Australians", for the outstanding contribution of Windellama Rural Fire Brigade volunteers who "provided sustained and significant response to a declared nationally significant emergency". The following Windellama brigade members, contributing a combined total of more than 550 days service during the 2019/2020 fires, were awarded National Emergency Medals: Captain Paul Alessi, Sharon Alessi, Wayne Back, Murray Browne, Michael Gazzard, Doug Gurney, Daniel Hansen, Tracey Keenan, Michael Lees, Bev McGaw, Danny McGaw, Scott Molloy, Peter Pokorny Doug Rollinson, Brett Roberts, Brendan Shannon, Thomas Shannon, Mick Still and Kym Wake.

In March 2022, Life Member Beverly McGaw received the inaugural Goulburn Mulwaree Award to recognise outstanding service or meritorious achievement by individuals to the community of the Goulburn Mulwaree Local Government area. Beverley McGaw has been recognised for her strong commitment to the Windellama community, especially the Rural Fire Brigade. Beverley joined the Rural Fire Brigade as a teenager, and has been an integral member of the brigade for over fifty years.

The 2021 NSW Volunteer of the Year Award recipient for the Southern Inland region was Senior Deputy Captain Brendan Shannon. Brendan worked on many of the larger fires during 2019 – 2020 fire season, spending almost 3 months off work fighting fires full-time. He was part of the Southern Tablelands strike team that provided flood relief on the mid-North Coast, clearing mud and furniture from over 50 flood damaged homes. Brendan manages the Brigade's Facebook page and Windellama Get Ready Days, as well as writing monthly articles for the Windellama Community Newsletter.

The 2019 NSW Young Volunteer of the Year Award for the South Coast/Southern Inland Award was Windellama Brigade Deputy Captain Thomas Shannon. Twenty-one-year-old Thomas Shannon was selected as the 2019 NSW Young Volunteer of the Year for the South Coast and Southern Tablelands for his outstanding volunteer rescue work assisting in lifesaving roadside rescues with his local fire brigade as well as joining a number of teams to fight fires throughout the region.

== Windellama Historical Society ==
The Windellama Historical Society is a community-driven group for maintaining the local history of the Windellama area. In November 2000, volunteer members built the Windellama Museum and Heritage Centre, which was a replica structure of the Windellama East Public School from 1880.

== Windellama Public School ==
Located on Windellama Rd, Windellama Public School is a small government-funded co-educational comprehensive primary day school with approximately 30 students and 2 full-time teachers. It offers education to students from Kindergarten to Year 6, with a library and Playgroup which is organised by local parents. In 2019 the school built a sensory garden for use of the students.

== Champion Cyclist ==
Matthew Hayman went to Windellama Public School 1983 to 1988 and lived at the property known as Minerva. Mathew Hayman (born 20 April 1978) is an Australian former professional road bicycle racer, who rode professionally between 2000 and 2019 for the Rabobank, Team Sky and Mitchelton–Scott teams. During his career, Hayman was an experienced and respected domestique, as he typically took on a supporting role within his team. Hayman won the road race in the 2006 Commonwealth Games. Hayman was also a specialist in the cobbled classics, and was the winner of what is widely agreed as the toughest professional one day race in the world - the Paris–Roubaix in 2016. He retired from racing after the 2019 Tour Down Under.

== First Australian Motor Cycle Grand Prix held in Windellama 1924 ==
The 1924 Australian Motor Cycle Grand Prix was the first of its kind in Australia. The triangular circuit extended from the outskirts of Goulburn to Windellama, across to Bungonia and back to the junction of the two roads. It involved four laps of the race circuit.

== First Australian Motor Racing Grand Prix Winner 1927 ==
Geoff Meredith, a sheep grazier from Windellama won Australia's first Motor Racing Grand Prix in 1927 held in Goulburn driving a Type 30 straight eight Bugatti. Meredith won again in the 1928 Australian Grand Prix at Phillip Island Victoria.

== WIRES Bat Flight Centre ==
In November 2017, the Holcim Bat Flight Centre was opened. Owned/Managed by the NSW Wildlife Information Rescue and Education Service and funded by Holcim Australia, this is the first New South Wales microbat aviary rehabilitation centre. It is designed for bats to recover from injuries, habitation loss, or have been orphaned before returning to the wild.

== St. Bartholomew's Anglican Church ==
St. Bartholomew's Anglican Church is located approximately 6 km from the Windellama Community Hall on Windellema Rd. Built in 1854, it has an on-site cemetery. A World War Memorial was built on 27 August 1995 to commemorate members from the district who were killed/died during their World War 1 or World War 2 service.

== Windellama State Emergency Service Unit ==
In 2015, four members of the Windellama State Emergency Service [SES] responded to an Australian Defence Force bus accident on Sandy Point Road, Windellama. NSW Police, NSW Fire and Rescue, NSW Ambulance and the Windellama Rural Fire Brigade also responded to the incident. On 19 June 2017, the four members; Kevin Muffett, Noel Sylvester, Margaret Burgoine and Graham Kinder, were awarded a NSW SES Commissioner's Unit Citation for responding.

== Nadgigomar Creek Bridge ==
Nadgigomar Creek Bridge was officially opened for use on 24 August 2018, and was part of the NSW and Australian Federal Government's Bridges Renewal Program. It crosses Nadgigomar Creek and was a replacement for an older bridge.
