= Tarago, New South Wales =

Tarago
- Town
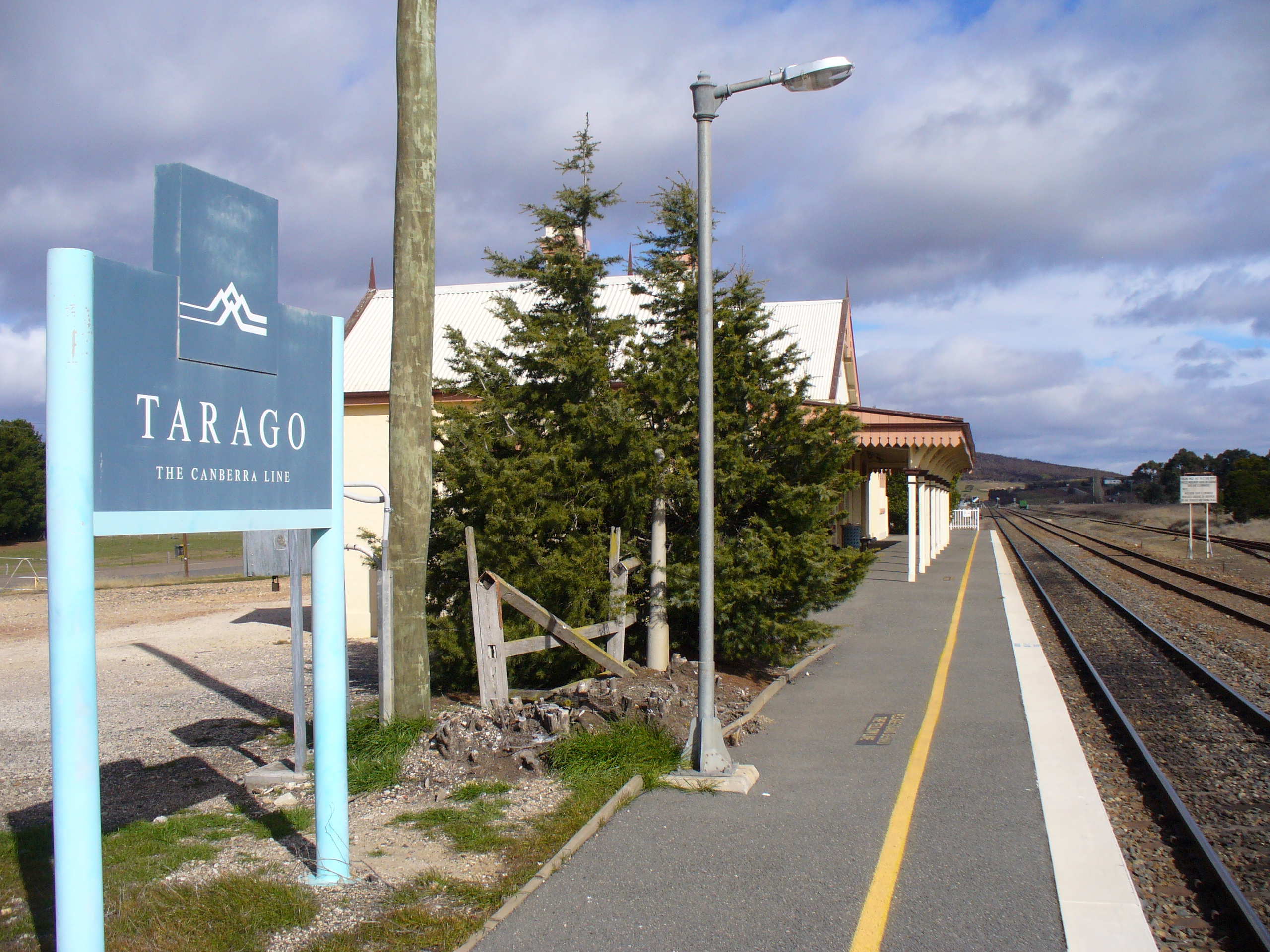
- Tarago railway station in July 2007

- Coordinates: 35°05′0″S 149°39′0″E
- Country: Australia
- State: New South Wales
- Region: Southern Tablelands
- LGAs: Goulburn Mulwaree Council; Queanbeyan–Palerang Regional Council
- Location: 222 km (138 mi) SW of Sydney; 32 km (20 mi) SW of Goulburn; 56 km (35 mi) NE of Queanbeyan; 69 km (43 mi) ENE of Canberra
- Established: 1827

Government
  - State electorate: Goulburn
  - Federal division: Eden-Monaro
- Elevation: 703 m (2,306 ft)

Population
  - Total: 510 (2021 census)
- Postcode: 2580
- County: Argyle
- Parish: Mulwaree
Localities around Tarago
Currawang	Lake Bathurst	Lake Bathurst
Lake George	Tarago	Lower Boro
Lake George	Bungendore	Mount Fairy

Tarago is a town in the Southern Tablelands of New South Wales, Australia in Goulburn Mulwaree Council. Part of the defined locality, which includes a large area of grazing country, is on the eastern shore of Lake George in the area of the Queanbeyan–Palerang Regional Council. The town is situated 39 km (24 mi) south of the city of Goulburn and 69 km (43 mi) northeast of Canberra, the capital city of Australia. It is located on the Goulburn-Braidwood road. The town is notable for recent renewable energy projects in the surrounding districts.

== History ==
The area is the traditional land of the Ngunnawal people, but was also traversed by other tribes going to the coast or the Monaro during the bogong moth season. Stone artefacts dating back 20,000 years have been found at nearby Lake George.

Lake Bathurst was discovered in April 1818 by chance on a journey of exploration commissioned by Governor Macquarie to find a route from the inland to the settlement on the south coast at Jervis Bay headed by Surveyor General James Meehan.

The town of Tarago was originally known as Sherwin's Flats, the town took the name "Tarago", possibly an Aboriginal word meaning "country", from the town presently known as Lake Bathurst, which is located 7 km north of Tarago. The name change coincided with the railway line's arrival and the opening of the station on 3 January 1884.

Within the town a number of historic buildings remain in use, including the original 1884 railway station, the St Josephs Catholic Church, and the Loaded Dog Hotel, which dates from 1848.

== Heritage listings ==
Tarago has a number of heritage-listed sites, including the Tarago railway station

== Mining and energy ==
=== Woodlawn Mine ===
The town of Tarago serves the adjoining large Woodlawn Mine site. The mine, which operated from 1978 to 1998 extracted gold, silver, copper, lead and zinc from deposits formed within the Lachlan Fold Belt. During the period of mining operations, goods sidings were added at the town's railway station to facilitate the transfer of minerals to and from the site. The closure of the mine came about when the operator, Denehurst Limited was placed in administration due to financial difficulties and subsequently sparked controversy when the pay entitlements of the 160 former miners, totalling $6.5 million, were not paid.

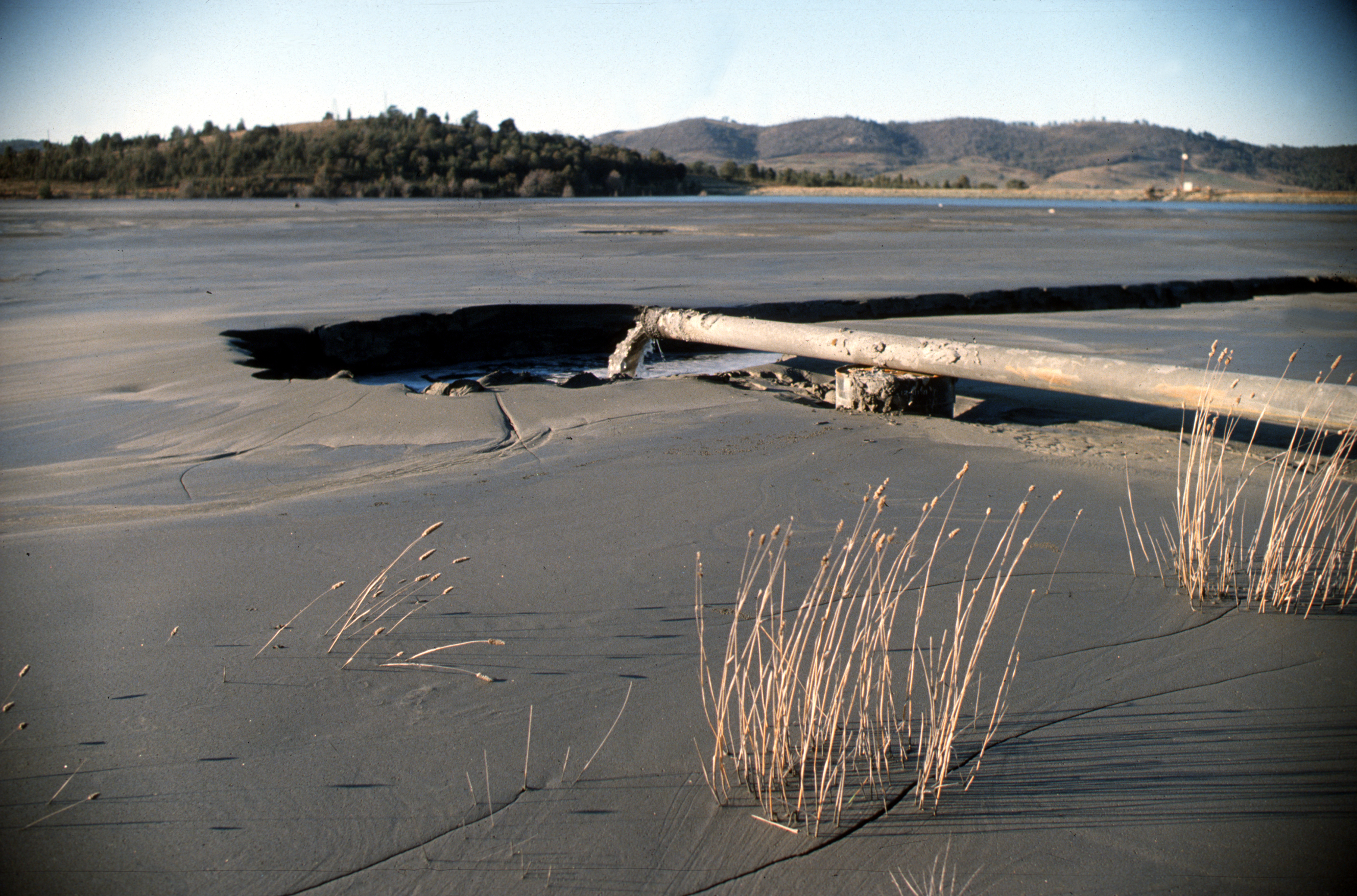
Woodlawn Mine

In 2012, Canadian-Australian mining company TriAusMin proposed reactivating the mine to potentially extract minerals at the site from both the three tailings dams and underground mine. The New South Wales Government announced on 8 July 2013 that the project had received final approval, with the $126 million investment creating up to 140 ongoing jobs.

=== Woodlawn Bioreactor ===
Waste company Collex (now Veolia) had examined both the Woodlawn site and others during the 1990s as a new site to house Sydney's waste, and eventually were given approval to use the site in 2002. As part of their agreement, Collex promised to pay out the workers' entitlements. They planned to run six 55-car trains a week between a waste transfer station in the Sydney suburb of Clyde and sidings off the Bombala railway line near the mine. These would take, at full capacity, 400,000 tonnes of putrescible waste a year, up to 20% of Sydney's waste. Since 1 July 2017, the Woodlawn Mechanical and Biological Treatment facility has received residual municipal waste (red-bin waste) from several local government areas in metropolitan Sydney. Participating councils have included the former municipalities of Ashfield, Leichhardt, Botany, Rockdale and Kogarah, as well as the Burwood, Waverley, Woollahra, Ku-ring-gai, Willoughby, North Sydney, Lane Cove and Hunters Hill local government areas. Following local government amalgamations, waste has also been received from the successor councils of Bayside Council and Georges River Council.

The project was highly controversial, especially in regard to the shipping of waste by train. Residents of Clyde and neighbouring Auburn in Sydney opposed the mine's approval on environmental grounds and took the company to court to try to stop the project. The New South Wales Land and Environment Court ruled in their favour, finding that the transfer station would cause significant air pollution problems. However, the court's decision was overturned by the New South Wales Government, led by Bob Carr, with bipartisan agreement by special legislation. The Government, in doing this, stressed the need for a new waste site for Sydney and the need to pay the mine workers' entitlements. The mine finally reopened on 7 September 2004, with mine workers receiving their entitlements shortly afterwards. An intermodal transfer station was built just outside the township of Tarago, at Crisps Creek.

Today, the mine site is being used for developments in green energy while still providing for Sydney's waste disposal. The owners of the mine, Veolia, plan to begin using the mine in late 2007 to harvest methane gas and use it for electricity to cut down the greenhouse gas emissions from the mine. The company also plans to use the organic waste in the site, once broken down, for fertiliser. In 2005, the Government also gave approval to Veolia to build a $96 million, 25-tower wind farm at the site, which would generate enough electricity to power 22,000 homes. However, as existing quotas on greenhouse gases at State and Commonwealth levels were being fulfilled at that time, the project was postponed in July 2006 until renewable energy targets were raised.

=== Woodlawn Wind Farm ===
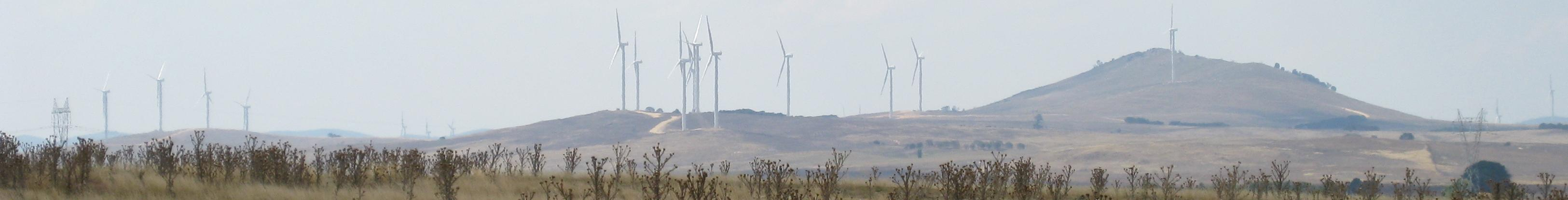
The Woodlawn Wind Farm

The Woodlawn Wind Farm is located approximately 4 km (2.5 mi) southwest of the town. The facility, constructed and operated by Infigen Energy consists of 23 wind turbines and was commissioned in November 2011.

== Transport ==
Tarago railway station is served by six daily NSW TrainLink Xplorer services, three in each direction operating between Sydney and Canberra.

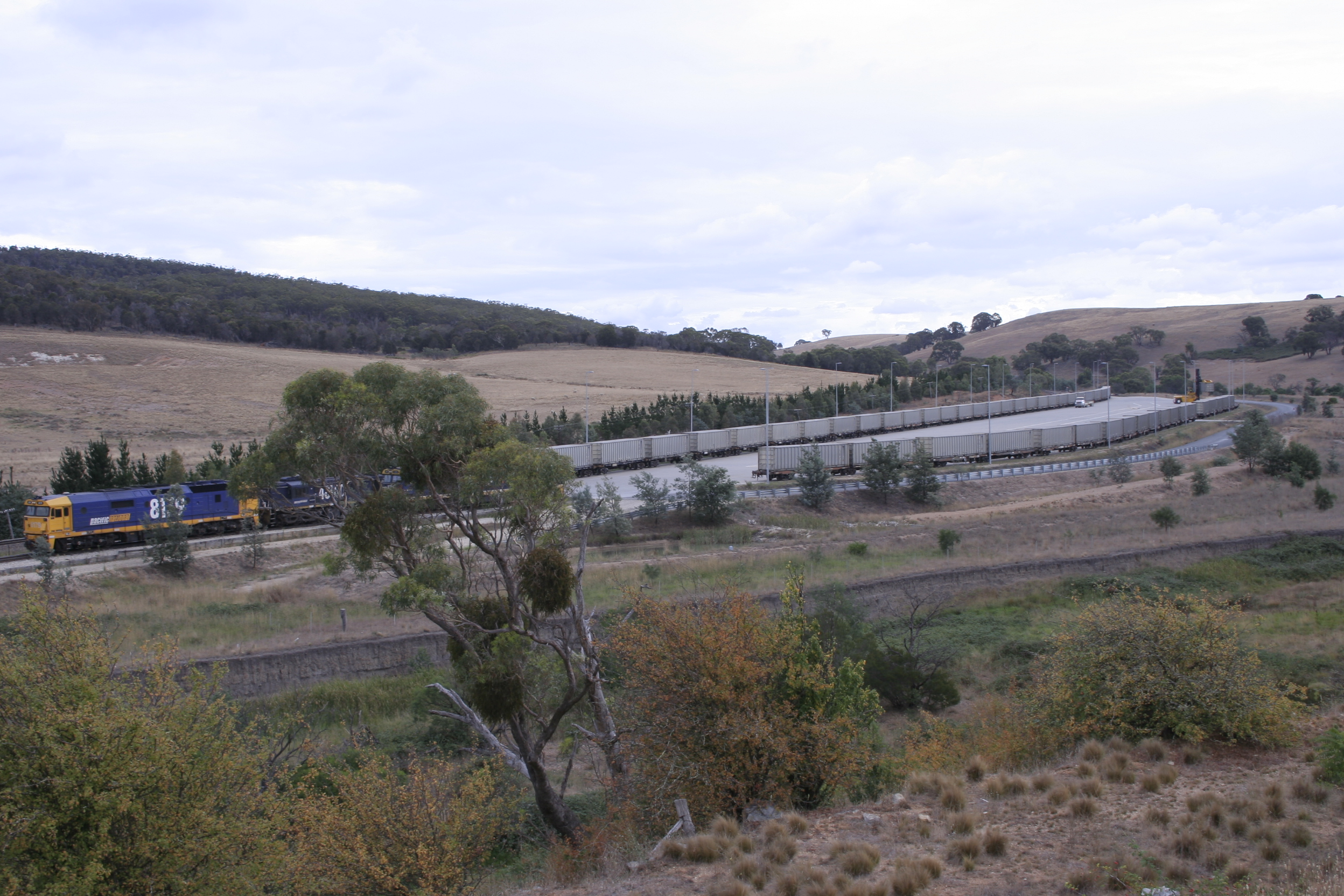
Intermodal transfer station

Situated east of Lake George and north of Bungendore, Tarago is some distance from both the Federal and Kings Highways, the major road transportation routes in the region. Historically, rail transport has provided an important link for the town. In October 2012, the New South Wales Government committed funding to a study into the potential extension of Main Road 92 - significantly upgraded between Nowra and Nerriga in 2010. One option considered in this study was to upgrade rural roads from Nerriga westwards across the Shoalhaven River to Tarago, then south to the Kings Highway at Bungendore. Despite no firm commitments to further construction, the reactivation of the Woodlawn mine has led to increased interest in the study, with the mine operator indicating road transport as the preferred option to move its product to ports on the coast, significantly increasing the number of heavy vehicles using local roads

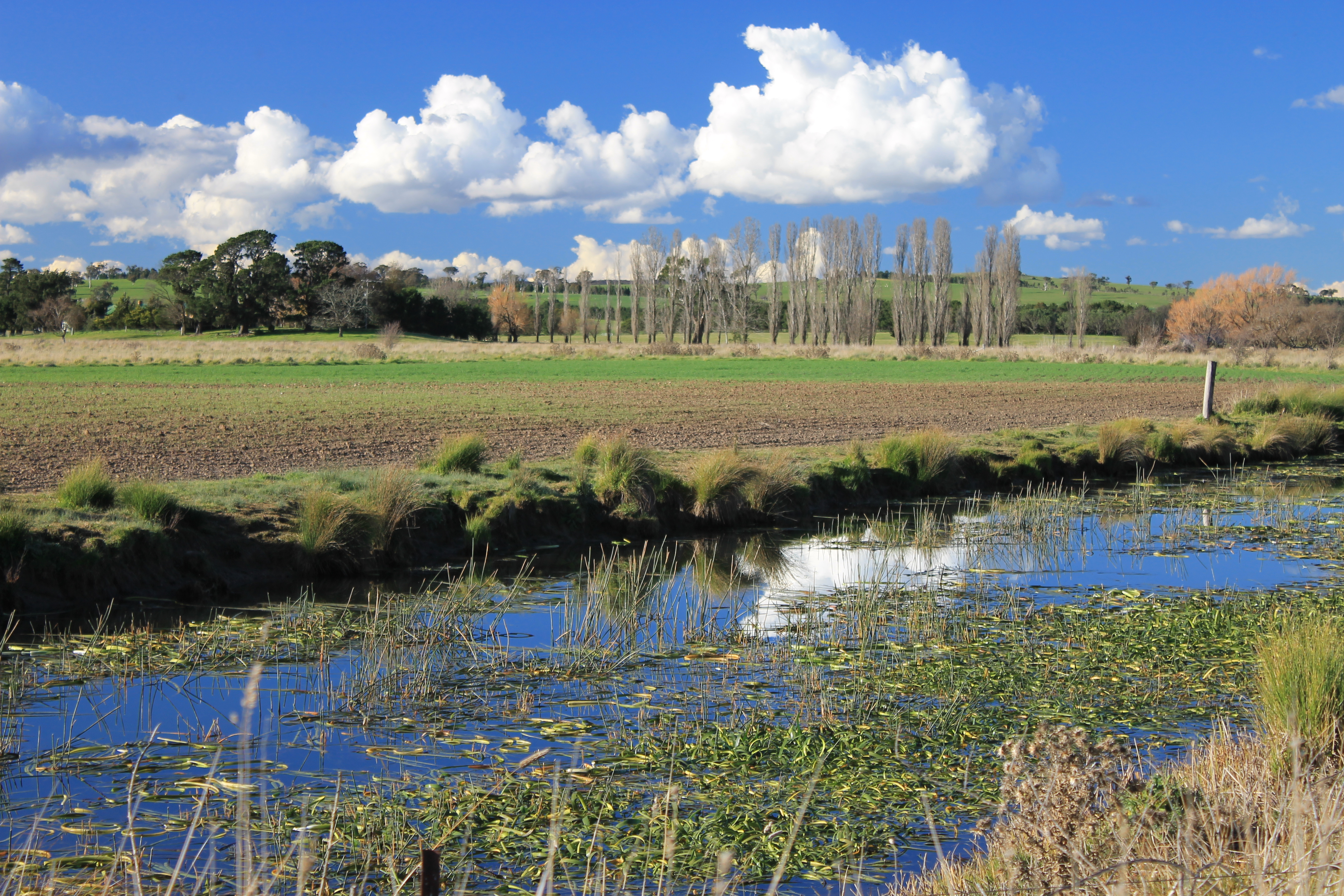
Agriculture in Tarago.

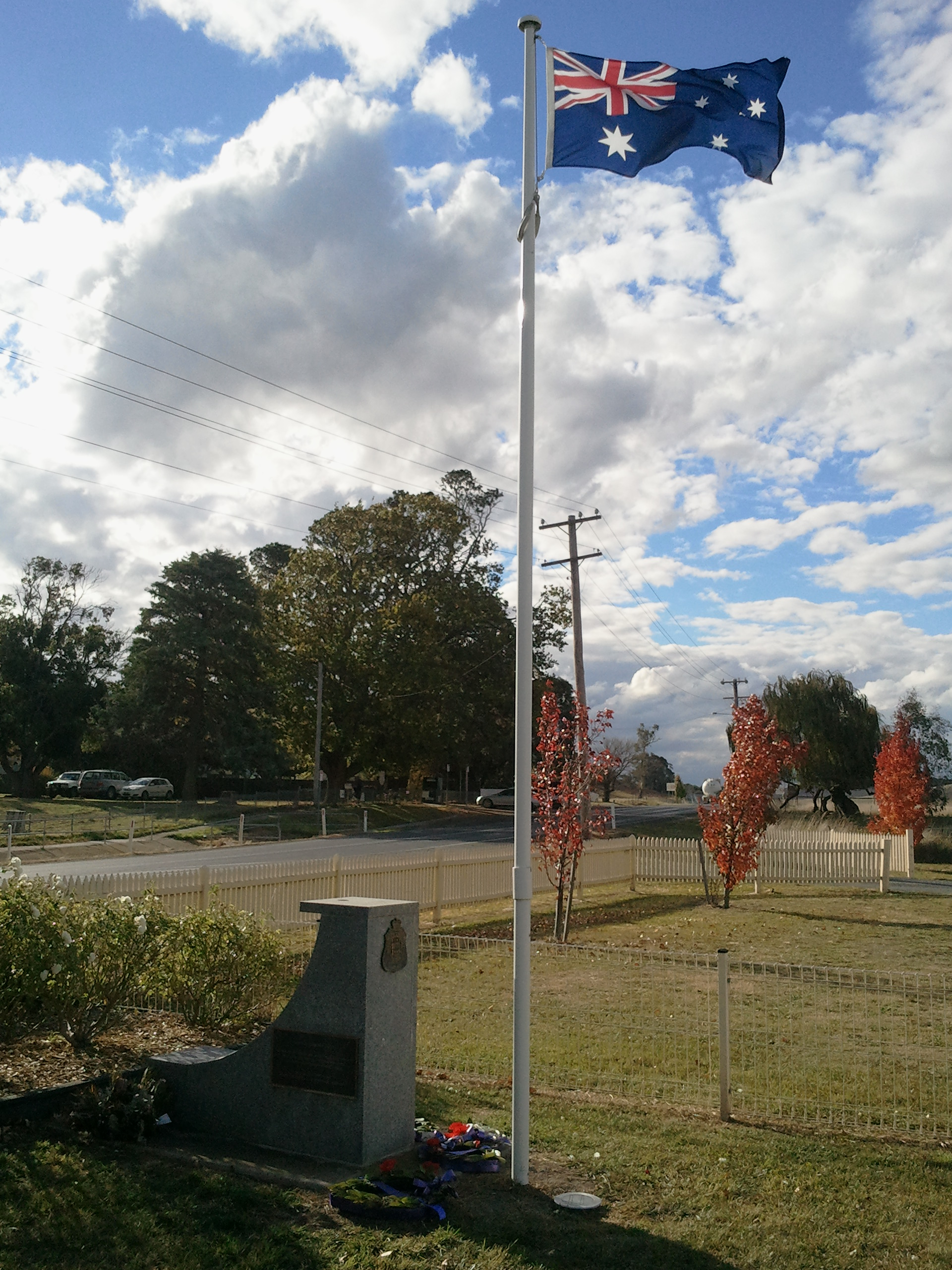
Tarago, war memorial.
