= Quialigo =

- Town
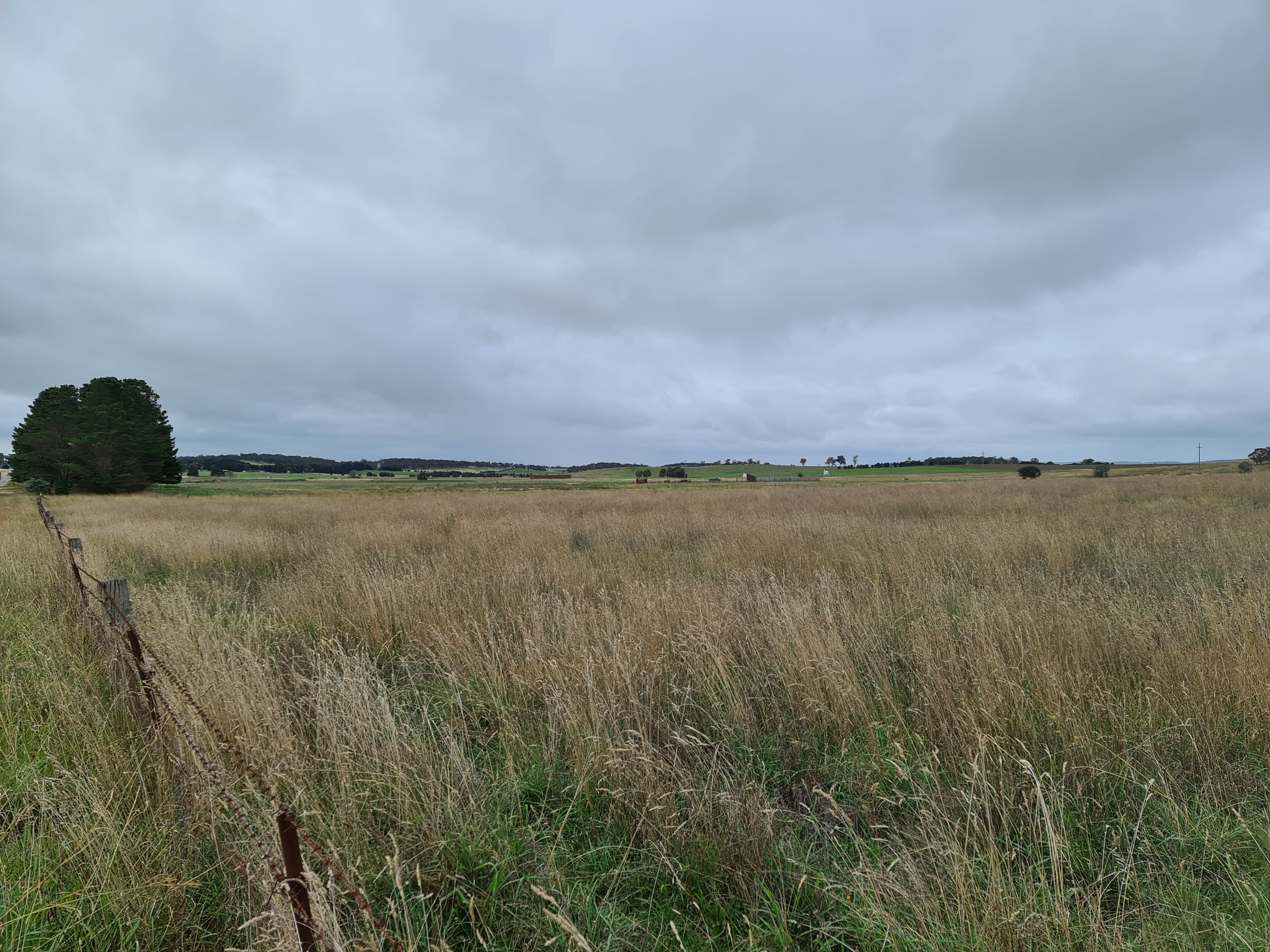

- Coordinates: 34°56′54″S 149°46′04″E
- Country: Australia
- State: New South Wales
- Region: Southern Tablelands
- LGA: Goulburn Mulwaree
- Location: 110 km (68 mi) NE of Canberra; 25 km (16 mi) S of Goulburn; 217 km (135 mi) SW of Sydney

Government
  - State electorate: Goulburn
  - Federal division: Eden-Monaro
- Elevation: 690 m (2,260 ft)

Population
  - Total: 292 (SAL 2021)
- Postcode: 2580
- County: Argyle
- Parish: Quialigo
Localities around Quialigo
Gundary	Gundary	Gundary
Tirrannaville	Quialigo	Windellama
Lake Bathurst	Lake Bathurst	Windellama

Quialigo (/kwɪæləɡoʊ/) is a locality in Goulburn Mulwaree Council in New South Wales, Australia. It lies about 25 km south of Goulburn on the road to Windellama and 110 km northeast of Canberra. At the 2016 census, it had a population of 253.

Quialigo had a state school from 1871 to 1877, 1902 to 1910 and 1917 to 1924. This was described at different times as a "half-time school" or a "provisional school".
