= Goulburn Airport =

- IATA: GUL; ICAO: YGLB

Summary
- Airport type: Public
- Owner: John Ferrara
- Serves: Goulburn
- Location: 59 Airport Road
- Elevation AMSL: 2,141 ft (653 m)
- Coordinates: 34°48′22″S 149°43′51″E
- Website: www.goulburnairport.com

Map
- Location in New South Wales

Runways
Direction	Length		Surface
Direction	m	ft	Surface
04/22	1,283	4,209	Asphalt
08/26	676	2,218	Grass
- Sources: AIP

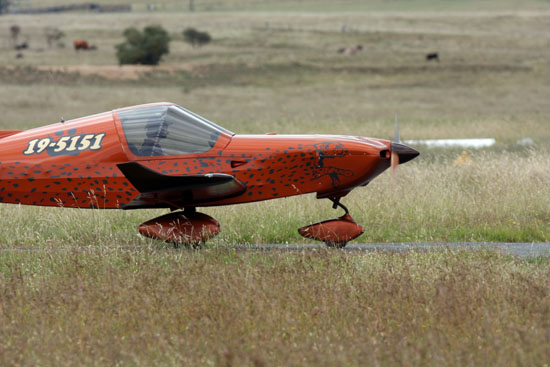
Plane at Goulburn Airport

Goulburn Airport (IATA: GUL, ICAO: YGLB) is a general aviation airport located 7 km (4.3 mi) south of Goulburn, New South Wales. Throughout the 1990s, suggestions were put forward to have Goulburn airport as a secondary international airport to service Sydney.

In 2007, the airport was advertised for sale by Goulburn Mulwaree Council. Terms to sell to George Tzovaras in 2009 were agreed, however the sale was never completed. In February 2011 the airport was sold to John Ferrara. Initially the airport was to be leased and operated by Ferrara for up to two years. Goulburn Airport has been under consideration as a freight hub for Canberra, as the city's international airport expands. In what is believed to be a first for an Australian airport, Goulburn airport has installed a series of hybrid wind and solar powered street light systems. In 2024, the airport was put up for sale.

== Airport Facilities ==
The primary runway is 04/22, with a paved surface measuring 1,283 m × 30 m (4,209 ft × 98 ft). 04/22 is equipped with pilot activated low intensity runway lighting. The secondary runway 08/26 measuring 676 m × 30 m (2,218 ft × 98 ft) is suitable for day operations only as it is not equipped with runway lighting and is unsealed.

There is no control tower located at the airport and pilots must co-ordinate arrivals and departures using a Common Traffic Advisory Frequency (127.15), aided by an Aerodrome Frequency Response Unit (AFRU), which notifies pilots that their transmissions have been received on the frequency and activates lighting systems as appropriate. The nearest radio navigation aid for pilots is the Goulburn Non-Directional Beacon installation located within the airport boundary. Fuel is available for piston, turbine and jet powered aircraft and an automated weather service (AWIS – 136.30) also operates at the airport.

=== Parachute Drop Zone ===
Adrenaline Skydive received permission from the New South Wales Parachute Council to begin operation as of 5 March 2011. Adrenaline Skydive is the closest student free-fall training facility to Canberra, offering tandem skydive packages, learn to skydive courses and ongoing training, coaching and advice for all experience levels. Their skydiving drop zone is located 45 minutes from Canberra.

Skydiving in Goulburn NSW was a successful and popular drop zone in the 90's attracting over 200 jumpers a weekend.

Adrenaline Skydive, started by Bill Tuddenham, first operated in the Newcastle / Hunter Valley, it was a successful tandem and student operation that attracted thousands of people from the area. John Ferarra – Now (CEO) of Adrenaline Skydive and owner of Goulburn Airport teamed up with Tuddenham to re-open the facility. It was a work in progress for over 9 years, approval in February 2011, and operations commencing in March 2011.

In August 2012, the NSW parachute council approved the appointment of Matt Chambers as chief instructor.

John Ferarra (CEO), Ken Enright (General Manager) and Chambers (Chief Instructor) have a vision to promote skydiving in the Canberra and surrounding area, giving the public opportunity experience free-fall as a tandem, offering students learning to skydive.

=== Flight Training ===
Goulburn Flight Training Centre is based at Goulburn Airport, operating a fleet consisting of Twin Turbine Embraer EMB110, Skyfox Gazelles, Cessna 150, Cessna 172RG, Cessna 182, Piper Cherokee, Beechcraft Duchess and Grumman aircraft. The centre is certified to provide training in both Recreational Aviation and General Aviation Private Pilot and Commercial Pilot licensing.

Goulburn Aviation also has its home at Goulburn Airport with a satellite base at nearby Canberra Airport. For flight training they use the Piper Warrior while also having available to hire a Cessna Hawk XP, Piper Archer, and Jabiru J170. Goulburn Aviation has been providing flying training since 1993.

== Rural Fire Service ==
The airport is occasionally used by the NSW Rural Fire Service for loading retardant and refueling fire bombing aircraft.

== Accidents and incidents ==
- 20 November 2010 – A 48-year-old Goulburn man was killed on Saturday evening when his aircraft crashed just 250m after taking off from Goulburn airport.
- 29 January 2012 – A pilot and his passenger escaped serious injury when their vintage De Havilland Chipmunk aircraft crashed shortly after take-off from Goulburn Airport.
- 21 November 2015 – Tony Rokov, 44, a skydiving instructor, died during a tandem jump. The tandem jumper, a 14-year-old boy was critically injured and airlifted to hospital. A gust of wind caused the parachute canopy to collapse and the jumpers fell from approximately 20 metres (66 ft). Rokov is credited with protecting the boy with his own body.
- 28 December 2015 – A 44-year-old skydiver from Sydney was killed.
- 27 June 2021 – A 32-year-old skydiver and 37-year-old instructor, from Canberra and Sydney respectively, died when their equipment got caught on the plane from which they were jumping. Subsequent investigations and court proceedings found that the airport operator and its director had breached workplace safety duties, with the NSW District Court imposing fines totalling $250,000.

== Sale and market activity ==
In 2024, Goulburn Airport was offered for sale after more than a decade under private ownership. The campaign attracted interest from private and institutional buyers. The sale process was managed by the real estate agency Ashby York, with agent Steven Westlake overseeing the campaign.
