= Parish of Goulburn =

Goulburn Parish
- Cadastral division
- Coordinates: 34°46′S 149°42′E
- Country: Australia
- State: New South Wales
- LGA: Goulburn Mulwaree
- County: Argyle
- Division: Eastern
Lands administrative divisions around Goulburn Parish
Narrangarril	Narrangarril	Towrang
Bredalbane	Goulburn Parish	Towrang
Wologorong	Gundary	Gundary

The Parish of Goulburn is a parish of Argyle County which includes most of the city of Goulburn, New South Wales.

== Geography ==
It is bounded by the Wollondilly River to the north. The central area of Goulburn is in the parish, however some outlying suburbs are not, such as Bradfordville and Kenmore which are in Narrangarril, and North Goulburn which is in Towrang parish. Mulwarree ponds is the eastern boundary near Goulburn, although the parish also includes some land to the east of this river further south, including the airport. Some land to the south and west of the city is also included in the parish, including Brisbane Grove and Tirrannaville. The junction of the Goulburn-Yass and Goulburn-Canberra railway lines is located in this parish, as is the Goulburn railway station. The western boundary is near Coles Lane. The Federal Highway and the Hume Highway, intersection near the southern boundary of the parish, south of Goulburn. The parish is also the seat of both Anglican and Roman Catholic Archdiocese of Canberra and Goulburn.

== History ==
The area was first inhabited by the Gundungurra people, and by the mid-1840s the NSW colonial government had granted numerous land grants in area, beginning white settlement.
