= Goulburn Mulwaree Council =

- Local government area
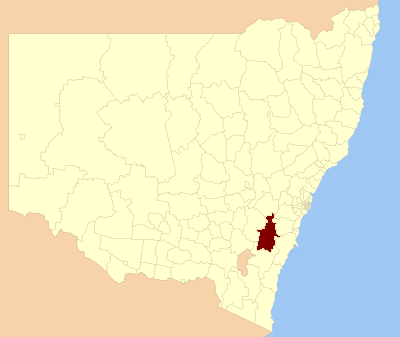
- Location in New South Wales

- Interactive map of Goulburn Mulwaree Council
- Coordinates: 34°44′S 149°44′E
- Country: Australia
- State: New South Wales
- Region: Southern Tablelands
- Established: 11 February 2004
- Council seat: Goulburn

Government
  - Mayor: Nina Dillon
  - State electorate: Goulburn
  - Federal division: Eden-Monaro

Area
  - Total: 3,220 km^{2} (1,240 sq mi)

Population
  - Total: 32,053 (2021 census)
  - Density: 9.954/km^{2} (25.78/sq mi)
- Website: Goulburn Mulwaree Council
LGAs around Goulburn Mulwaree Council
| Upper Lachlan | Upper Lachlan | Wingecarribee |
| Yass Valley | Goulburn Mulwaree Council | Shoalhaven |
| Queanbeyan–Palerang | Queanbeyan–Palerang | Shoalhaven |

Goulburn Mulwaree Council is a local government area located in the Southern Tablelands region of New South Wales, Australia. The area is located adjacent to the Hume Highway and the Southern Highlands railway line. The estimated resident population of the area stood at 32,053 on 2021 census.

The mayor of Goulburn Mulwaree Council is Nina Dillon.

== Cities, towns and localities ==
The area covered under administration is 3,220 square kilometres (1,240 sq mi) and includes Goulburn and the towns and localities of:

- Baw Baw
- Boxers Creek
- Brisbane Grove
- Bungonia
- Carrick
- Currawang (part)
- Gundary
- Kingsdale
- Lake Bathurst
- Lower Boro
- Marulan
- Mummel
- Oallen
- Parkesbourne
- Pomeroy (part)
- Quialigo
- Run-O-Waters
- Tallong
- Tarago
- Tarlo (part)
- Tirrannaville
- Towrang
- Wayo (part)
- Windellama
- Wingello (part)
- Wollogorang (part)
- Yarra

Parts of the Southern Highlands, the Southern Tablelands and Morton National Park lie within the Goulburn Mulwaree Council area.

== History ==
The oldest habitation sites discovered in the region date back more than 3000–5000 years ago. Two distinct Aboriginal language groups were identified in the region when the Europeans initiated contact. These were the Gundungurra and the Ngunnawal groups, which were connected through common beliefs and culture. These groups are the traditional owners of the Goulburn Mulwaree local government area and the area is a meeting place of the two groups, with the Gundungurra to the north and the Ngunnawal to the south. Muniwarung is "meeting place" in the Gundungurra language.

The first Europeans to visit Goulburn Mulwaree were John Wilson and John Price. Properties were established here during 1817–1820 due to the grazing potential of the Southern Tablelands.

== Municipal history ==
The council was formed in 2004 as the Greater Argyle Council, an amalgamation of Goulburn City and parts of the former Mulwaree Shire. It was renamed in 2005 to Goulburn Mulwaree Council.

== Controversies ==
During 2011–2013, Goulburn Mulwaree Council has been at the centre of alleged breaches of NSW Council Rules and Regulations. In late 2013, a Government investigation by the New South Wales State Government found that the Goulburn Mulwaree Council's Multi-Use Centre Tendering Process breached established State Regulations, ruling that: "[Goulburn Mulwaree] Council contravened regulations, ignored tendering guidelines and offered unfair advantage to two tenderers including the successful tenderer, Bathurst firm, Hines Constructions." The Investigation prompted multiple Council Internal Reform suggestions, as well as prompting the council's General Manager Performance Review Committee to suspend the automatic employment renewal of Mr Chris Berry, the then General Manager of Goulburn Mulwaree Council, in September 2013.

In 2011, Goulburn Mulwaree Council partnered with Veolia Environmental Services in seed funding to make up $10,000 for an art award through the Goulburn Regional Art Gallery. The Award, known as the Veolia Environmental Services Art Award, prompted condemnation from the peak body for Australian visual and media arts (The National Association for Visual Artists or NAVA), as well as an independent investigation after multiple complaints alleging the winning entry breached the stipulated entry conditions. The Investigation, completed by Planning, Environmental and Economic Consulting, resulted in a 22-page report where: "The consultant recommended that Council make a public statement to acknowledge grievances and the necessary improvements. Secondly, gallery staff should be proactive in engaging professionals, galleries and judges to develop and benchmark the entry and judging criteria." Veolia Environmental Services discontinued its annual $10,000 support for the Award in 2012.

== Council ==
=== Current composition and election method ===
Goulburn Mulwaree Council is composed of nine councillors elected proportionally as one entire ward. All councillors are elected for a fixed four-year term of office. The mayor is elected by the councillors at the first meeting of the council.

== Election results ==
=== 2024 ===
2024 New South Wales local elections: Goulburn Mulwaree
| Party | Candidate | Votes | % | ±% |
|---|---|---|---|---|
| Dillon Group | 1. Nina Dillon (elected 1); 2. Christopher O'Mahony (elected 4); 3. Keith Smith (elected 5); 4. Chloe Hurley; 5. Paul Kemp | 6,565 | 36.0 | |
| Labor | 1. Jason Shepard (elected 2); 2. Liz McKeon (elected 9); 3. Danielle Marsden-Ballard; 4. Anna Wurth-Crawford; 5. James Corbett | 3,190 | 17.5 | +0.1 |
| Independent | Bob Kirk (elected 3) | 2,303 | 12.6 | −10.4 |
| Independent | Caitlin Flint (elected 6) | 1,280 | 7.0 | |
| Independent | Michael Prevedello (elected 7) | 1,118 | 6.1 | −2.8 |
| Shooters, Fishers, Farmers | Andy Wood | 761 | 4.2 | −3.1 |
| Independent | Samuel Ross | 714 | 3.9 | |
| Independent | Steven Ruddell | 563 | 3.1 | −1.7 |
| Independent | Daniel Strickland (elected 8) | 537 | 2.9 | −5.3 |
| Independent | Carol James | 415 | 2.3 | −3.8 |
| Independent | Adrian Beresford-Wylie | 356 | 2.0 | |
| Independent | Matthew Kane | 189 | 1.0 | |
| Independent | Richard Orchard | 168 | 0.9 | |
| Independent | Shaun Allen | 79 | 0.4 | |
| Total formal votes | | 18,238 | 91.2 | |
| Informal votes | | 1,755 | 8.8 | |
| Turnout | | 19,993 | 88.3 | |

=== 2021 ===
2021 New South Wales local elections: Goulburn Mulwaree
| Party | Candidate | Votes | % | ±% |
|---|---|---|---|---|
| Independent | Bob Kirk (elected) | 4,000 | 23.0 | |
| Labor | 1. Jason Shephard (elected); 2. Anna Wurth-Crawford; 3. Danielle Marsden-Ballard; 4. Warren Murray; 5. Nathan Smith | 3,017 | 17.3 | |
| Independent | Michael Prevedello (elected) | 1,554 | 8.9 | |
| Independent | Daniel Strickland (elected) | 1,425 | 8.2 | |
| Shooters, Fishers, Farmers | Andy Wood (elected) | 1,268 | 7.3 | |
| Independent | James Carol (elected) | 1,056 | 6.1 | |
| Independent | Peter Walker (elected) | 1,030 | 5.9 | |
| Independent | Steven Ruddell (elected) | 1,003 | 5.8 | |
| Independent | Andrew Banfield (elected) | 878 | 5.0 | |
| Greens | Leah Ferrara | 816 | 4.7 | |
| Independent | Margaret O'Neill | 774 | 4.4 | |
| Independent | Timothy Dally | 382 | 2.2 | |
| Independent | Adam Milani | 191 | 1.1 | |
| Total formal votes | | 17,394 | 92.0 | |
| Informal votes | | 1,519 | 8.0 | |
| Turnout | | 18,913 | 87.8 | |
