= Southern Tablelands =

Region in New South Wales, Australia

- Region
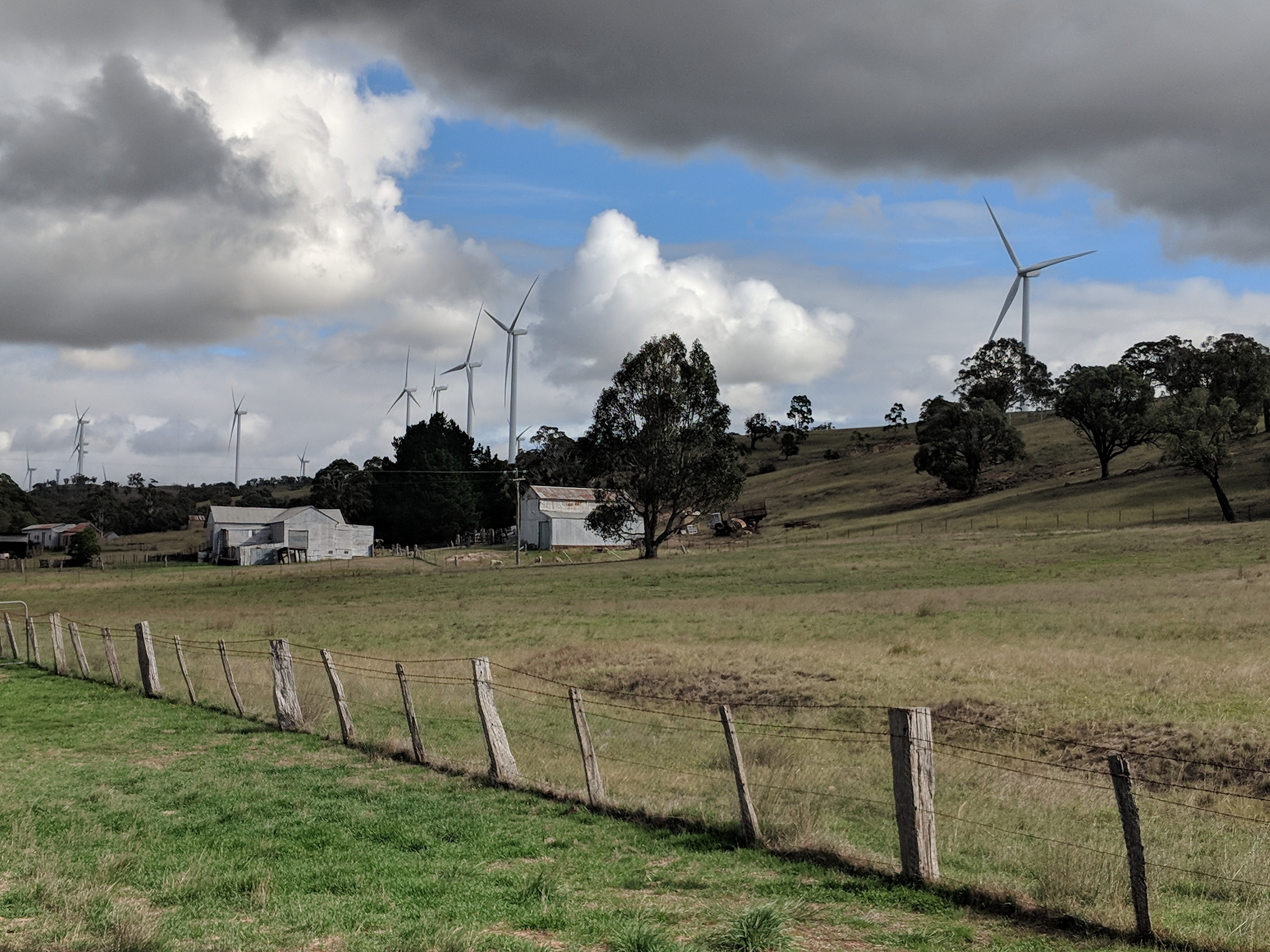
- Country: Australia
- State: New South Wales
- Region: Capital Country
- LGAs: Goulburn Mulwaree; Hilltops; Queanbeyan-Palerang; Upper Lachlan; Yass Valley

Government
  - State electorates: Goulburn; Cootamundra; Monaro
  - Federal divisions: Eden-Monaro; Riverina
Regions around Southern Tablelands
| Central West | Blue Mountains | Macarthur, Southern Highlands |
| South West Slopes | Southern Tablelands | South Coast |
| ACT, Riverina | Monaro | South Coast |

The Southern Tablelands is a geographic area of New South Wales, Australia, located south-west of Sydney and generally west of the Great Dividing Range.

The area is characterised by high, flat country which has generally been extensively cleared and used for grazing purposes. The area is easily accessible to the Australian federal capital city of Canberra in the Australian Capital Territory. The area is included with the Southern Highlands and parts of the South West Slopes in the district that is known as Capital Country. In a wider sense, the term "Southern Tablelands" is also sometimes used to describe a broader region that includes the Monaro, the Southern Highlands and Australia's capital Canberra. The Southern Tablelands Temperate Grassland is a prominent vegetation community in the region.

== Media ==
93.5 Eagle FM, a radio station based in Goulburn, broadcasts to the majority of the Southern Tablelands. In terms of ABC Local Radio, Goulburn is covered by ABC Central West and Yass is served by ABC Radio Canberra.

== Transport ==
=== Air ===
Goulburn Airport is only airport in the region but only serves General aviation with no passenger flights to and from the airport. However, Canberra Airport is mostly used by residents from the region.

== See also ==
- Regions of New South Wales
