= Colonial Mutual Life Building =

Colonial Mutual Life Building may refer to the following buildings in Australia:

- Colonial Mutual Life building, Adelaide
- Colonial Mutual Life Building, Brisbane
- Colonial Mutual Life building, Dubbo
- Colonial Mutual Life Building, Goulburn
- Colonial Mutual Life Building, Hobart
