= Goulburn Viaduct =

- Coordinates: 34°44′58″S 149°44′02″E
- Carries: Main Southern Line
- Crosses: Mulwaree River
- Locale: Goulburn, Goulburn Mulwaree Council, New South Wales, Australia
- Begins: North Goulburn (north-east)
- Ends: Goulburn (south-west)
- Owner: Transport Asset Manager of New South Wales

Characteristics
- Design: Arch viaduct
- Material: Brick
- Longest span: 13.1 metres (43 ft)
- No. of spans: 13

History
- Contracted lead designer: New South Wales Government Railways
- Construction end: 1915

New South Wales Heritage Register
- Official name: Goulburn Viaduct (Mulwaree Ponds); Mulwaree River Railway Viaduct
- Type: State heritage (built)
- Designated: 2 April 1999
- Reference no.: 1035
- Type: Railway Bridge/Viaduct
- Category: Transport – Rail
- Builders: Day Labour

Location
- Interactive map of Goulburn Viaduct

The Goulburn Viaduct is a heritage-listed railway bridge that carries the Main Southern railway line across the Mulwaree River at Goulburn, in the Southern Tablelands region of New South Wales, Australia. It was built in 1915. It is also known as Mulwaree River Railway Viaduct. The property is owned by Transport Asset Manager of New South Wales, an agency of the Government of New South Wales. It was added to the New South Wales State Heritage Register on 2 April 1999.

== History ==
By the early 1900s much of the original single track railways in New South Wales had become inadequate for railway operations, particularly the busy Main Lines (South, West and North) through the Great Dividing Range. Plans were made to duplicate the tracks and at the same time ease the original steep grades and sharp curves, usually all achieved by deviation works.

It was a major programme beginning in 1910 and continuing to 1923. The dominant bridge building material was bricks, mostly from the 1912 State Brickworks at Homebush and mostly in the form of brick arches. This was due to (a) a general lack of expensive imported steel and (b) a long-standing government policy to see local materials used as much as possible. Even for short spans, 6.1 m (20 feet) and 9.14 m (30 feet), where a simple steel plate web girder would have been the norm, brick arches were built.

The quantity of bricks used in the programme was enormous so the period 1910-23 could be aptly described as the "era of brick arch construction". Thereafter, locally produced steel, from Newcastle and Port Kembla, displaced the use of bricks for superstructures, but large quantities of bricks continued to be used for piers, abutments and wings walls.

In the duplication programme, that of the Main South was the largest. It had been duplicated to Picton by 1892, then from 1913 to 1922 duplication was extended to Cootamundra, a distance of 343 km (213 miles), in sections but not always sequentially. For example, the 52 km first section from Picton to Bowral was one of the last completed in 1919 whereas the 89 km section, Bowral to Goulburn, had been completed in 1915.

The section of the Main South from Moss Vale to Goulburn has some of the largest brick arch viaducts, all associated with the Wollondilly River and its tributaries. Four of these have the brick piers of their 1869 bridges on their Up (north) sides.

The Goulburn Viaduct was built in 1915.

== Description ==
The Goulburn Viaduct is a large brick arch viaduct consisting of 13 x 13.1 m (43 feet) spans over the Mulwaree River in Goulburn. It is the longest viaduct on the Main South line. It is accessible from Mulwaree Street.

The abandoned skew brick piers of the 1869 single track railway are on the Up (north) side of the brick viaduct.

The bridge retains its original fabric and structure. It is in good physical condition.

== Heritage listing ==
The bridge has significance because it is part of the major duplication of the Main South Railway, the use of brick construction complements the natural environment, the duplication work contributed significantly to the continued development of South Western New South Wales, commercially through freight trains and socially through faster, better passenger trains and in the "era of brick arch construction", 1910–23, there were around 90 railway sites where brick arches singly and in multiples, for clear spans from 6.1 m (20 feet) to 13.1 m (43 feet) were built. This viaduct is the longest on the Main South with 13 x 13.1 m (43 feet) clear span brick arches. The bridge retains its original fabric and structure. On the Up (north) side there are the skw brick piers of the 1869 bridge for the original single track to Goulburn, built during the era of John Whitton, Chief Engineer of Railways in New South Wales.

Goulburn Viaduct was listed on the New South Wales State Heritage Register on 2 April 1999 having satisfied the following criteria.

The place is important in demonstrating the course, or pattern, of cultural or natural history in New South Wales.

The bridge is part of the major duplication of the Main South Railway, particularly the section from Moss Vale to Goulburn. From the first crossing of the Wollondilly River to the Mulwaree River at Goulburn, the duplication is next to the original 1869 single line. At both crossings of the Wollondilly River and at Boxers Creek and the Mulwaree River, the brick piers of the original bridges are still in place.

The place has a strong or special association with a person, or group of persons, of importance of cultural or natural history of New South Wales's history.

The bridge is readily accessible from Mulwaree Street, Goulburn and is set in a natural environment.

The place is important in demonstrating aesthetic characteristics and/or a high degree of creative or technical achievement in New South Wales.

The duplication work contributed significantly to the continued development of South Western New South Wales, commercially through freight trains and socially through faster, better passenger trains.

The place has potential to yield information that will contribute to an understanding of the cultural or natural history of New South Wales.

In the "era of brick arch construction", 1910–23, there were around 90 railway sites where brick arches singly and in multiples, for clear spans from 6.1 m (20 feet) to 13.1 m (43 feet) were built. This viaduct is the longest on the Main South Railway with 13 brick arches of 13.1 m (43 feet) clear spans.

The place is important in demonstrating the principal characteristics of a class of cultural or natural places/environments in New South Wales.

The construction of this involved brick arch construction.

== See also ==
- List of railway bridges in New South Wales
