= Old Police Barracks, Goulburn =

Old Police Barracks
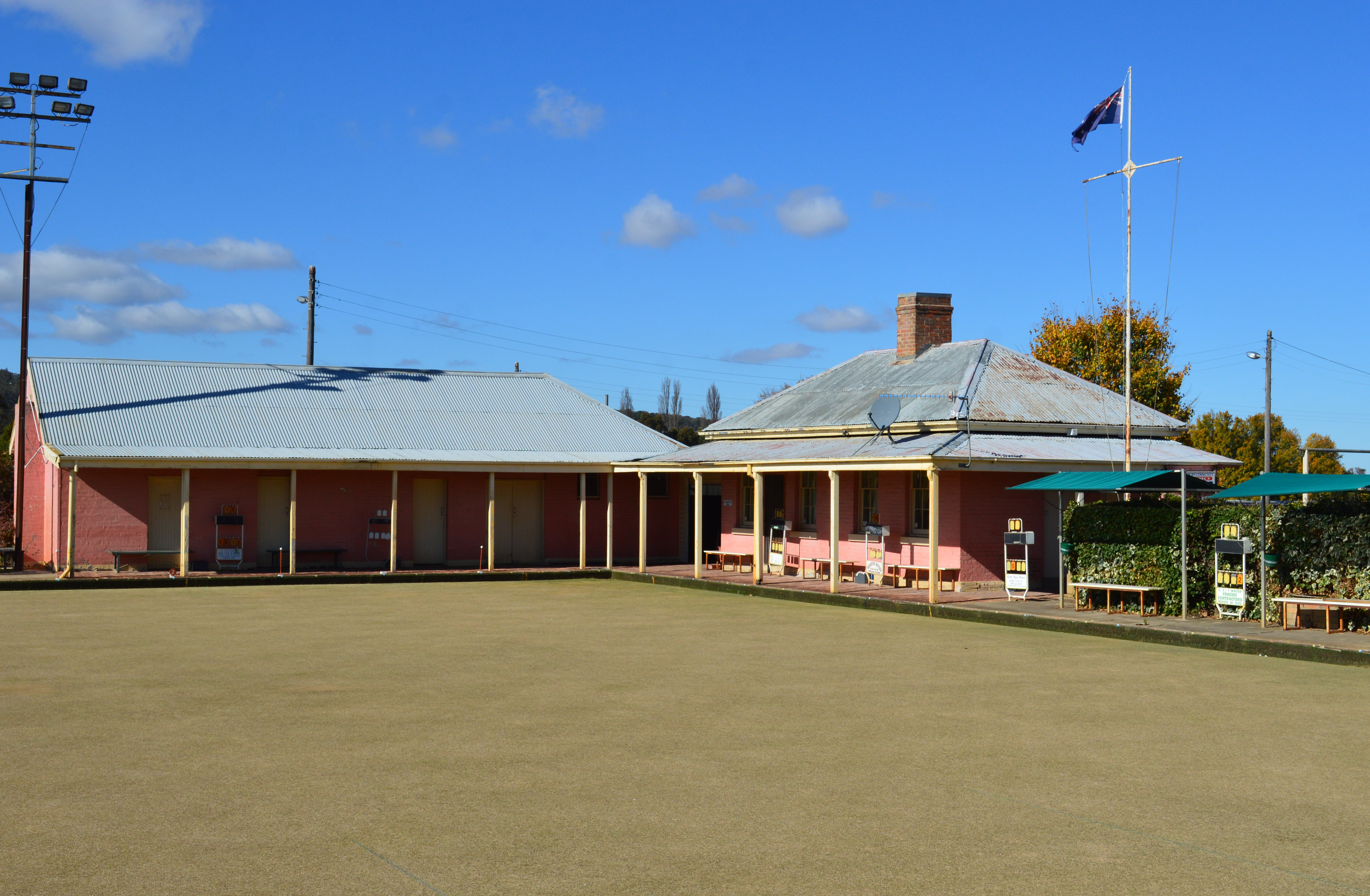
- Former police barracks, now Railway Bowling Club, 2013

- Location within New South Wales Location within Australia
- 34.7541°S 149.7225°E
- Location: Sloane Street, Goulburn, Goulburn Mulwaree Council, New South Wales, Australia

Site notes
- Owner: Goulburn Railway Bowling Club Co-op

New South Wales Heritage Register
- Official name: Old Police Barracks
- Type: state heritage (built)
- Designated: 2 April 1999
- Reference no.: 546
- Type: Barracks & housing
- Category: Law Enforcement

Old Police Barracks is a heritage-listed former police barracks and now clubhouse at 283 Sloane Street, Goulburn, Goulburn Mulwaree Council, New South Wales, Australia. It was added to the New South Wales State Heritage Register on 2 April 1999.

== History ==
The former barracks was built in 1874. It is now adaptively reused as part of the Railway Bowling Club.

== Significance ==
The Goulburn Police Barracks, erected in 1874 to cater for the needs of the increasing police force in the district, are of high local significance. The single storey barracks building is now adaptively reused as part of the Railway Bowling Club. Its heritage value lies in its early association with the provision of law enforcement services in Goulburn.

== Heritage listing ==
The Old Police Barracks was listed on the New South Wales State Heritage Register on 2 April 1999.
