= Connollys Mill =

Conolly's Mill
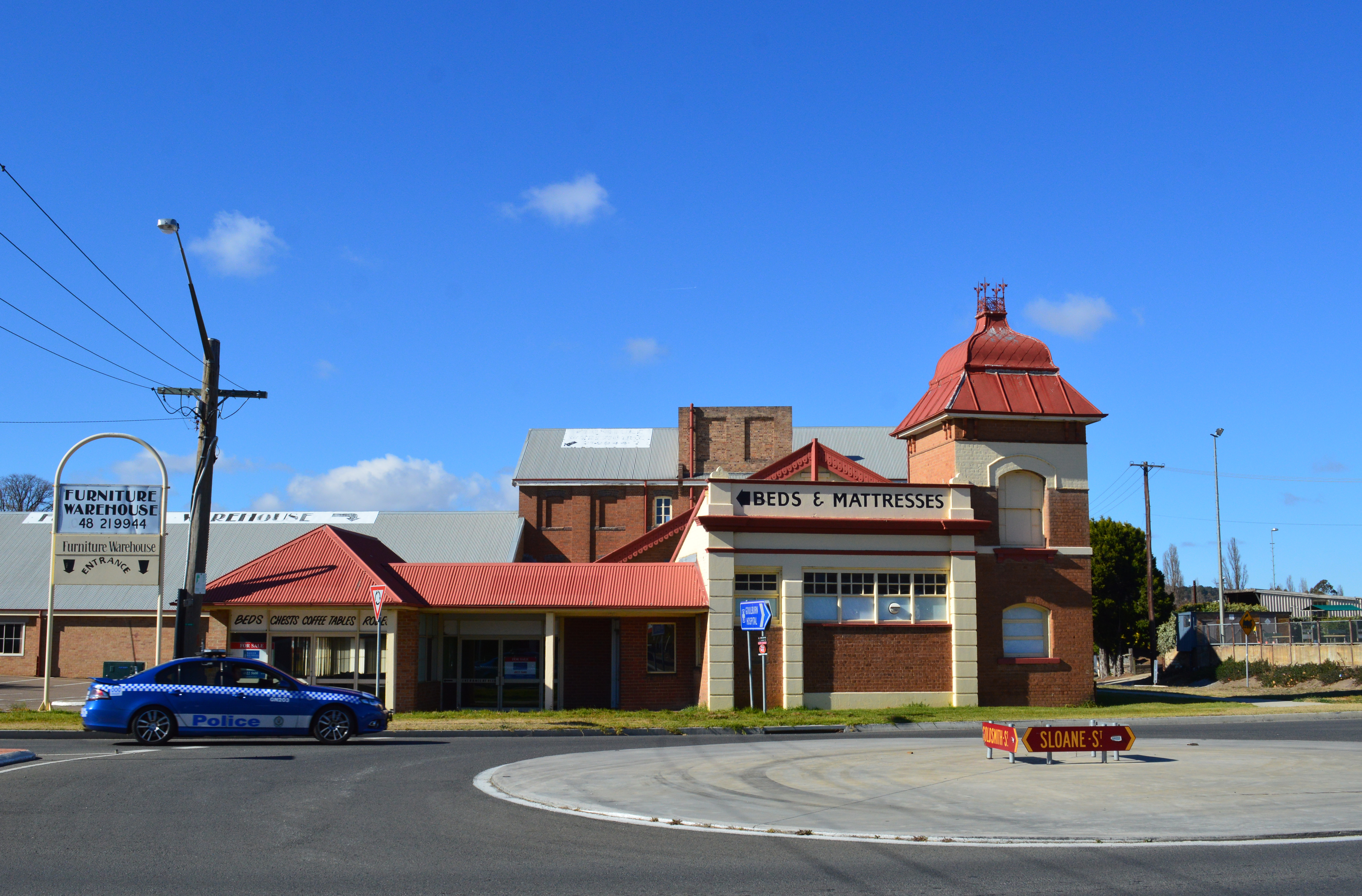
- Former flour mill, 2013

- Location within New South Wales Location within Australia
- 34.7527°S 149.7240°E
- Location: Sloane Street, Goulburn, Goulburn Mulwaree Council, New South Wales, Australia

Site notes
- Owner: Astari Pty Ltd

New South Wales Heritage Register
- Official name: Conolly's Mill
- Type: state heritage (built)
- Designated: 2 April 1999
- Reference no.: 215
- Type: Mill (Grain) – Wheat
- Category: Manufacturing and Processing

Conolly's Mill is a heritage-listed former public baths, wheat mill and now shops at Sloane Street, Goulburn, New South Wales, in the Southern Tablelands region of the state. It was added to the New South Wales State Heritage Register on 2 April 1999.

== History ==
The building was originally built by the Municipality of Goulburn as the Goulburn Public Baths or Corporation Baths in 1892. It was designed by E. C. Manfred after the council elected not to proceed with the plans of original architects McKinnon and Weitzell. It was built in brick by contractors Wilkie Brothers, who had submitted a tender of £1,497 for the work. It featured a 12 sq ft tower at the corner of Sloane and Goldsmith Streets, giving access from Goldsmith Street to the 102 ft by 45 ft baths building and containing a smoking room. The baths basin was 80 ft by 25 ft and ranged from 2 to 7 ft deep. It also contained 43 dressing boxes, shower-baths, a narrow elevated public gallery and a shop facing to Sloane Street. It was leased to Messrs. Shurmer and Day to manage and formally opened in November 1892. However, it met criticism at opening with claims that the basin was too small and not deep enough for diving. The mayor, E. Howard, acknowledged concerns about divers hitting their heads but stated that he "thought a person would have to be very drunk before he would do such a thing". The baths were open from 5am to 10pm, with two days to be set aside for ladies.

The baths continually ran at a loss for the council at an average of £160 each year, and in 1906 they were approached by William Connolly Ltd., owner of the Argyle Flour Mills, who wished to use the site as a mill. In October 1906, the council voted by a one-vote majority to sell the site for £1,000 and build cheaper premises elsewhere, leading one councillor to resign in protest. The Argyle Flour Mills had previously operated out of a site in Clifton Street.

The converted flour mill opened in 1908, the renovations having been designed by Sydney architect John Dunkley. It consisted of offices along the Sloane Street frontage with a 102 ft by 45 ft store where the baths had been, a platform above the store for packing operations and a verandah with a loading dock, connected with a new 11,200 sq ft warehouse shed capable of holding 40,000 sacks of wheat. The shed had its own railway platform as part of a private siding, the old baths building having fronted on to the railway line. The new mill building, adjoining the shed, was a brick and cement building four storeys high, 73 ft by 31 ft, alongside a 28 ft by 20 ft engine room separated from the mill by a passage.

The mill closed in the early 1970s. It subsequently operated as a leisure centre and as various retail businesses. It most recently operated as the Goulburn Furniture Warehouse. It has been raised as a potential location for a Goulburn Museum, but this has not occurred. The former swimming baths still remain in place under the floorboards of the former mill store.

== Heritage listing ==
Connollys Mill was listed on the New South Wales State Heritage Register on 2 April 1999.
