= Goulburn =

- City
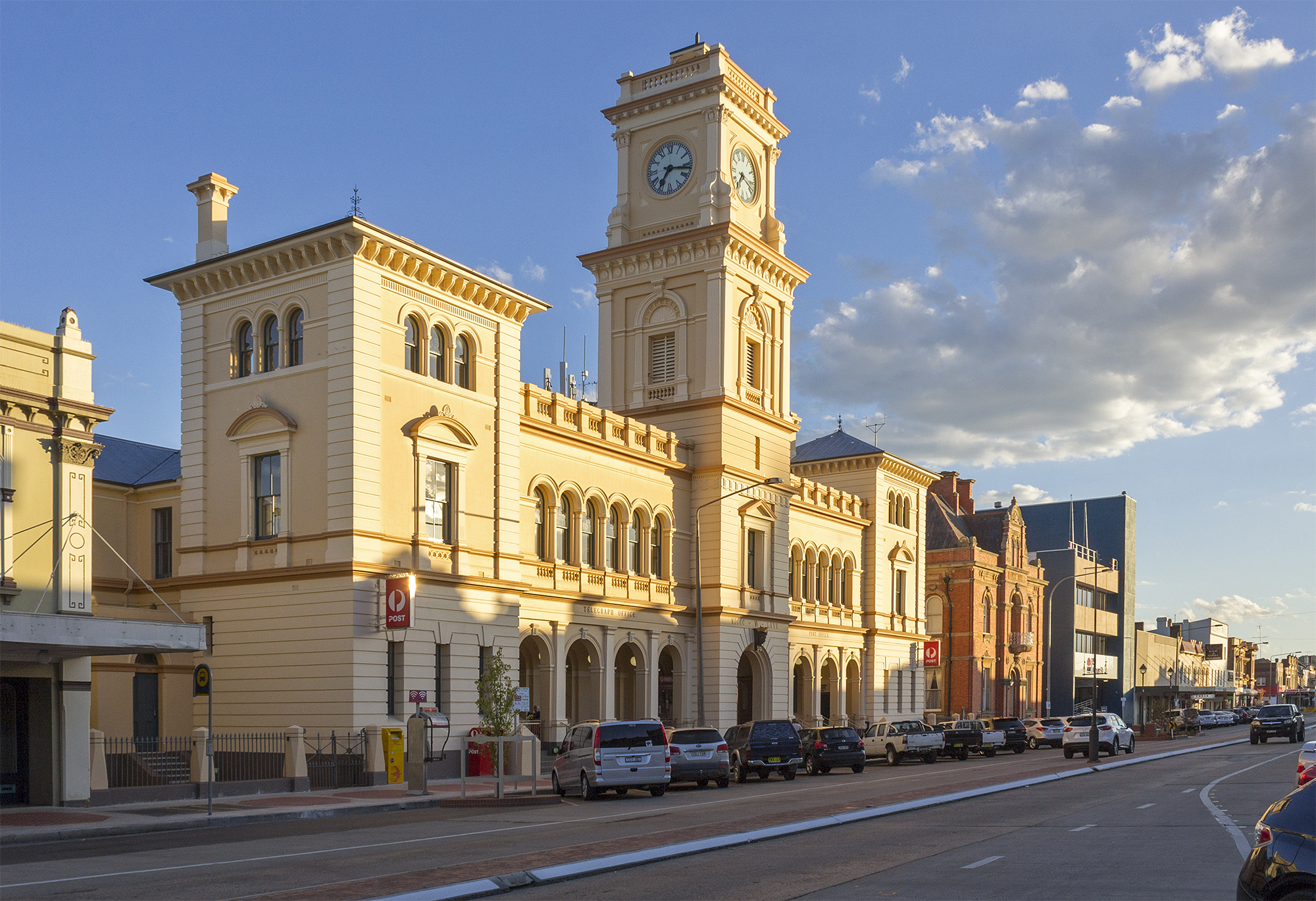
- Goulburn Post Office on Auburn Street c. 2016

- Coordinates: 34°45′21″S 149°43′14″E
- Country: Australia
- State: New South Wales
- LGA: Goulburn Mulwaree Council
- Location: 195 km (121 mi) SW of Sydney; 90 km (56 mi) NE of Canberra; 83 km (52 mi) E of Yass; 71 km (44 mi) SW of Moss Vale; 128 km (80 mi) W of Kiama
- Established: 1833

Government
  - State electorate: Goulburn
  - Federal division: Eden-Monaro
- Elevation: 642 m (2,106 ft)

Population
  - Total: 24,565 (SUA 2021)
- Postcode: 2580
- County: Argyle
- Parish: Goulburn
- Mean max temp: 19.8 °C (67.6 °F)
- Mean min temp: 6.1 °C (43.0 °F)
- Annual rainfall: 575.2 mm (22.65 in)
Localities around Goulburn
Kingsdale	Middle Arm	Tarlo
Baw Baw	Goulburn	Towrang
Run-O-Waters	Brisbane Grove	Boxers Creek

Goulburn (/ɡoʊlbərn/ GOHL-bərn) is a regional city in the Southern Tablelands of New South Wales, Australia, approximately 195 kilometres (121 mi) south-west of Sydney and 90 kilometres (56 mi) north-east of Canberra. It was the first inland settlement in Australia to be proclaimed a city, through letters patent by Queen Victoria in 1863 (although Bathurst, established in 1815, is the oldest inland settlement in Australia). Goulburn had a population of 24,565 as of the 2021 census. Goulburn is the seat of Goulburn Mulwaree Council.

Goulburn is a railhead on the Main Southern line, and regional health and government services centre, supporting the surrounding pastoral industry as well as being a stopover for travellers on the Hume Highway. It has a central historic park and many historic and listed buildings. It is also home to the monument the Big Merino, a sculpture that is the world's largest concrete sheep.

== History ==
The Goulburn Plains were named by surveyor James Meehan after Henry Goulburn, Under-Secretary for War and the Colonies, during an excursion by Governor Lachlan Macquarie to the area in 1820. The Aboriginal name for the area is Mulwaree which means "long water".

The colonial British government gave large land grants to well-connected colonists such as Captain Lachlan Macalister, William Broughton and Hannibal Macarthur in the Goulburn area from about 1820. Smaller parcels of land were later sold to ordinary settlers within the Nineteen Counties, including Argyle County in which Goulburn was located. The process displaced the local Indigenous Mulwaree clan and the introduction of exotic livestock drove out a large part of the Aboriginal peoples' food supply.

=== Indigenous history ===
The Mulwaree Plains are the traditional lands of the Mulwaree and Tarlo clans of the Gandangara people. These people were closely inter-related with the Burra Burra clan of Gandangara from the Taralga area and also the Gandangara clans residing north along the Wollondilly River.

It has been proposed that the Mulwaree were perhaps from the neighbouring Ngunnawal language group of people. However, early accounts show that the Ngunnawal would often come to the Goulburn region to fight with the Mulwaree clan of Gandangara before returning to their homelands around Yass and the upper reaches of the Lachlan River.

=== British colonisation ===
One of the most influential first recorded colonists in the Goulburn area was Captain Lachlan Macalister who established the 'Strathaird' grazing property in 1825 (on the site of the present Police Academy) and was appointed magistrate of the region. The first buildings in Goulburn were a rough-hewn timber jail and courthouse with a simple barracks for troopers of the New South Wales Mounted Police. Under Macalister, the convict labourers of the early colonists were treated brutally with public floggings being frequently administered.

The town of Goulburn was originally surveyed in 1828, although moved to the present site of the city in 1833 when the surveyor Robert Hoddle laid it out.

Around 1833, Mat Healy established the first pub and built the first stone building. George Johnson purchased a town allotment between 1839 and 1842 and became a central figure in the town's development. He established a branch store with a liquor licence in 1848. The 1841 census records Goulburn had a population of 655 people: 444 males and 211 females. This number had jumped to 1,171 inhabitants by 1847, 686 males and 485 females. It had a courthouse, police barracks, churches, hospital and post office and was the centre of a great sheep and farming area.

A telegraph station opened in 1862, by which time there were about 1,500 residents, a blacksmith's shop, two hotels, two stores, the telegraph office and a few cottages. The town was a change station (where coach horses were changed) for Cobb & Co by 1855. A police station opened the following year and a school in 1858. Goulburn was proclaimed a municipal government in 1859 and was made a city in 1863. The Goulburn Football Club was established in 1872 and the following year took part in the earliest known rugby union match outside of Sydney when they played the Garroorigang School (a boarding and day school for boys located in Goulburn).

The arrival of the railway in 1869, which was opened on 27 May by the Governor Lord Belmore (an event commemorated by Belmore Park in the centre of the city), along with the completion of the line from Sydney to Albury in 1883, was a boon to the city. Later branchlines were constructed to Cooma (opened in 1889) and later extended further to Nimmitabel and then to Bombala, and to Crookwell and Taralga. Goulburn became a major railway centre with a roundhouse and engine servicing facilities and a factory which made pre-fabricated concrete components for signal boxes and station buildings. The roundhouse is now the Goulburn Rail Heritage Centre with steam, diesel and rolling stock exhibits. Rail First Asset Management (previously known as CFCL Australia) operate the Goulburn Railway Workshops.

St Saviour's Cathedral, designed by Edmund Thomas Blacket, was completed in 1884 with the tower being added in 1988 to commemorate the Bicentenary of Australia. Though completed in 1884, some earlier burials are in the graveyard adjacent to the cathedral. St Saviour's is the seat of the Bishop of Canberra and Goulburn. The Church of SS Peter and Paul is the former cathedral for the Roman Catholic Archdiocese of Canberra and Goulburn.

The Goulburn Viaduct was built in 1915 replacing an earlier structure. This brick arch railway viaduct spanning the Mulwaree Ponds is the longest on the Main Southern railway line and consists of 13 arches each spanning 13.1 m (43 ft).

=== Proclaimed a city ===
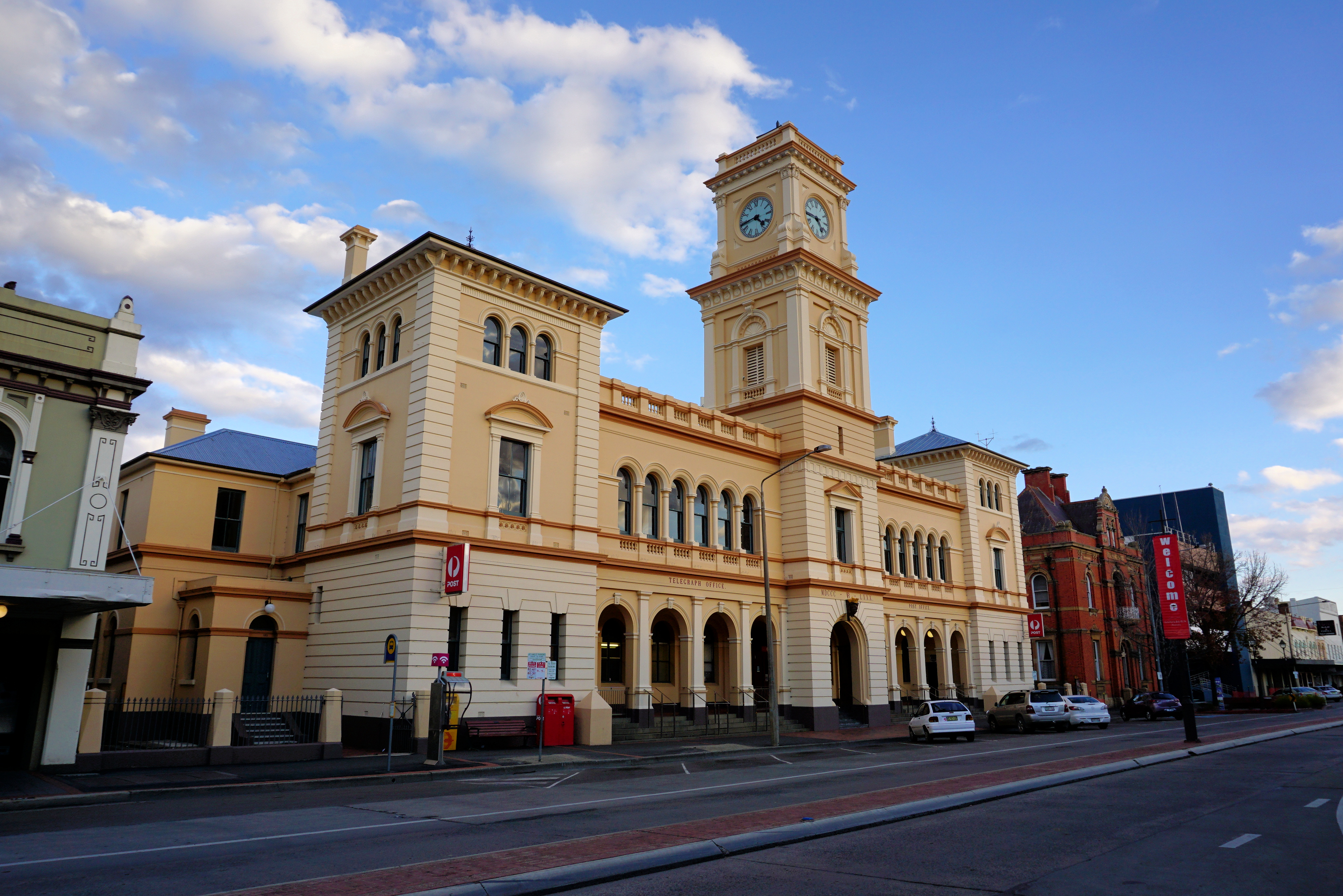
Goulburn Post Office

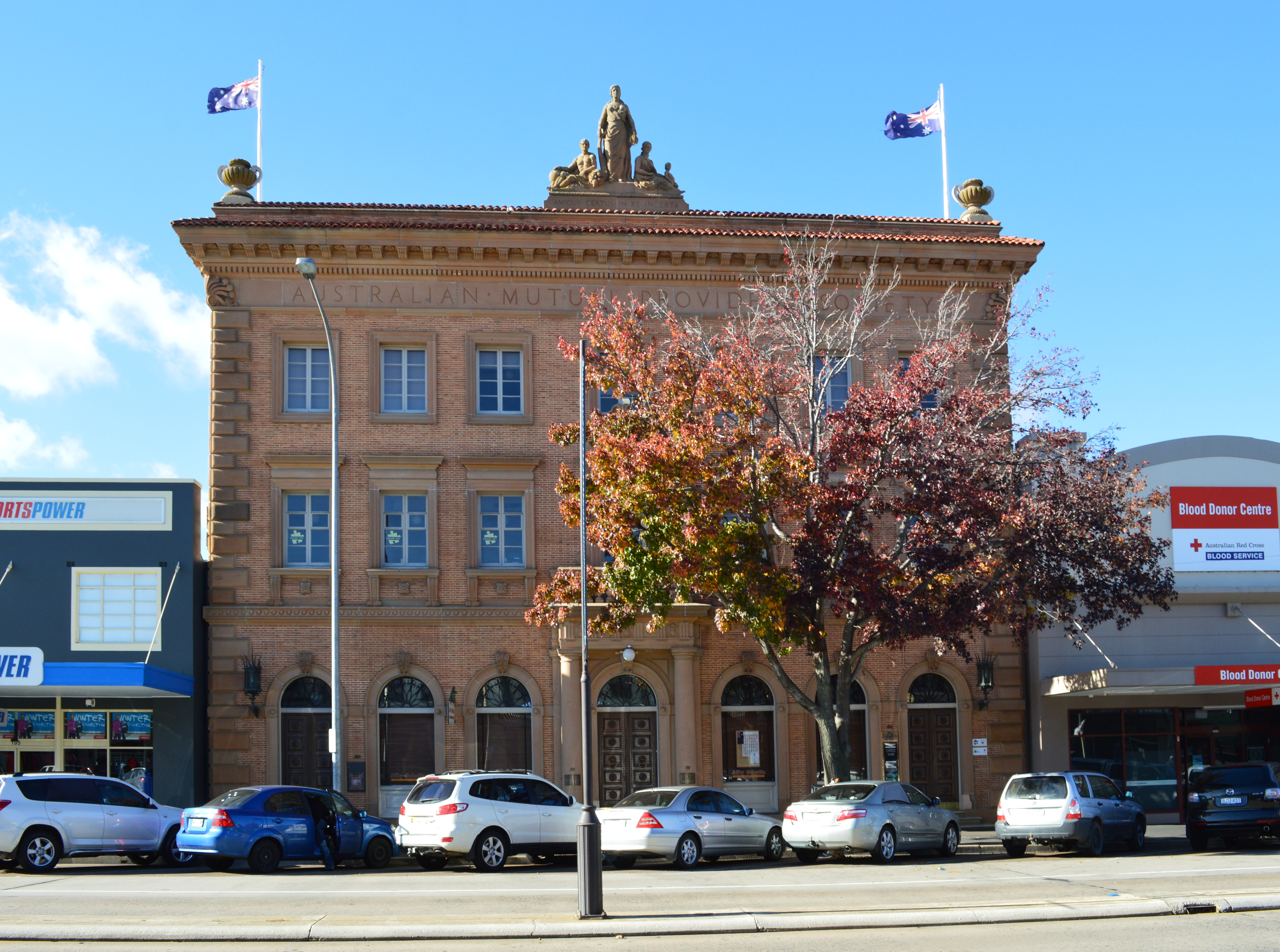
The former Australian Mutual Provident Society building, one of many commercial and public buildings constructed during the 19th century

Goulburn holds the distinction of being proclaimed a City on two occasions. The first, unofficial, proclamation was claimed by virtue of Royal Letters Patent issued by Queen Victoria on 14 March 1863 to establish the Diocese of Goulburn. It was a claim made for ecclesiastical purposes, as it was required by the traditions of the Church of England. The Letters Patent also established St Saviour's Church as the Cathedral Church of the diocese. This was the last instance in which Letters Patent were used in this manner in the British Empire, as they had been significantly discredited for use in the colonies, and were soon to be declared formally invalid and unenforceable in this context. Several legal cases over the preceding decade in particular had already established that the monarch had no ecclesiastical jurisdiction in colonies possessing responsible government. This had been granted to NSW in 1856, seven years earlier. The Letters Patent held authority only over those who submitted to it voluntarily, and then only within the context of the Church—it had no legal civil authority or implications. An absolute and retrospective declaration to this effect was made in 1865 in the Colenso Case, by the Judiciary Committee of the Privy Council.

However, under the authority of the Crown Lands Act 1884 (48. Vict. No. 18), Goulburn was officially proclaimed a City on 20 March 1885 removing any lingering doubts as to its status. This often unrecognised controversy has in no way hindered the development of Goulburn as a regional centre, with an impressive court house (completed in 1887) and other public buildings, as a centre for wool selling, and as an industrial town.

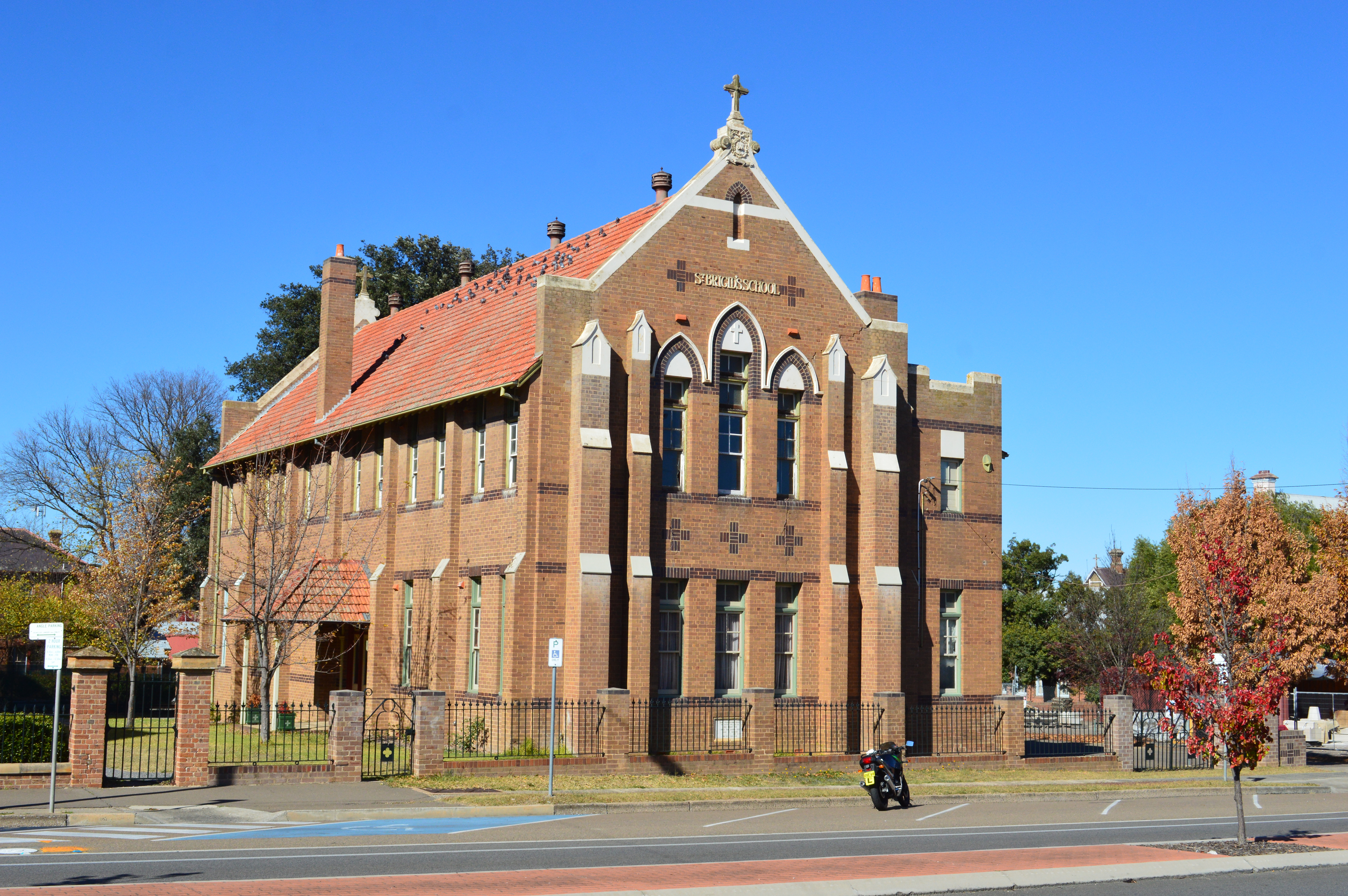
St Brigid's School, Goulburn, now closed; the scene of an education strike in 1962

=== Goulburn School Strike ===
In 1962, Goulburn was the focus of the fight for state aid to non-government schools. An education strike was called in response to a demand for installation of three extra toilets at a local Catholic primary school, St Brigid's. The local Catholic archdiocese closed down all local Catholic primary schools and sent the children to the government schools. The Catholic authorities declared that they had no money to install the extra toilets. Nearly 1,000 children turned up to be enrolled locally and the state schools were unable to accommodate them. The strike lasted only a week but generated national debate. In 1963 the prime minister, Robert Menzies, made state aid for science blocks part of his party's platform.

== Heritage listings ==
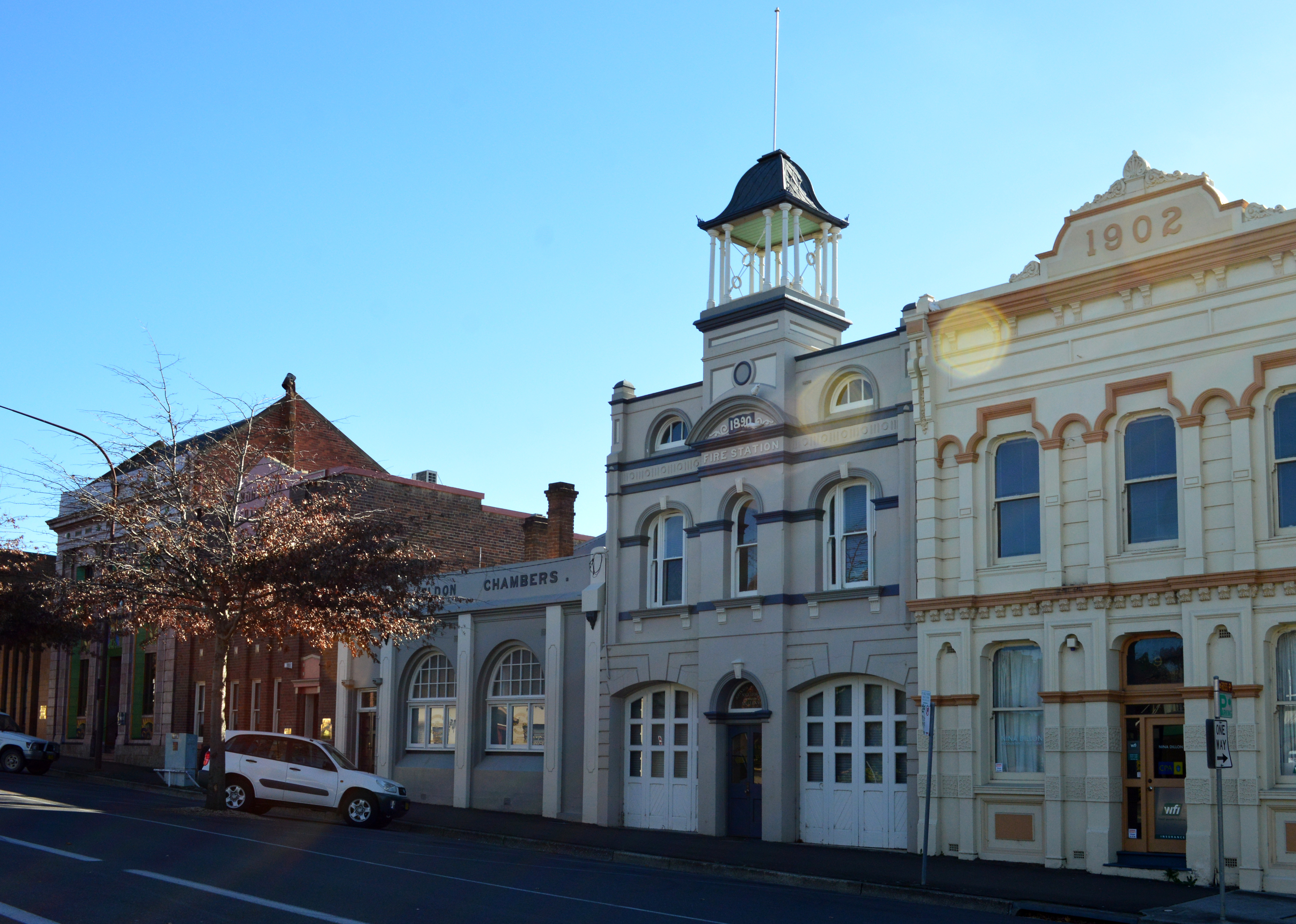
Historic buildings lining Montague Street, including the heritage listed Old Fire Station

Goulburn has a number of heritage-listed sites, including:

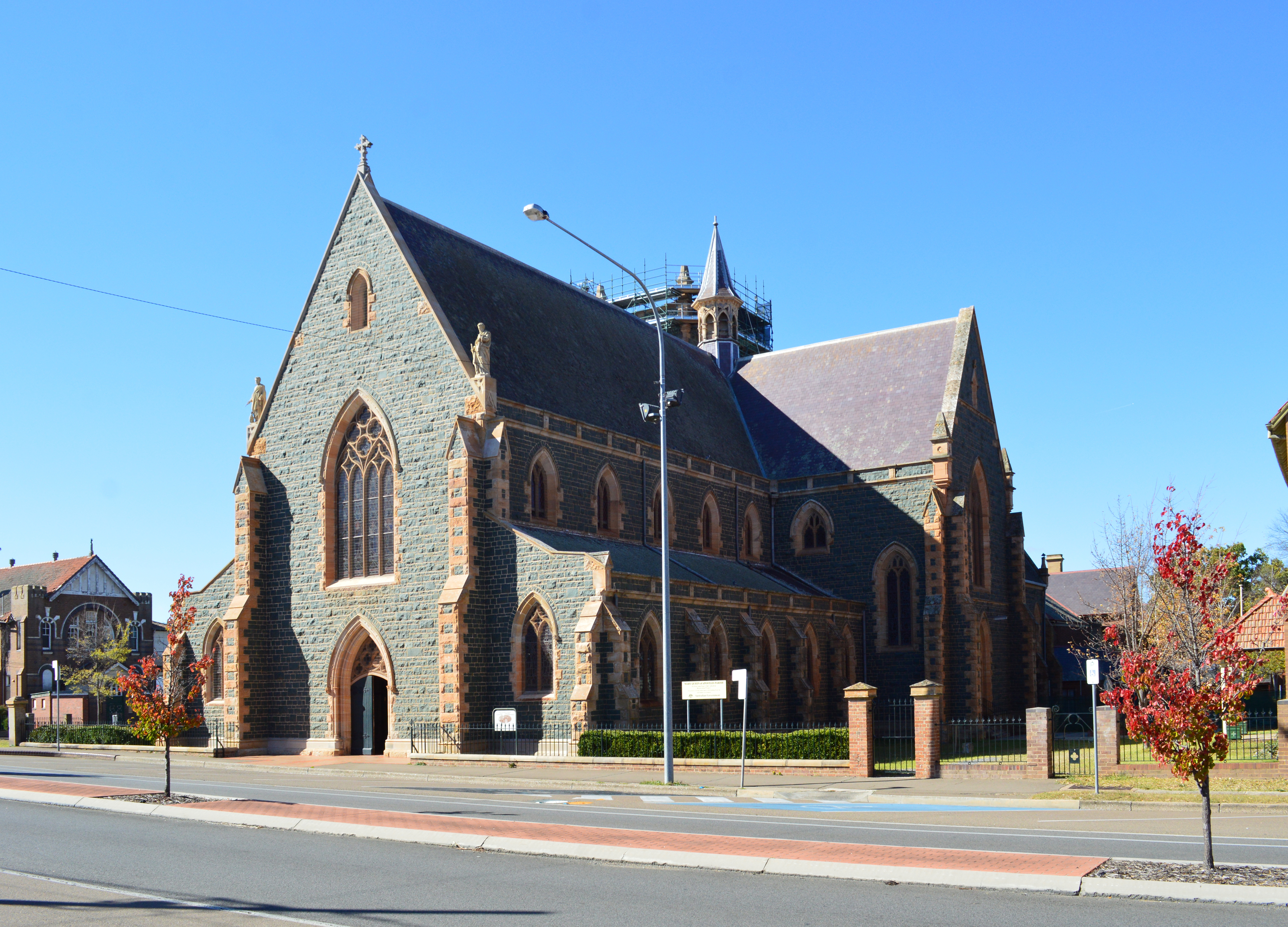
St Peter and Paul's Old Cathedral

- 165 Auburn Street: Goulburn Post Office
- 170 Bourke Street: St Saviour's Cathedral, Goulburn
- 197 Braidwood Road: Railway Barracks
- Bungonia Road: Old Goulburn Brewery
- Bungonia Road: Lansdowne Park
- Clifford Street: Colonial Mutual Life Building
- 248 Main Road: Rossi Bridge over Wollondilly River
- Main Southern railway: Goulburn Viaduct
- Main Southern railway: Goulburn railway station
- off Maud Street: Goulburn Correctional Centre
- Maud Street: Riversdale
- 4 Montague Street: Goulburn Court House
- Sloane Street: Connollys Mill
- Sloane Street: Old Police Barracks, Goulburn
- Sloane Street: Goulburn Railway Workshops
- 244–248 Sloane Street: Alpine Lodge Motel
- 318 Sloane Street: St Clair
- Taralga Road: Kenmore Asylum
- 42 Verner Street: St Peter and Paul's Old Cathedral
- Wollondilly River: Goulburn Pumping Station

== Demographics ==
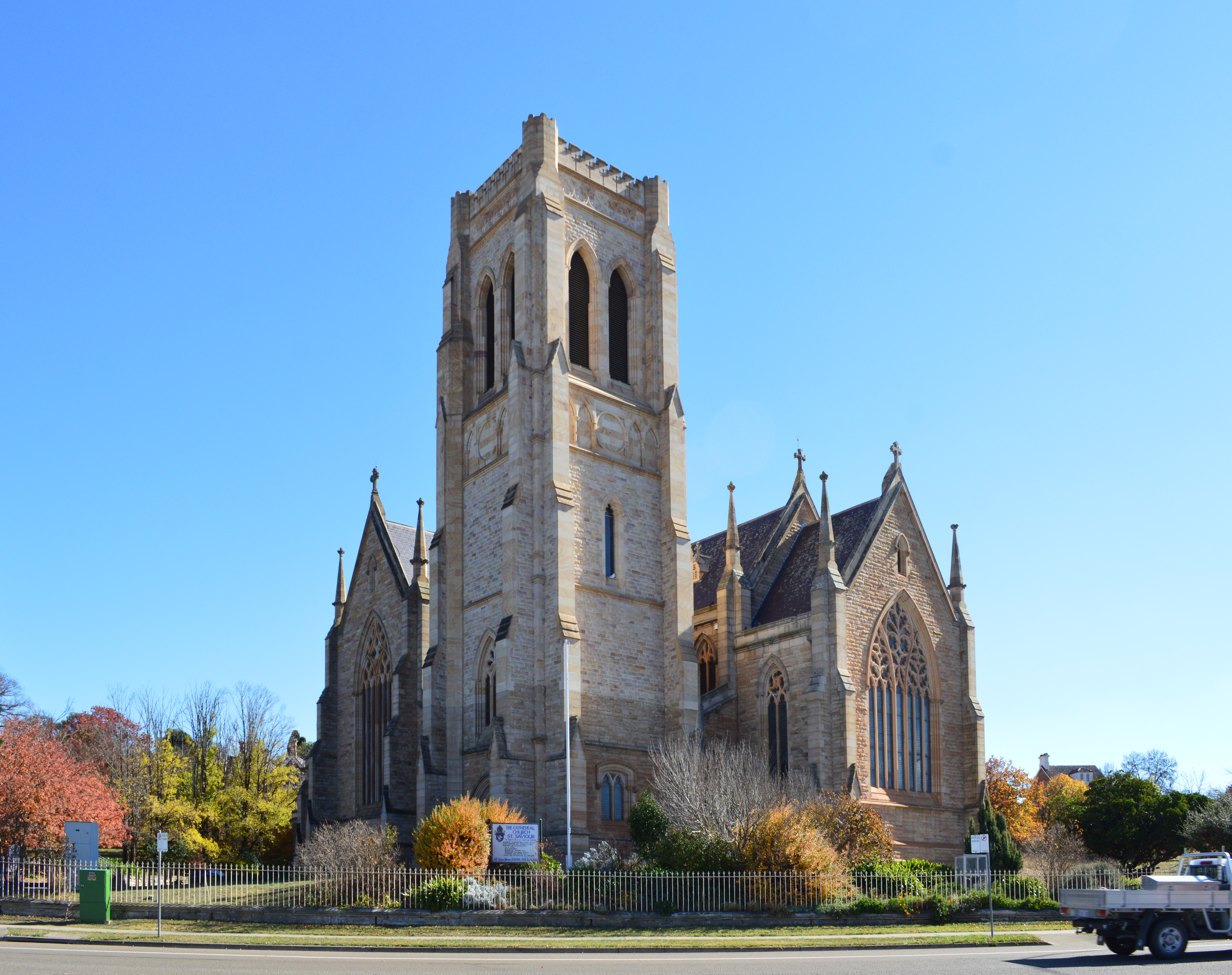
St Saviour's Anglican Cathedral

According to the 2021 census, there were 24,565 people in Goulburn. Of these:

- Aboriginal and Torres Strait Islander people made up 5.3% of the population.
- 83.3% of people were born in Australia. The next most common countries of birth included England 1.9%, New Zealand 1.0%, India 0.9% and the Philippines 0.7%, and Nepal 0.6%.
- 85.6% of people spoke only English at home, the next most common languages spoken at home included Nepali 0.7%, Mandarin 0.6%, Malayalam 0.4%, Greek 0.3%, and Punjabi 0.3%
- The most common responses for religion were No Religion 30.6%, Catholic 25.3%, Anglican 20.8%, and Uniting Church 3.0%; a further 8.5% of respondents elected not to disclose their religion.

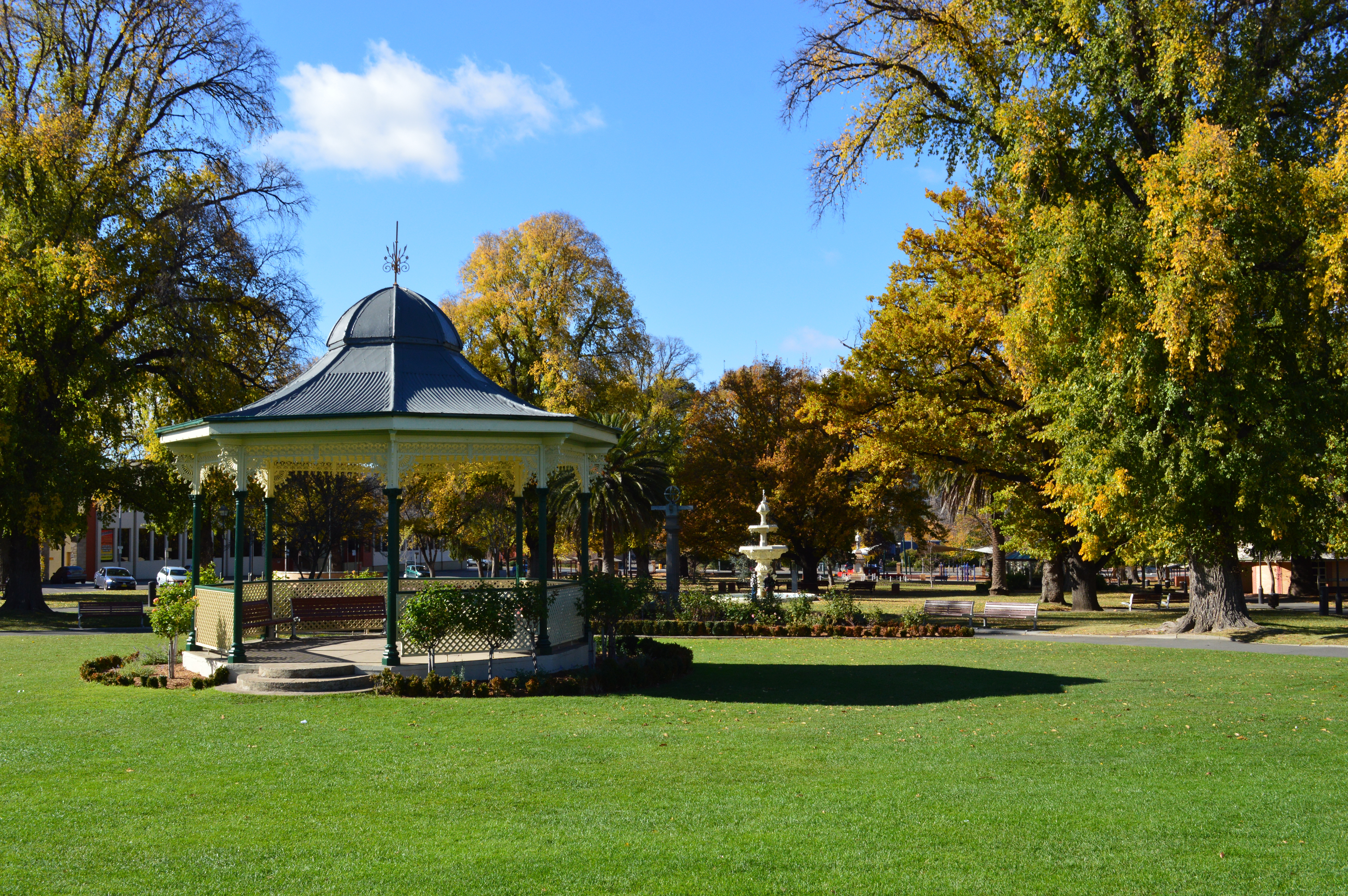
Belmore Park

== Geography ==
Goulburn is located a small distance east of the peak ridge of the Great Dividing Range and is 690 metres (2,264 ft) above sea level. It is intersected by the Wollondilly River and the Mulwaree River, and the confluence of these two rivers is also located here. The Wollondilly then flows north-east, into Lake Burragorang (Warragamba Dam) and eventually into the Tasman Sea via the Hawkesbury River. The city is located within the Southern Tablelands Temperate Grassland.

=== Climate ===
Owing to its elevation, Goulburn has an oceanic climate (Cfb) with warm summers and cool to cold winters; with a high diurnal range. Its climate is variable much of the year, though generally dry with maximum temperatures ranging from 11.8 °C (53.2 °F) in July to 28.3 °C (82.9 °F) in January. Rainfall is distributed evenly throughout the year, with an annual average of 542.8 mm (21.4 in). Snow occasionally falls, although rarely in significant quantities due to the rainshadow brought about by the hills to the west-northwest of Goulburn (around Crookwell). Temperature extremes have ranged from −10.9 to 42.8 °C (12.4 to 109.0 °F).

Climate data for Goulburn Airport AWS (1991–2024); 640 m AMSL; 34.81° S, 149.73° E
Month	Jan	Feb	Mar	Apr	May	Jun	Jul	Aug	Sep	Oct	Nov	Dec	Year
Record high °C (°F)	42.8 (109.0)	41.8 (107.2)	37.6 (99.7)	31.0 (87.8)	25.1 (77.2)	20.7 (69.3)	19.7 (67.5)	24.1 (75.4)	30.5 (86.9)	31.3 (88.3)	39.9 (103.8)	42.1 (107.8)	42.8 (109.0)
Mean daily maximum °C (°F)	28.1 (82.6)	26.4 (79.5)	23.7 (74.7)	20.0 (68.0)	15.9 (60.6)	12.4 (54.3)	11.8 (53.2)	13.4 (56.1)	16.6 (61.9)	19.9 (67.8)	23.0 (73.4)	25.9 (78.6)	19.8 (67.6)
Mean daily minimum °C (°F)	12.9 (55.2)	12.6 (54.7)	10.2 (50.4)	5.8 (42.4)	2.5 (36.5)	1.3 (34.3)	0.3 (32.5)	0.6 (33.1)	3.0 (37.4)	5.3 (41.5)	8.3 (46.9)	10.7 (51.3)	6.1 (43.0)
Record low °C (°F)	−0.1 (31.8)	0.7 (33.3)	−0.8 (30.6)	−6.3 (20.7)	−8.1 (17.4)	−10.2 (13.6)	−10.4 (13.3)	−10.9 (12.4)	−7.4 (18.7)	−5.6 (21.9)	−4.4 (24.1)	−1.2 (29.8)	−10.9 (12.4)
Average precipitation mm (inches)	54.8 (2.16)	54.9 (2.16)	49.3 (1.94)	26.8 (1.06)	34.6 (1.36)	56.4 (2.22)	32.6 (1.28)	44.3 (1.74)	44.9 (1.77)	52.4 (2.06)	61.3 (2.41)	56.4 (2.22)	575.2 (22.65)
Average precipitation days (≥ 0.2mm)	8.3	9.1	10.5	9.1	11.9	14.7	13.9	12.0	11.3	10.0	10.0	8.4	129.2
Average afternoon relative humidity (%)	41	45	46	46	54	63	61	52	50	46	45	39	49
Source: Australian Bureau of Meteorology; Goulburn Airport AWS

== Governance ==
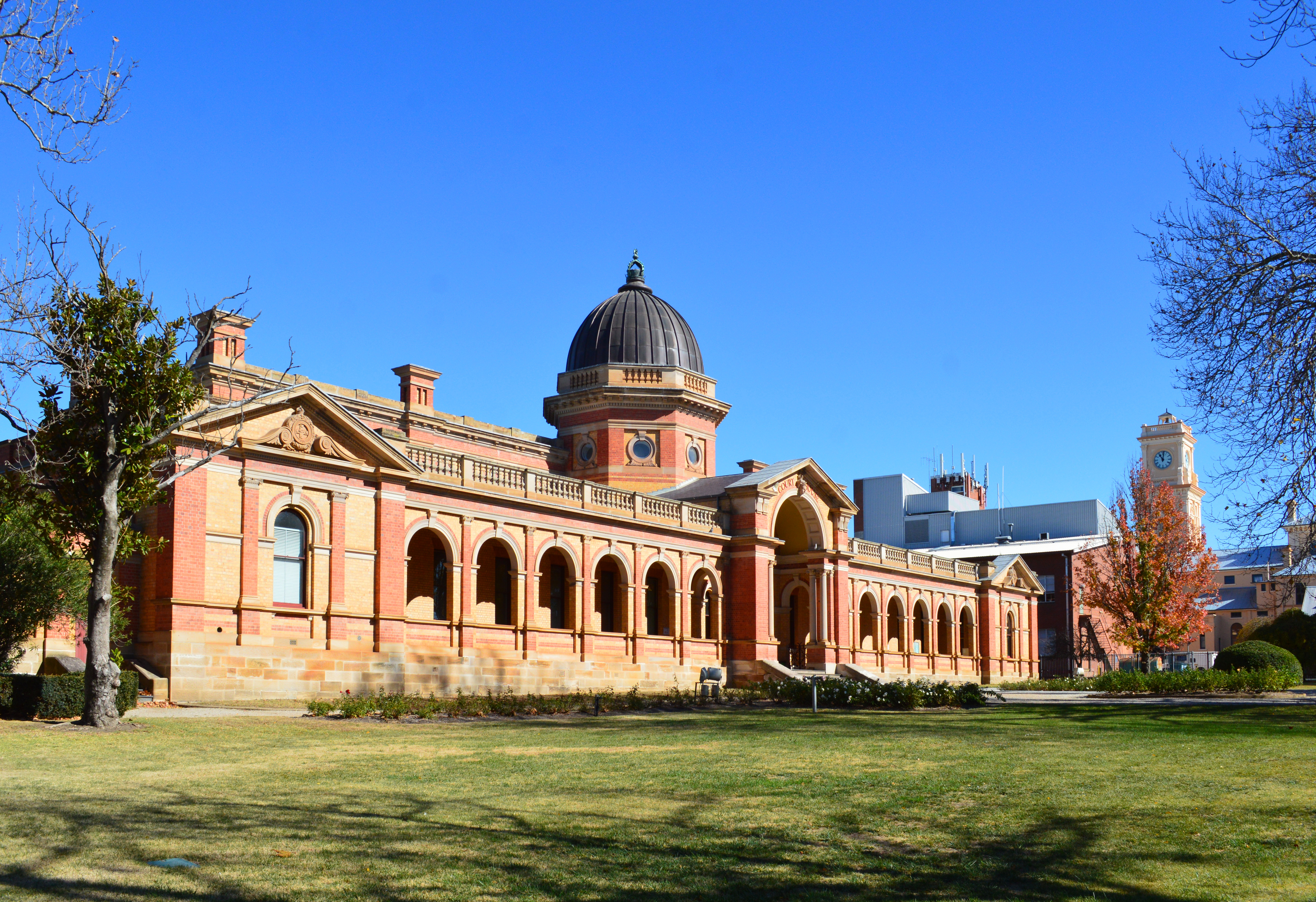
Goulburn Court House

As a major settlement of southern New South Wales, Goulburn was the administrative centre for the region and was the location for important buildings of the district. The first lock-up in the town was built in 1830. In 1832 a postal service commenced in Goulburn, four years after the service was adopted in New South Wales.

The first town plan had been drawn up by Assistant Surveyor Dixon in 1828, but the site was moved, as it was subject to flooding. The new town plan was drawn up by Surveyor Hoddle and was gazetted in 1833.

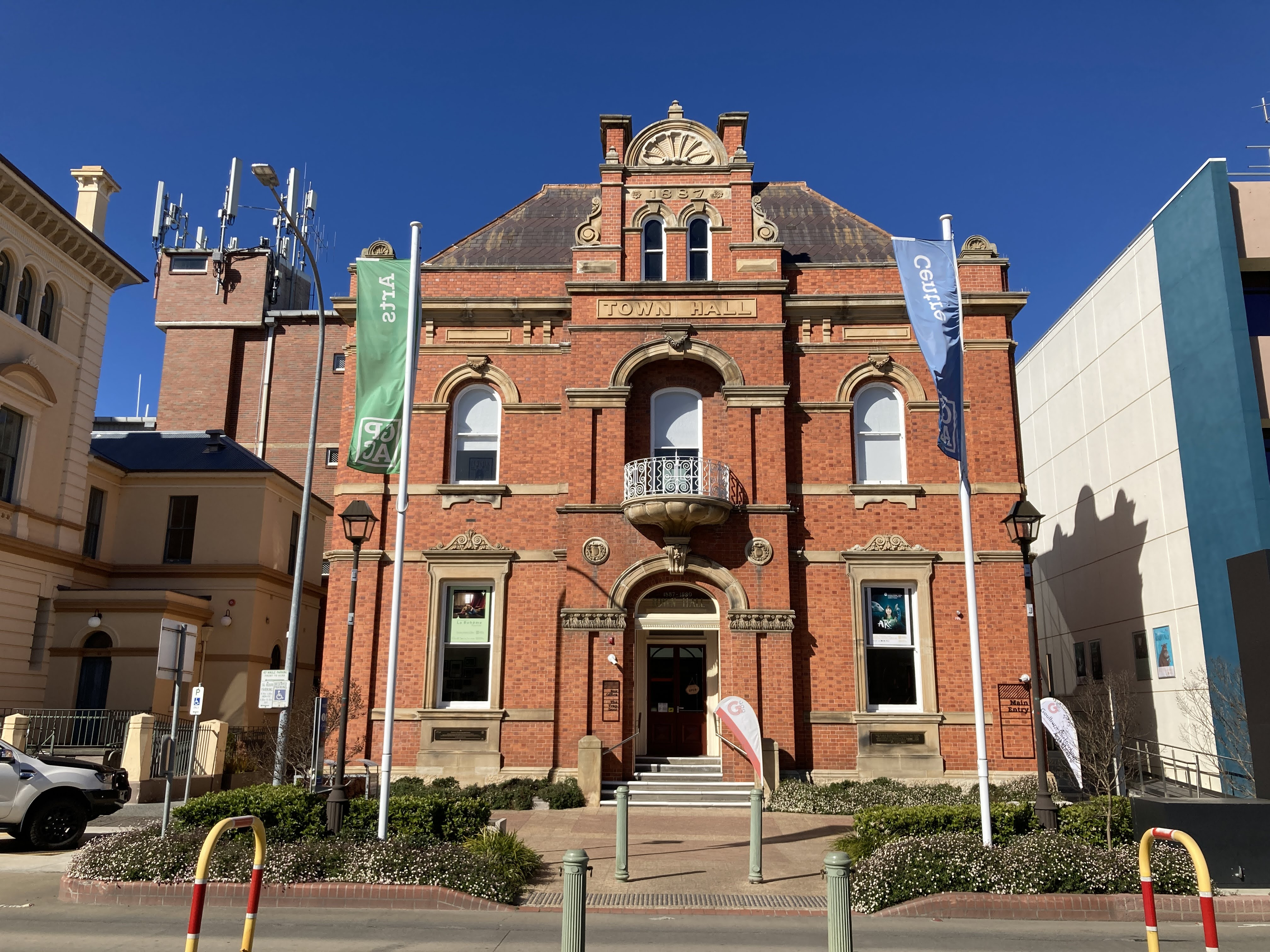
Goulburn Town Hall

Goulburn is the seat of the Goulburn Mulwaree Shire local government area (LGA) of New South Wales, Australia formed in 2004. The most recent elections for Council were held on 4 December 2021.

=== New South Wales Police Academy ===
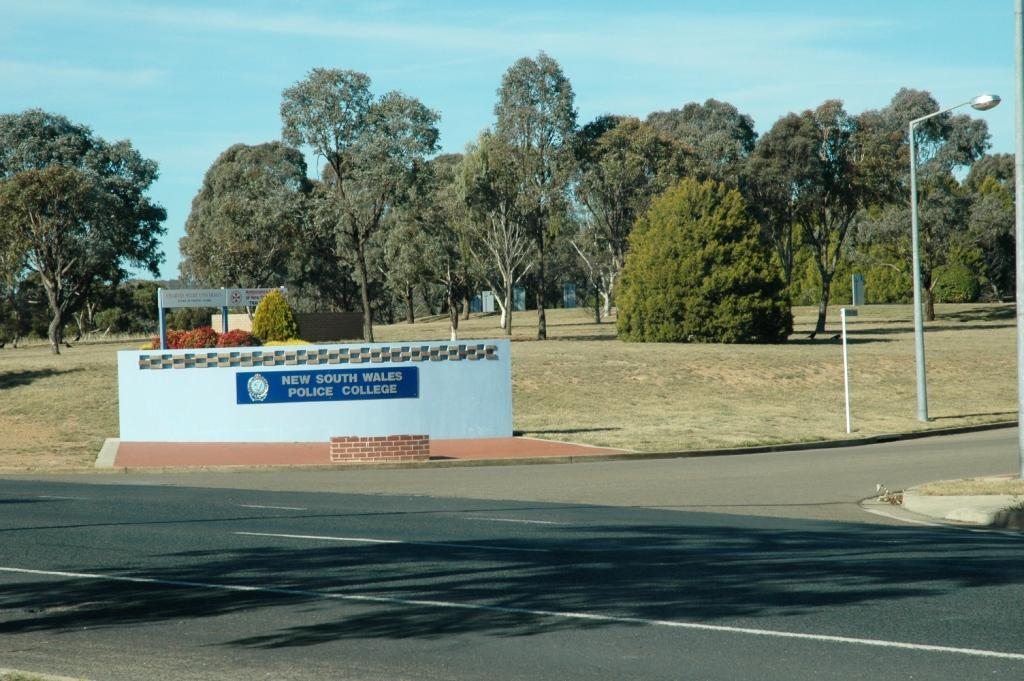
The New South Wales Police Academy is situated at McDermott Drive, Goulburn

The Police Academy relocated to Goulburn from Sydney in 1984. From 2002, it was known as the New South Wales Police College; however, the name was changed back in 2011.

The Academy has relocated to the former campus of the Goulburn College of Advanced Education located on the banks of the Wollondilly River. The New South Wales Police Academy is now the largest education institution for law enforcement officers in the southern hemisphere.

Since its relocation there has been significant expansion of the facilities including a new site on the Taralga Road which houses the New South Wales Police School of Traffic and Mobile Policing.

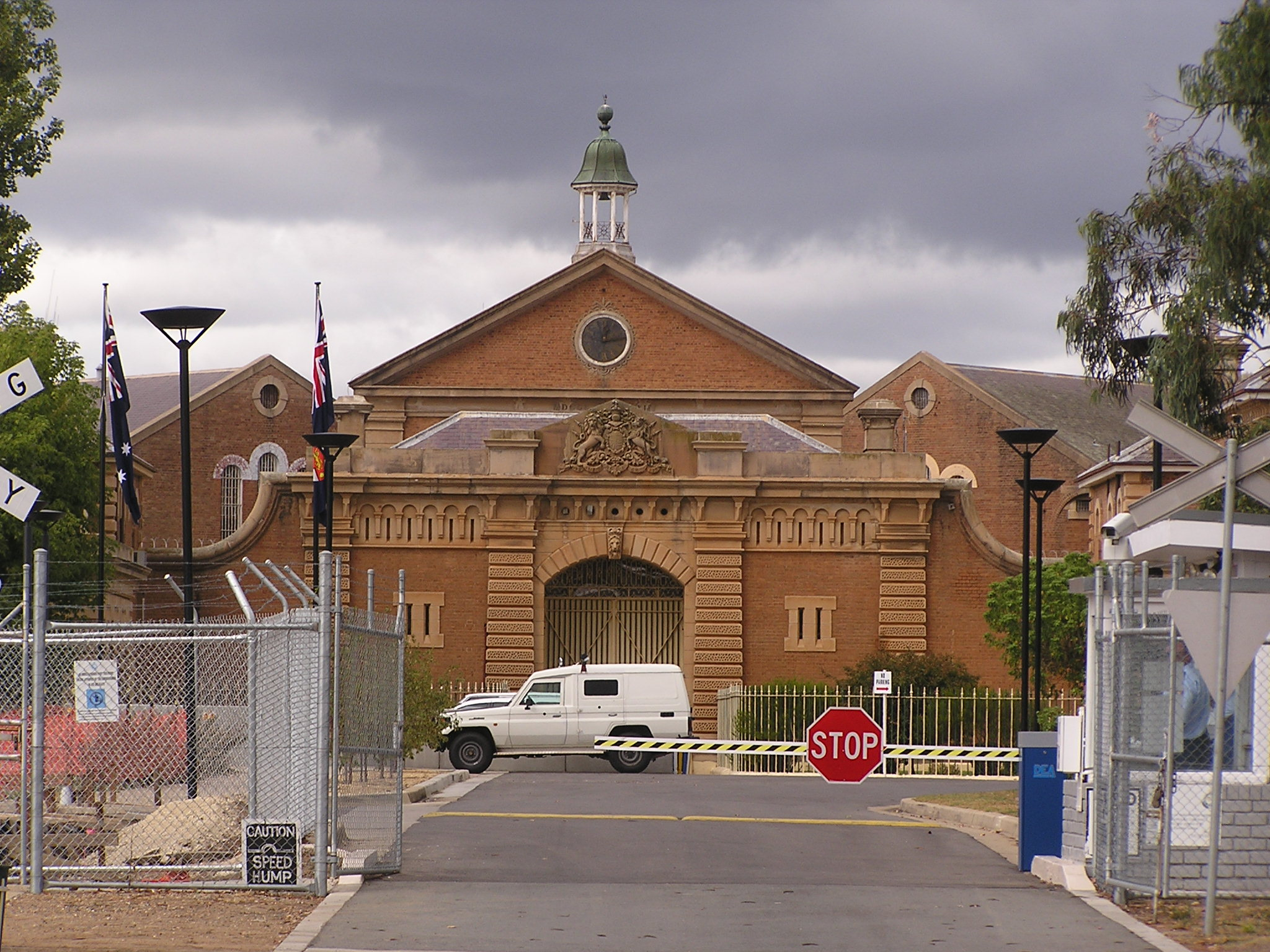
Goulburn Correctional Centre

=== Goulburn Gaol ===
Goulburn is home to Goulburn Correctional Centre, more generically known as Goulburn Gaol. It is a maximum-security male prison, the highest-security prison in Australia and is home to some of the most dangerous, and infamous, prisoners. One of these prisoners was Ivan Milat, an Australian serial killer who was convicted of the backpacker murders in 1996.

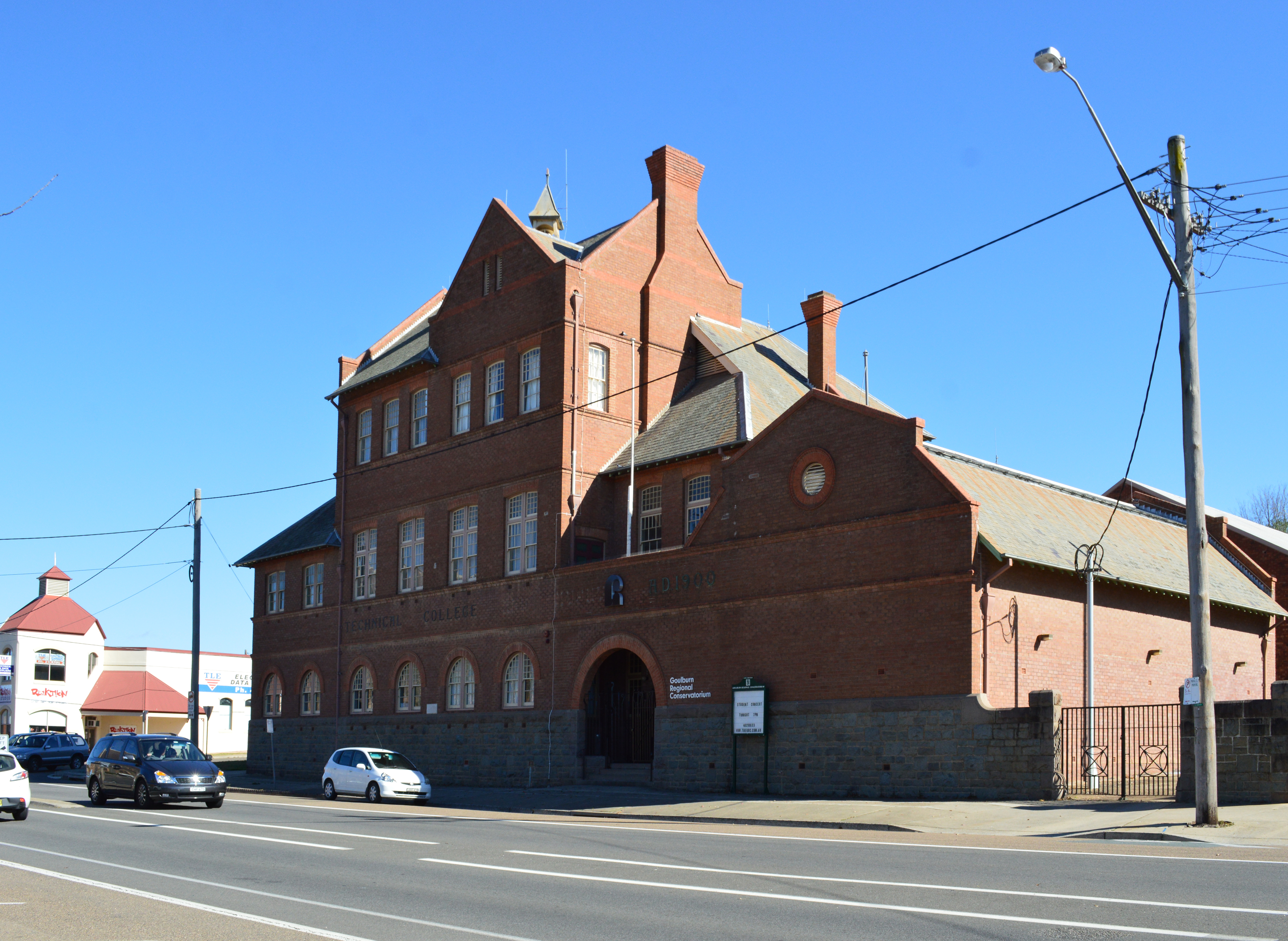
Goulburn Regional Conservatorium

== Culture ==
=== Theatre ===
Goulburn is home to Australia's oldest existing theatre company Lieder Theatre Company, established in 1891. The Lieder Theatre Company presents up to five major performance projects each year, along with numerous community events, readings, workshops, and short seasons of experimental and new work. The company, along with the Lieder Youth Theatre Company, is based in the historic Lieder Theatre, built by the company in 1929.

A former quarry adjacent to the Main Southern railway line in North Goulburn was used to film cliff top scenes in the 2016 film Hacksaw Ridge.

=== Sport ===
The most popular sport in Goulburn is rugby league. The town has a team, the Goulburn City Bulldogs, who play in the Canberra Rugby League. The club was founded in 2020, superseding the Goulburn Workers Bulldogs. Historically, there have been many clubs in Goulburn, including:

- Goulburn United Roosters (1932–1986)
- Goulburn Workers Bulldogs (1958–1984, 2008–2019)
- Goulburn City (1987)
- Goulburn Gladiators (1991–1995)
- Goulburn Stockmen (1996–2007)

The Goulburn Stockmen played in both the Canberra Rugby League and also the Group 6 Rugby League before folding. The town's junior rugby league team is still called the Goulburn Junior Stockmen.

The Goulburn Dirty Reds rugby union club play in the John I Dent Cup third grade. The club was founded in 1872, making it the oldest surviving sporting club in Goulburn and indeed, one of the oldest surviving rugby clubs in Australia. The district junior rugby union competition is based in Goulburn with teams from Crookwell, Goulburn, Braidwood & Gunning.

The Goulburn Bears Basketball team play in the Basketball NSW Waratah League (Senior). The Bears wear predominantly Navy and Sky Blue. The Bears have been representing Goulburn in Basketball for over 50 years. The Bears defeated the Wagga Wagga Wolves in the 1991 NBL1 East Grand Final.

Australian rules football has been played on and off in Goulburn since the 1930s. The first organised club was the Goulburn Waratahs, who formed in 1930 and competed in the Canberra-based CANFL competition from 1932, winning a premiership in their first season. However, the Waratahs folded in 1936, and the sport was not played in Goulburn for almost three decades, until a club called the Goulburn Hawks formed in 1965. The Hawks played in the Canberra competition until going into recess in 1998. They then reformed as the Goulburn City Swans in 2004 and entered the AFL Canberra, where they equalled the Waratahs' achievement of winning a premiership in their first season. They have played in the AFL Canberra community division since then, competing against clubs from the suburbs of Canberra and surrounding areas of New South Wales.

Other sports played in the town include soccer, cricket and tennis among others.

== Health ==
=== Goulburn Medical Clinic ===
The Goulburn Medical Clinic was established in 1946 making it the most longstanding medical practice in the city. Historically, it was the first group practice of any size established in New South Wales and probably only the third in Australia. The clinic has a mixture of general practitioners and specialists that provide comprehensive healthcare.

== Water supply ==
With a history of water shortages, an 84 km (52 mi) underground water supply pipeline was constructed to pump water from the Wingecarribee Reservoir in the Southern Highlands to Goulburn, opening in 2011. This pipeline has a capacity of 7.5 ML per day.

The $54 million water supply pipeline was at the time the largest construction project in the history of Goulburn.

== Transport ==
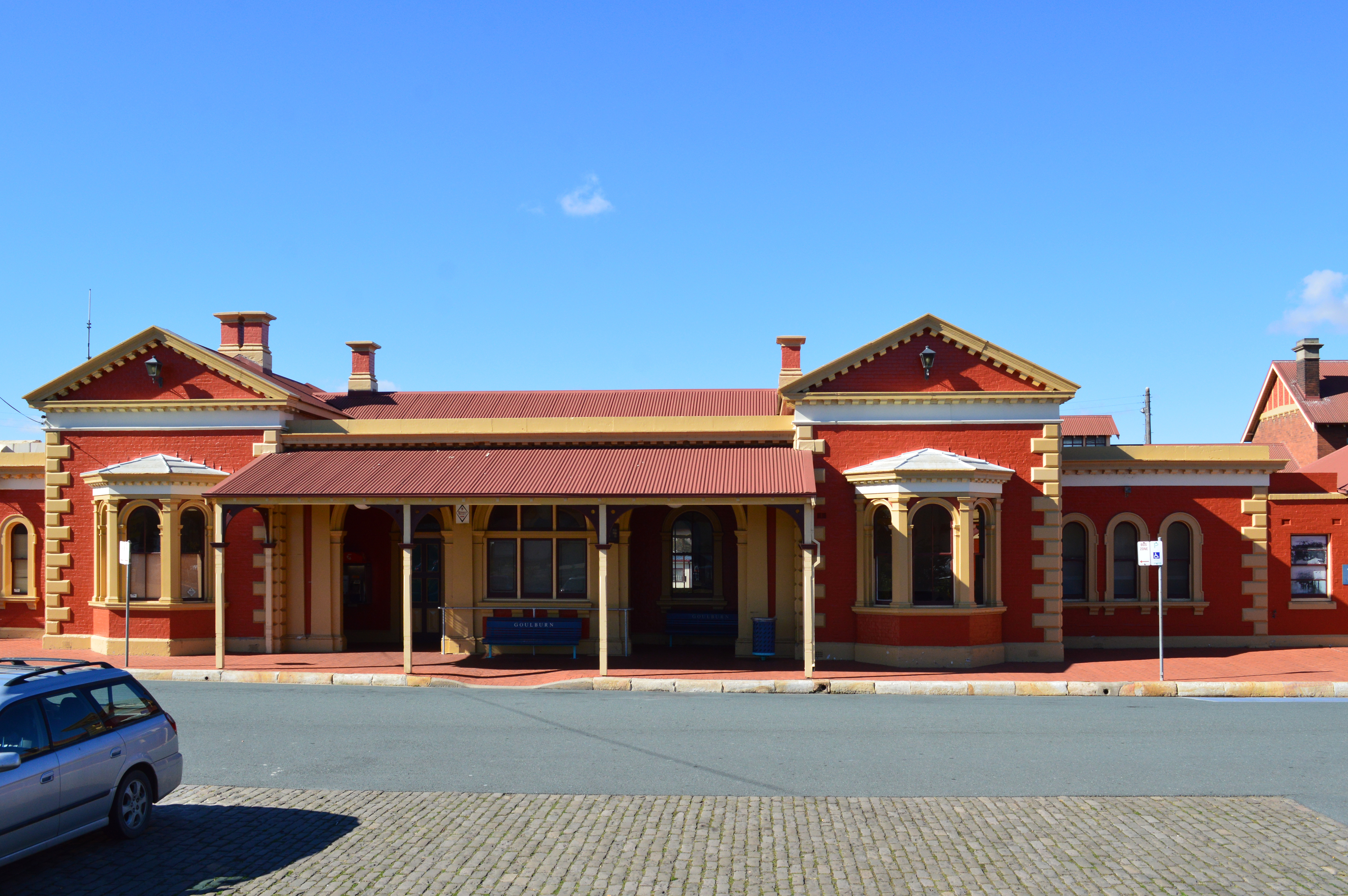
Goulburn railway station

Goulburn is approximately two hours' drive from Sydney via the Hume Highway, or a one-hour drive from Canberra via the Federal and Hume Highways. Goulburn benefited from the 1992 Hume Highway bypass, prompting significant civic rejuvenation and removing 23,000 cars from the city each day. Goulburn's city centre was populated by a notable number of eateries owned and operated by Greek migrants, as part of a broader trend of Greek cafes and milk bars in regional Australia. Years after the bypass, the main street featured numerous neon signs advertising businesses that had since gone out of business some of which are preserved today.

Goulburn railway station is the southern terminus of the Southern Highlands Line which reaches from the Sydney suburb Campbelltown and is part of the Sydney Trains intercity passenger train system. Most services for Goulburn operate to Moss Vale, some 65 km (40 mi) north-east, while there are also daily direct express Sydney Central services covered by Sydney's suburban Opal card. The station is also served by the long distance Southern XPT and Xplorer trains between Sydney and Griffith, Canberra and Melbourne Southern Cross railway station. All services are operated by NSW TrainLink.

Goulburn also has eight direct return NSW TrainLink buses to Canberra per week giving access to Canberra Airport, city and hospitals.

Goulburn Airport is approximately 7 km (4 mi) south of Goulburn and services light aircraft.

Public transport within Goulburn consists of the local taxi service that operates twenty-seven taxis, Goulburn Radio Cabs. A bus service is operated by PBC Goulburn.

== Media ==
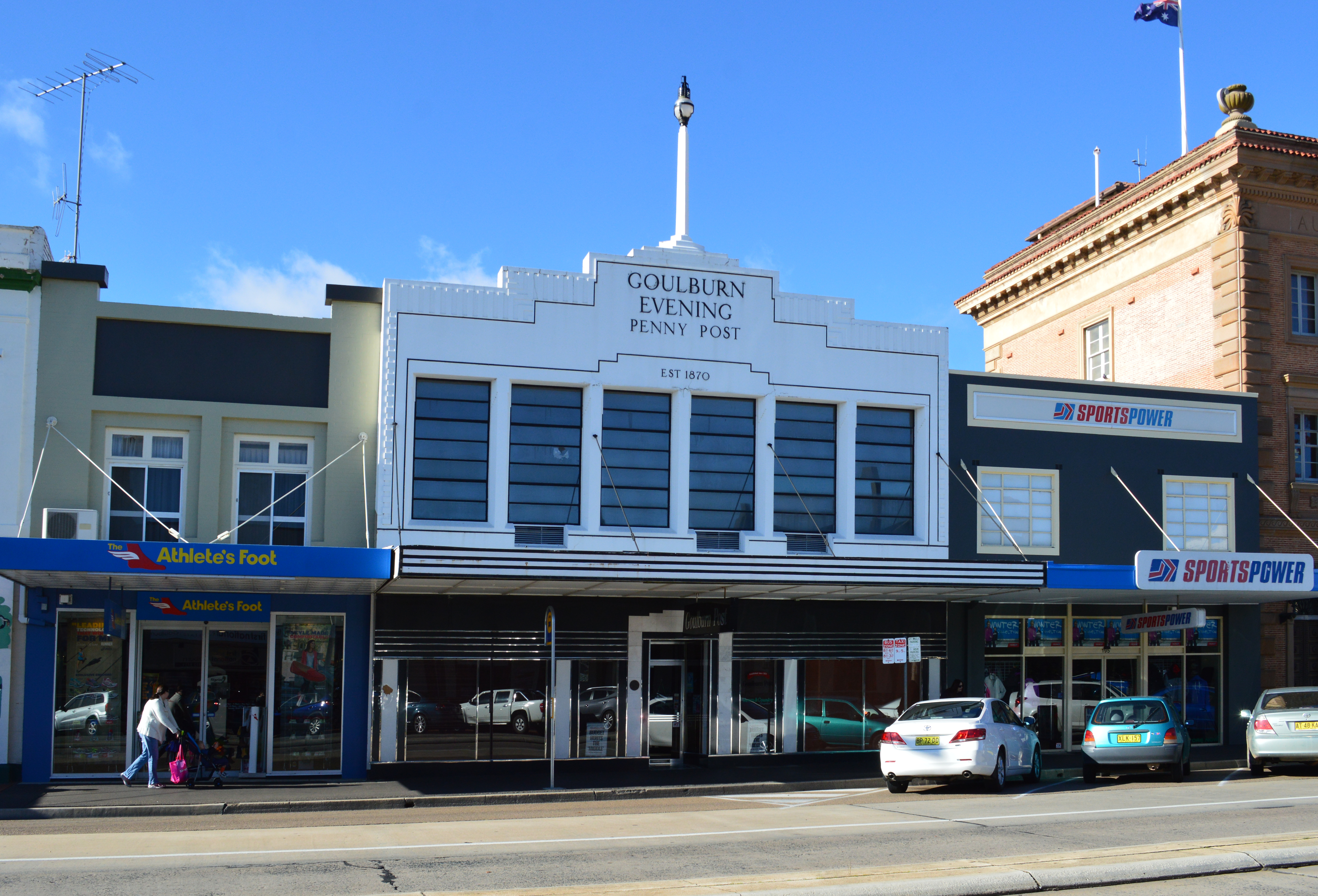
The Goulburn Penny Post building

=== Newspapers ===
The Goulburn Post, established as the Goulburn Evening Post in 1870 is Goulburn's local newspaper. It runs three times per week and is owned by Australian Community Media.

=== Radio stations ===
Radio stations with transmitters located in or nearby to Goulburn include:

AM:

- Radio National (2RN) 1098 AM

FM:

- Raw FM 87.6 (narrowcast)
- Triple J (2JJJ) 88.7 FM
- ABC Classic (2ABCFM) 89.5 FM
- ABC Central West (2ABCRR) 90.3 FM
- Eagle FM 93.5 (2SNO) (commercial)
- Sky Sports Radio 94.3 FM (narrowcast)
- ABC NewsRadio (2PNN) 99.9 FM
- Kix Country Radio 100.7 FM (narrowcast)
- 2GCR 103.3 FM (community)
- GNFM 107.7 FM (2GBN) (commercial)

Depending on location some Illawarra- and/or Canberra-based radio stations can also heard. Commercial radio services from Goulburn are also broadcast to Braidwood.

=== Television ===
Goulburn receives five free-to-air television networks relayed from Canberra, and broadcast from nearby Mt Gray:

- ABC
- SBS
- Seven
- WIN Television's Nine
- 10

A much smaller retransmission site also exists to cover residences in the suburb of Eastgrove.

== Landmarks ==
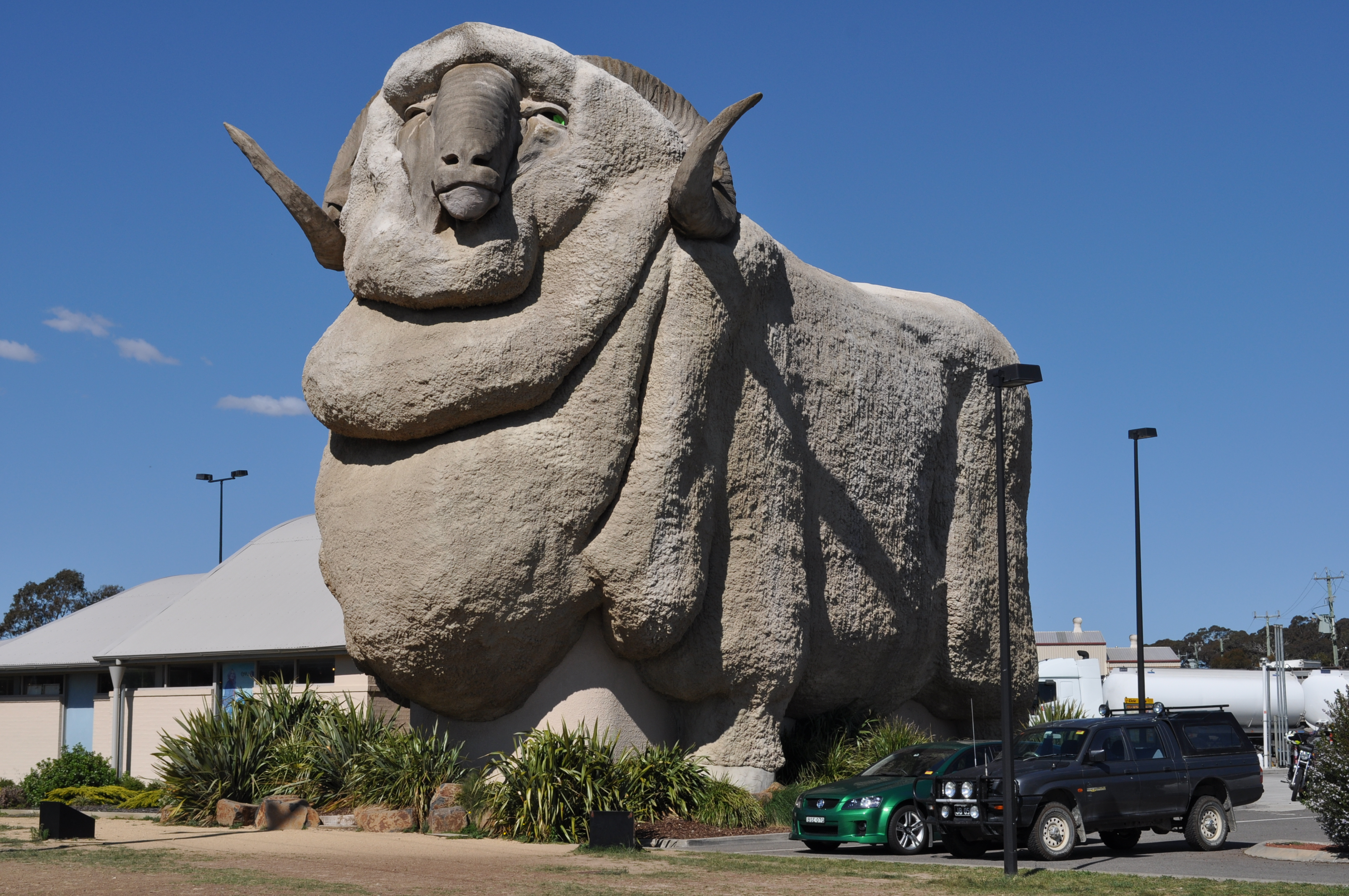
Goulburn's importance as a wool market is celebrated by this giant sculpture known as Big Merino

Goulburn's second court house was built in 1847; designed by Mortimer Lewis, the colonial architect. James Barnet, the colonial architect from 1862 to 1890, built a number of buildings in Goulburn. These included the Goulburn Gaol that opened 1884; the current court house that opened in 1887; and a post office in 1881. Barnet's successor, Walter Liberty Vernon, was responsible for the first buildings of Kenmore Hospital, completed in 1894. St Saviour's Anglican Cathedral and Hall were designed by Edmund Blacket. Building started in 1874 and it was dedicated in 1884. It was finally consecrated in 1916. A tower was added in 1988 as part of a Bicentennial project but Blacket's plans included a spire which is yet to be added. E.C. Manfred was a prominent local architect responsible for many of the buildings in the city, including the first public swimming baths opened in 1892; the old Town Hall constructed in 1888; the Goulburn Base Hospital designed in 1886; the old Fire Station built in 1890; the Masonic Temple built in 1928; he also designed the earlier building of 1890 it replaced. Goulburn's first permanent fire station built 1890 and designed by local architect E.C. Manfred. The city was home to Kenmore Hospital, a psychiatric hospital which was finally closed in 2003. Goulburn remains a hub for mental health with facilities now located at the Goulburn Base Hospital.

=== Goulburn Rail Heritage Centre ===
The roundhouse at Goulburn was a significant locomotive depot both in the steam and early diesel eras. After closure it became the Goulburn Rail Heritage Centre, a railway museum with preserved steam and diesel locomotives as well as many interesting examples of rolling stock. Some minor rail operators such as RailPower have used the site to restore diesel locomotives to working order for main line use. The Railway Barracks built in 1935 is situated opposite the roundhouse. It accommodated the steam engine drivers, and now converted into an accommodation wedding & events centre.

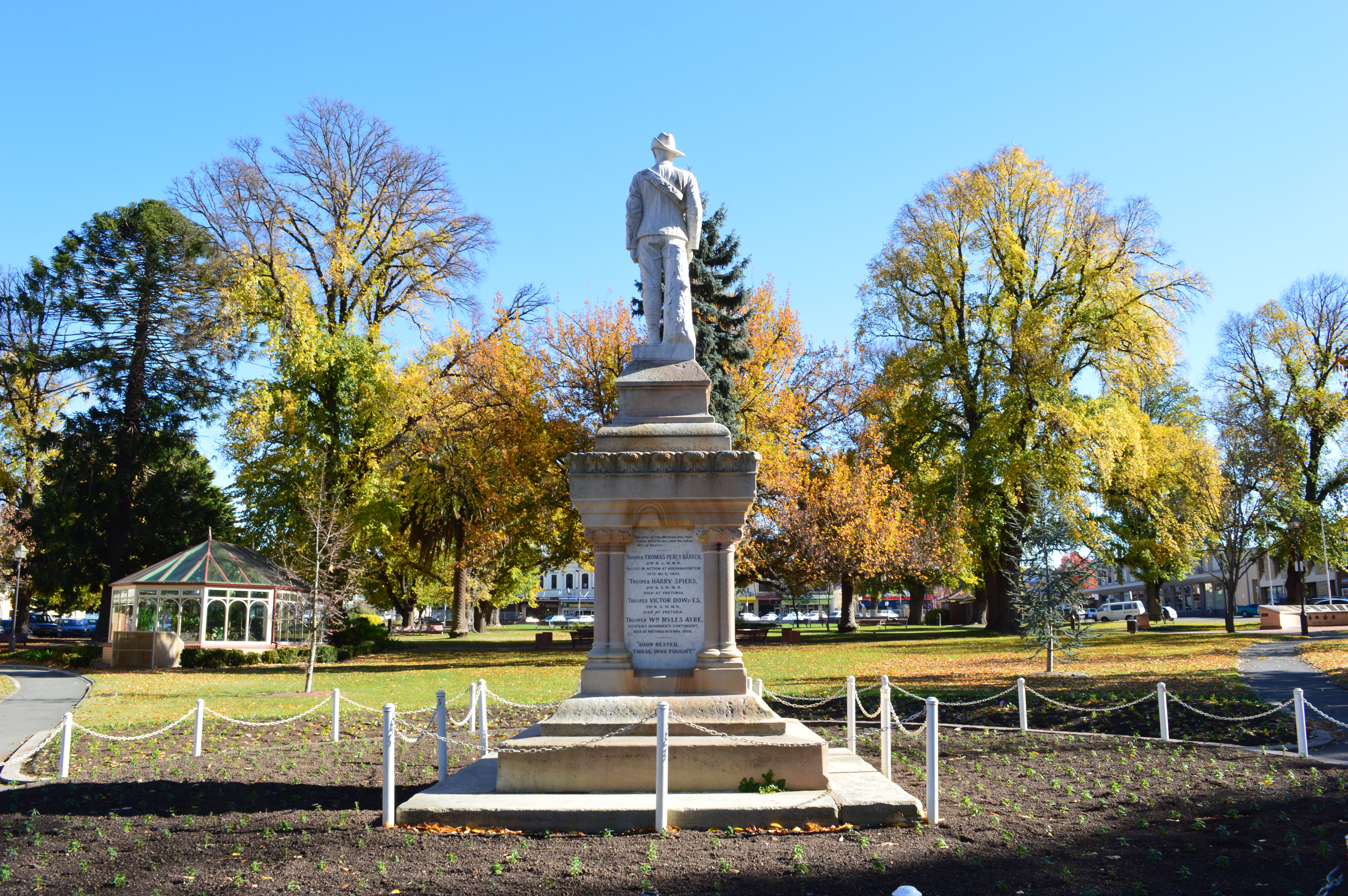
The Goulburn Boer War Memorial commemorates soldiers from the Goulburn district who fought in the Boer War

Historical population
Year	Pop.	±%
1921	12,715	—
1933	14,849	+16.8%
1947	15,991	+7.7%
1954	19,183	+20.0%
1961	20,544	+7.1%
1966	20,871	+1.6%
1971	21,606	+3.5%
1976	21,735	+0.6%
1981	21,755	+0.1%
1986	21,552	−0.9%
1991	21,451	−0.5%
1996	21,293	−0.7%
2001	20,846	−2.1%
2006	20,127	−3.4%
2011	21,484	+6.7%
2016	22,419	+4.4%
2021	23,963	+6.9%
Source: Australian Bureau of Statistics data.

== Notable people ==
- Andrew Blackshaw, international softball player
- Beatrice Bligh (1916–1973), gardener at Pejar Park
- Todd Carney, (born 1986) rugby league player
- Kyle Cranston, (born 1993) track and field athlete
- Jarrod Croker, (born 1990) rugby league player, captain Canberra Raiders (2015–)
- Bruce Devlin, former professional golfer who won 8 tournaments on the US PGA Tour
- Michael Diamond, target shooter and Olympic gold medalist
- Miles Franklin, (1879–1954) writer and feminist
- Thomas Hazelton, (born 1999) rugby league footballer
- William Hovell, (1786–1875) English-born Australian explorer is buried in one of the many cemeteries
- Rod Jackson, (born 1951) rugby league player
- George Lazenby, (born 1939) the only Australian actor to play James Bond, in On Her Majesty's Secret Service
- Donald MacDonald, (1857–1937) Australian pastoralist
- Marc McDermott, (1871–1929) American silent film star
- Peta Murphy (1973– Deceased, 2023), federal MP for the division of Dunkley, Victoria.
- Adam O'Brien, (born 1977) rugby league coach
- George Ogilvie, theatre director, born in Goulburn in 1931
- Simon Poidevin, rugby union player and World Cup winner in 1991
- Kate Ritchie, (born 1978) actress and radio host
- Sally Shaw, (born 1978) cricketer
- Ursula Stephens, senator (2002–2014)
- Glenn Turner, Kookaburras hockey player

== See also ==
- Goulburn Rugby Union
- Pejar Dam
- One Raceway
- High School, Goulburn
