= Rossi Bridge over Wollondilly River =

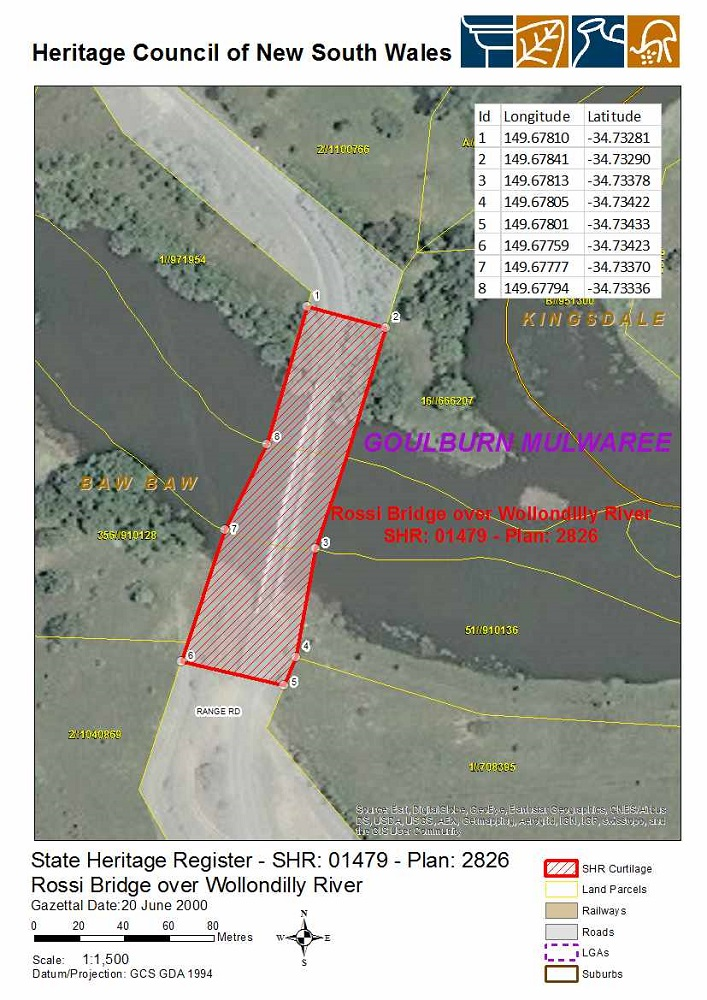
- Heritage boundaries
- Coordinates: 34°44′01″S 149°40′41″E
- Carries: Range Road
- Crosses: Wollondilly River
- Locale: Goulburn, New South Wales, Australia
- Other name(s): Rossi's Crossing
- Owner: Transport for NSW

Characteristics
- Design: Allan truss
- Material: Timber
- Pier construction: Granite
- Total length: 106.1 metres (348 ft)
- Longest span: 27.4 metres (90 ft)
- No. of spans: 5
- Piers in water: 4
- No. of lanes: 1

History
- Fabrication by: J. J. Taylor and H. F. Littleproud
- Construction end: 1899
- Construction cost: A£2,545 17s 5d
- Replaces: An earlier bridge (details unknown)

New South Wales Heritage Register
- Official name: Rossi Bridge over Wollondilly River
- Type: State heritage (built)
- Designated: 20 June 2000
- Reference no.: 01479
- Type: Road Bridge
- Category: Transport – Land

The Rossi Bridge over Wollondilly River is a heritage-listed road bridge that carries Range Road across the Wollondilly River, Goulburn, New South Wales, Australia. The bridge is owned by Transport for NSW. It is also known as Rossi's Crossing. It was added to the New South Wales State Heritage Register on 20 June 2000.

== History ==
Rossi's Crossing was a ford over the Wollondilly River used by the locals for access north west of Goulburn towards Wheeo and Crookwell. Built near the estate of F. R. L. Rossi, a well known local, near his estate, Rossiville. G. J. Clarke built the approaches.

At some stage a bridge had been built, meetings being held, but it was in disrepair as early as 1873 needing repairs by Government tender; and again in 1887, and in 1893.

Tenders for the new super structure were called in 1898. The bridge over the Wollondilly River at Rossi's Crossing was re-built in 1898-99. The contractors were J. J. Taylor and H. F. Littleproud of Bega, who had submitted a tender of A£2,545 17s 5d.

== Description ==
The bridge is a good example of the 27-metre (90 ft) Allan truss span bridge. This type was developed in 1893 and used at least until 1920. It is a [Howe-type bridge and has a number of design features. It has tension rods for verticals and these can be used to adjust the geometry and counteract shrinkage; the diagonal members were cut off square at their ends and pressed against special cast iron details and double timbers were used to allow for replacement. This bridge is unusual for its type in that it has granite piers and abutments, said to date from 1860 or earlier. The bridge was early for its type, and its design and span give it considerable technological significance.

The Rossi Bridge is a large scale example of an Allan composite timber truss bridge. The bridge is unusual because of its support by elegant masonry piers (which have not been noted under any other truss bridge in New South Wales). The truss structure and piers complement an already attractive rural landscape.

== Heritage listing ==
The Rossi Bridge over the Wollondilly River was listed on the New South Wales State Heritage Register on 20 June 2000.

== See also ==
- List of bridges in Australia
