= Alpine Lodge Motel =

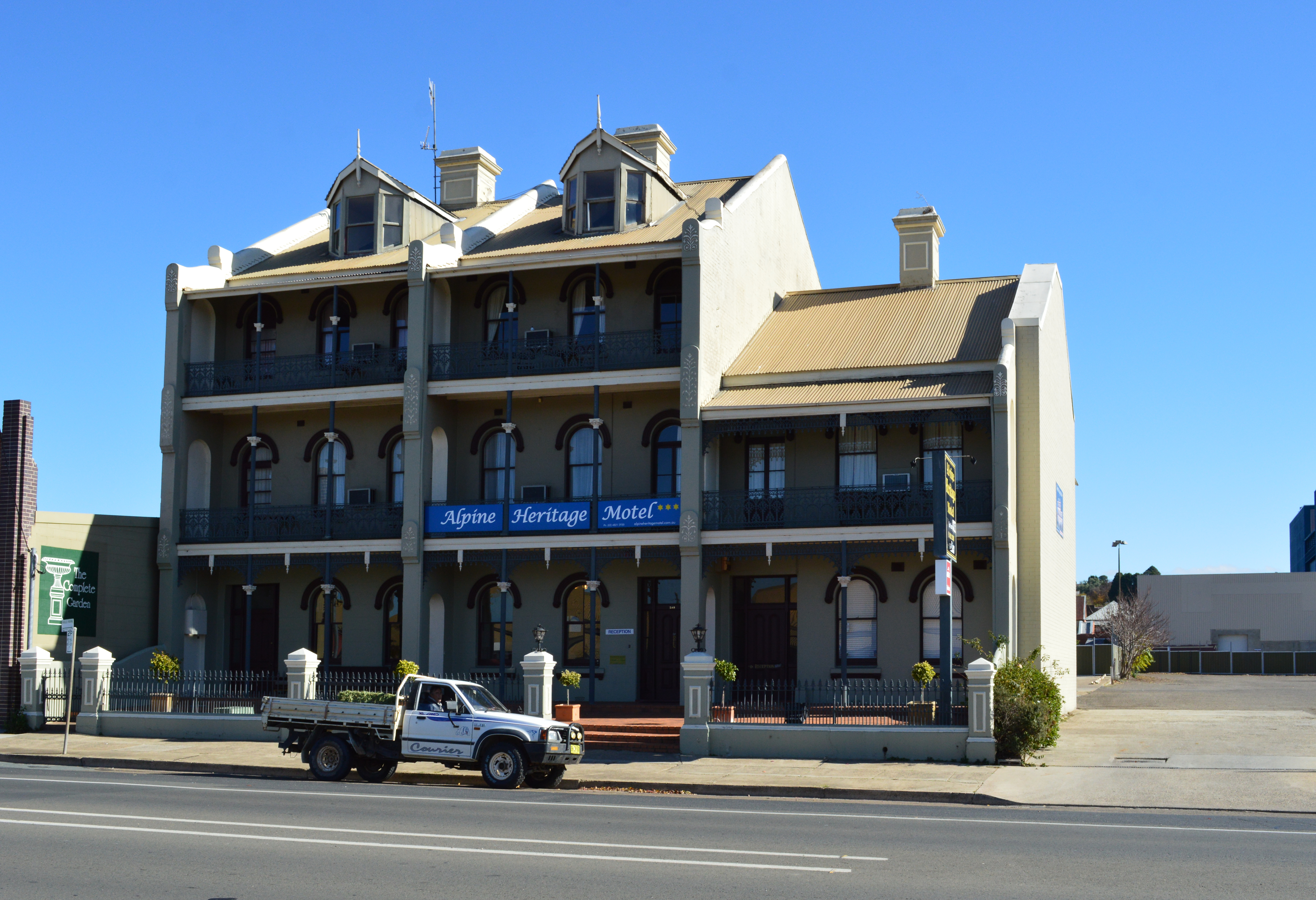
- Alpine Lodge Motel, 2013

- Location within New South Wales Location within Australia
- 34.7569°S 149.7190°E
- Location: 244–248 Sloane Street, Goulburn, Goulburn Mulwaree Council, New South Wales, Australia

Site notes
- Owner: Viewbeach Pty Ltd

New South Wales Heritage Register
- Official name: Alpine Lodge Hotel
- Type: state heritage (built)
- Designated: 2 April 1999
- Reference no.: 483
- Type: Hotel
- Category: Commercial

Alpine Lodge Motel is a heritage-listed former group of terrace houses and now motel at 244–248 Sloane Street, Goulburn, in the Southern Tablelands region of New South Wales, Australia. It was added to the New South Wales State Heritage Register on 2 April 1999.

== History ==
The buildings that now form the Alpine Lodge Motel were built in 1872 for local businessman Charles Rogers as a line of four separate terrace houses of two and three storeys. It was subsequently converted to guesthouse accommodation. In 1893, Rogers conjoined and renovated the terraces as the Temperance movement Metropolitan Coffee Palace, operated by Mr. W. Fry (also known as Fry's Coffee Palace). It continued in operation as a coffee palace under successive owners, later known as Field's Coffee Palace and Stock's Coffee Palace until at least 1911. One of the four terraces was later demolished. It was converted to modern motel accommodation in the 1990s.

== Heritage listing ==
Alpine Lodge Hotel was listed on the New South Wales State Heritage Register on 2 April 1999.
