= Goulburn Post Office =

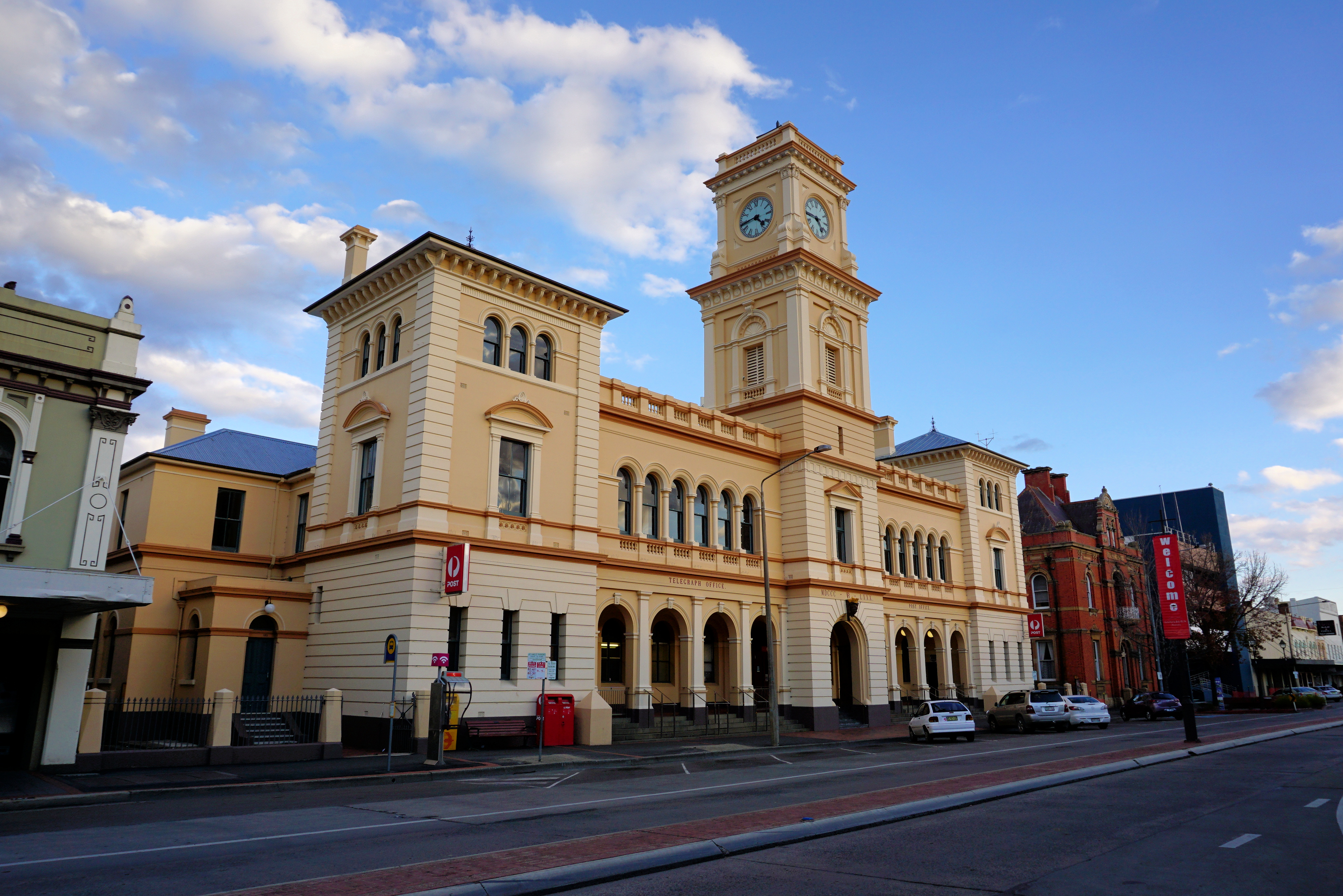

- Location within New South Wales Location within Australia
- 34.7553°S 149.7182°E
- Location: 165 Auburn Street, Goulburn, New South Wales, Australia

History
- Built: 1880–1881

Site notes
- Architect: Designed by Colonial Architect James Barnet
- Owner: Australia Post

New South Wales Heritage Register
- Official name: Goulburn Post Office; Goulburn Post and Telegraph Office; Post Office
- Type: state heritage (built)
- Designated: 22 December 2000
- Reference no.: 1424
- Type: Post Office
- Category: Postal and Telecommunications
- Builders: F Horn

Goulburn Post Office is a heritage-listed post office at 165 Auburn Street, Goulburn, New South Wales, Australia. It was designed by Colonial Architect James Barnet and built from 1880 to 1881 by F. Horn. It is also known as Goulburn Post and Telegraph Office. The property is owned by Australia Post.

== History ==
=== Background ===
The first official postal service in Australia was established in April 1809, when the Sydney merchant Isaac Nichols was appointed as the first Postmaster in the colony of New South Wales. Prior to this, mail had been distributed directly by the captain of the ship on which the mail arrived, however this system was neither reliable nor secure.

In 1825 the colonial administration was empowered to establish a Postmaster General's Department, which had previously been administered from Britain.

In 1828 the first post offices outside of Sydney were established, with offices in Bathurst, Campbelltown, Parramatta, Liverpool, Newcastle, Penrith and Windsor. By 1839 there were forty post offices in the colony, with more opened as settlement spread. During the 1860s, the advance of postal services was further increased as the railway network began to be established throughout NSW. In 1863, the Postmaster General WH Christie noted that accommodation facilities for postmasters in some post offices was quite limited, and stated that it was a matter of importance that "post masters should reside and sleep under the same roof as the office".

The first telegraph line was opened in Victoria in March 1854 and in NSW in 1858. The NSW colonial government constructed two lines from the General Post Office, Sydney, one to the South Head Signal Station, the other to Liverpool. Development was slow in NSW compared to the other states, with the Government concentrating on the development of country offices before suburban ones. As the line spread, however, telegraph offices were built to accommodate the operators. Unlike the Post Office, the telegraph office needed specialised equipment and could not be easily accommodated in a local store or private residence. Post and telegraph offices operated separately until 1870 when the departments were amalgamated, after which time new offices were built to include both postal and telegraph services. In 1881 the first telephone exchange was opened in Sydney, three years after the first tests in Adelaide. As with the telegraph, the telephone system soon began to extend into country areas, with telephone exchanges appearing in country NSW from the late 1880s onwards. Again the Post Office was responsible for the public telephone exchange, further emphasising its place in the community as a provider of communications services.

The appointment of James Barnet as Acting Colonial Architect in 1862 coincided with a considerable increase in funding to the public works program. Between 1865 and 1890 the Colonial Architects Office was responsible for the building and maintenance of 169 Post Offices and telegraph offices in NSW. The post offices constructed during this period featured in a variety of architectural styles, as Barnet argued that the local parliamentary representatives always preferred "different patterns".

The construction of new post offices continued throughout the 1890s depression years under the leadership of Walter Liberty Vernon, who held office from 1890 to 1911. While twenty-seven post offices were built between 1892 and 1895, funding to the Government Architect's Office was cut from 1893 to 1895, causing Vernon to postpone a number of projects.

Following Federation in 1901, the Commonwealth Government took over responsibility for post, telegraph and telephone offices, with the Department of Home Affairs Works Division being made responsible for post office construction. In 1916 construction was transferred to the Department of Works & Railways, with the Department of the Interior responsible during World War II.

On 22 December 1975, the Postmaster-General's Department was abolished and replaced by the Postal & Telecommunications Department. This was the creation of Telecom and Australia Post. In 1989, the Australian Postal Corporation Act established Australia Post as a self-funding entity, heralding a new direction in property management, including a move away from the larger more traditional buildings towards smaller shop front style post offices.

For much of its history, the post office has been responsible for a wide variety of community services including mail distribution, an agency for the Commonwealth Bank, electoral enrolments, and the provision of telegraph and telephone services. The town post office has served as a focal point for the community, most often built in a prominent position in the centre of town close to other public buildings, creating a nucleus of civic buildings and community pride.

=== Goulburn Post Office ===
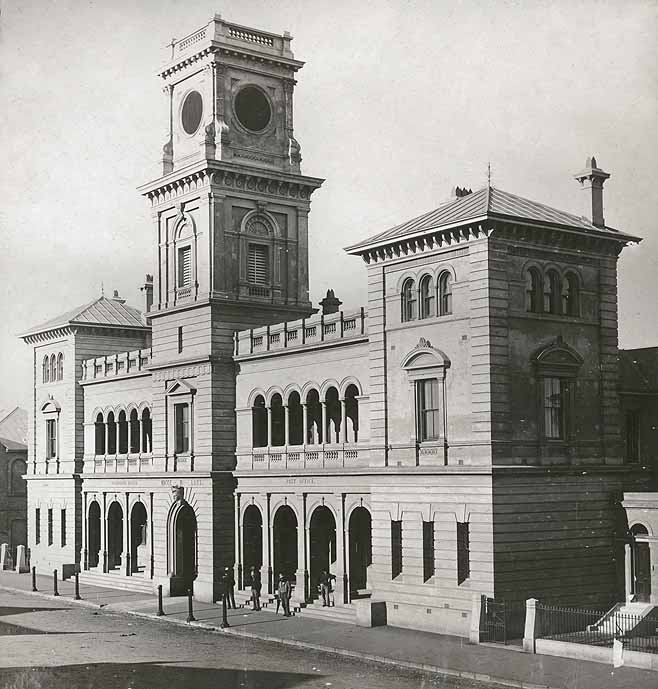
Goulburn Post Office in the early 1880s

The first post office in Goulburn was opened on 1 January 1832, just three years after the town was founded and only four years after the first country offices had been opened. The first postmaster was Robert Smith, Clerk to the Chamber of Magistrates, who received 20% of the postage collected as a salary. This meant a total of £2.12.9 in 1832 rising to £8.14.7 in 1833. At this time the mail was conveyed from Sydney to Goulburn via Liverpool, Campbelltown and Bong Bong, by mounted police once per week.

In 1848 the mail was being delivered to Goulburn three times a week by Andrew Badgery. Badgery was paid £400 per year to deliver mail to Goulburn, Braidwood and Queanbeyan via Bungendore using a two horse cart along his route. In July 1856, letter receivers, the forerunner of postboxes, were bought into operation by the Post Office in NSW with twelve iron receivers being placed in Sydney. In 1859 the first four receivers were erected in country towns, with two being placed in Goulburn; one in Auburn Street and the second in Grafton Street.

Goulburn became a full-time official Post Office on 1 September 1862 and Postmaster James Scrowcroft's salary was increased from £200 to £300. During the same year, money orders were introduced into the NSW postal system and it was thought preferable by the Colonial Government to have official Postmasters in larger offices not connected with any other businesses in town. Scrowcroft then became the first official full-time Postmaster in Goulburn, which in turn was the second busiest country post office in NSW, after Bathurst, issuing money orders.

By the 1870s Goulburn had taken on the mantle of a prominent regional centre. Declared a municipality in 1859, it had grown through the 1860s to become a new Anglican bishopric in 1863 and the seat of a Roman Catholic diocese in 1867. In May 1869 the Main Southern railway line reached Goulburn, allowing the mail to be in Sydney within seven hours. By 1870 the town boasted four newspapers, and in 1871 an agency for the New South Wales Government Savings Bank opened in Goulburn Post Office. In 1875 the post office was operating out of a rented premise in Market Street, but calls for a new official post office building were beginning to grow as postal business increased.

In 1878 the Colonial Architect, James Barnet, began on the plans for the new office at Goulburn. Unlike some of the other country offices in NSW, the planning and building of the Goulburn office went smoothly. Built by local builder F. Horn, the post office was officially opened in 1881 by the Postmaster-General Francis Bathurst Suttor and was attended by the Postmaster William Johnson, John Robertson, Colonel Hollowbrow, the mayor and other dignitaries. Parades of mounted police, local bands and schoolchildren added to the spectacle, with a public holiday proclaimed in Goulburn to celebrate. The finished building won immediate approbation, with Barnet being praised for designing such a noble structure.

In 1891 the Goulburn Telephone Exchange opened as one of only four country exchanges. By 1892, however, there were only 18 subscribers.

In 1981, Goulburn Post Office celebrated its centenary year being then closed for renovations during 1985–86. A total refurbishment of the office included repainting of the exterior in the c. 1881 paint scheme, a rearrangement of the counter area inside, new office accommodation for the postmaster and staff and recarpeting of the office. Lighting was provided along the colonnade to highlight the architectural features, a new loading bay and conveyor were also constructed adjacent to the mailroom to allow easier access to mail trucks. The first floor of the building was completely refurbished and fitted out to house Australia Post's Divisional Manager, Southern Tablelands Division and staff. The work was completed by Hexen Constructions of the Australian Capital Territory at a total cost of $870,000, of which $75,000 was used on structural repairs and stabilisation and $26,000 on the provision of a disabled access ramp.

== Description ==
Goulburn Post Office was built in 1880–81, and is located on Auburn Street, the main street of Goulburn's central business district facing west. It is an imposing, three-storey, symmetrical, rendered Victorian Italianate building featuring a dominant four and a half-storey clock tower at the centre of the front facade. The building has a predominantly hipped roof, with rolled zinc sheet pyramidal roofs at the north and south turrets and some rolled zinc clad, flat roof sections towards the rear. The majority of the roof is clad in fibrous cement tiles (possibly asbestos), with concrete on the rear first floor deck. Eleven rendered chimneys with moulded tops and painted with light green detailing punctuate the roof.

Additions to the Post Office do not appear to have been extensive, and include relatively minor changes with the infill of the original central driveway through the centre of the building, the addition of a conveyor and rear dock area and rear boiler room and fire escape.

There are two ground-floor colonnades as part of the front facade, symmetrical about the arched front entry porch. They each have red and brown tiled floors. There is a shallow-vaulted ashlar rendered soffit at the southern colonnade with a moulded cornice, flat plasterboard soffit at the northern colonnade with a coved cornice and board and batten soffit at the centre entry porch with a moulded cornice. There are pendant lights in each colonnade and the steps are slate at the centre porch and concrete at the colonnades. While the original first-floor front verandahs have been infilled, there is a concrete rear deck at the centre of the first floor with parapet balustrade and access to the steel fire escape.

The building is constructed of predominantly cream painted ashlar rendered brickwork, with painted English Bond brick rear sections and a high, continuous, ashlar rendered base course painted an apricot colour. Detailing of the building is in light green and apricot, with dark green window frames. It is classically inspired, incorporating arched openings, small pediments, pilasters on the sides of the upper-floor openings, a balustraded parapet on the roof of the colonnade sections, and balustrade at the first floor level. Fenestration and detailing of the building is symmetrical about the centre tower.

The ground-floor interior comprises four main functional areas, dispersed across this level. These include the carpeted and sheet vinyl office areas towards the centre and southern end, staff facilities with modern tiling and sheet vinyl flooring at either end, carpeted retail area at the centre and sheet vinyl mail room, delivery and storage areas, also located at each end of the building.

Ceilings of the ground-floor are varied. There are plasterboard ceilings with coved cornices in most store rooms, female locker rooms, southern entry porch, and stair hall and in the northern half of the building. There are board and batten ceilings in the offices, southern store rooms and parts of the rear hallway, plaster and batten ceilings in the retail area with a moulded cornice, suspended ceiling in the centre-southern office and an elaborate moulded ceiling and ceiling rose in the lunch room. The ground-floor is lit by pendant and fluorescent lighting and there is air-conditioning ducting installed in the suspended ceiling and walls of the centre-southern office.

Architraves appear to be in the original building fabric, particularly the outer wall openings, with later architraves in the more recent fitouts in standard Australia Post colours. Skirting appears to be early or reproduction.

Internal doors of the ground-floor are modern flush and security doors, with some original four panel doors retained. There are two pane upper and lower sash windows with arched top sashes in the ground-floor outer walls, and internal fixed glazing in later partition walls.

Ground-floor walls are mainly rendered brick in a grey colour scheme in the retail areas, and a cream and apricot scheme to the rest of the floor. There are wide plain arches in the retail area, moulded arches to the stairwells and timber and plasterboard partitions with fixed glazing enclosing the offices. The front entry foyer is lined with early timber panelling, with matching timber and glass double doors and there is a standard Australia Post fitout of the retail area. Fireplaces on the ground-floor have been completely removed.

There are multiple stairs within Goulburn Post Office, and the stair complexes are mirrored on the opposite side of the building. They are mainly constructed of polished timber, with turned posts and balusters, sheet vinyl treads and painted carved brackets. Skirting on the stairs appears original, and the smaller upper-floor stairs are largely carpeted.

The first floor is currently vacant and comprises two main functional areas separated by the central tower. The first floor is predominantly carpeted open plan office space, with some enclosed offices, storage, and sheet vinyl and tiled staff facilities.

The ceilings of the first-floor are varied. The northern side of the building is mainly plasterboard with a coved cornice. It has suspended yellow air-conditioning ducting and suspended fluorescent and pendant lights. The southern side of the building has plasterboard ceiling with moulded cornices and v-joint boarded ceilings in the halls and kitchen. There are board and batten ceilings in the southern store room and a moulded plaster ceiling with ceiling rose in the south-western room.

Architraves on the first-floor appear to be original, or at least early, on the original openings and skirting also appears to be original or early.

Windows on this level are predominantly two pane upper and lower sash windows, with squared or arched top sashes. Internal doors are a combination of recent flush doors and early as well as reproduction four panel doors.

Walls of the first floor comprise rendered and painted brick walls with moulded arches over the stairs. There are also glass and timber c. 1980 office partitions to the large spaces and some plasterboard partition walls. The first-floor is decorated in a mainly cream and tan colour scheme with stained timber detailing. Fireplaces have been bricked in or removed, with no surrounds retained.

The large clock tower is accessed via the first floor at the centre, up a series of stairs and ladders. The original clock mechanism has been removed from its original position and the clock has been converted to an electric mechanism. The interior of the clock tower has rendered and painted walls, recent timber floors and recent clock faces. The bells currently do not chime.

Goulburn Post Office signage is confined to standard Australia Post signs attached to either end of the building on the front facade, with a small location sign and details to the right side of the centre arched entry. Lettering indicates "Telegraph Office" to the northern side over the colonnade and "Post Office" to the southern side.

Goulburn Post Office is located within predominantly two-storey, late nineteenth to late twentieth-century commercial and retail shopfront surroundings, with the adjacent three storey, late nineteenth-century Town Hall to the south and the grand Goulburn Court House with its well manicured gardens to the east. There is also the intrusive red brick three to four-storey Telstra building on the southeastern corner of the site. There are mature trees along the footpath in front of the Post Office, the path being paved with bitumen and brick pavers and the rear yard of the building is concreted.

Goulburn Post Office currently has a few small, single-storey later outbuildings in the rear yard. These include a weatherboard storage and cycle shed and small rendered brick electricity substation along the northern boundary, and a face brick early building at the north-eastern corner of the site, not currently part of the Post Office property. There is also a 1980s carport to the rear over an exterior conveyor belt and loading dock.

=== Condition ===
The condition of Goulburn Post Office is generally very good, however there is some cracking and damage evident from removal of items such as wall plugs, as seen in the turret rooms, and there is general wear and tear to both levels.

The archaeological potential of the site is considered high, as the rear of the site is quite open. There is the potential for remnants related to earlier buildings or uses of the site, particularly with the proximity of the Post Office to the gardens to the east and Court House on the former gaol site.

The exterior fabric is substantially intact, with some changes to the interior fabric over time resulting from retail and other functional requirements. Goulburn Post Office retains the features which make it culturally significant, including the arcaded loggia, prominent tower with classical motifs and symmetry, along with its overall grand scale, form and architectural style.

Intrusive elements include the concrete ramp to the southern end of the front facade, the telephone booth structure to the north-west corner and the large face brick Telstra building to the rear. The suspended ceilings and exposed air conditioning ducting are intrusive to the ground floor.

=== Modifications and dates ===
The original building comprising Post and Telegraph Offices with residences above and a central clocktower was completed and opened in 1881, with a central driveway through the current front entry porch, that has since been infilled to create what is the current retail area. The date of this infill is not known.

Goulburn Post Office was renovated during 1985–86. This included repainting of the exterior in the presumed c. 1881 paint scheme, a rearrangement of the counter area inside, new office accommodation for the postmaster and staff and recarpeting of the office. Lighting was provided along the colonnade to highlight the architectural features, a new loading bay and conveyor were also constructed adjacent to the mailroom at the rear. The first floor of the building was completely refurbished and fitted out to house Australia Post's Divisional Manager, Southern Tablelands Division and staff. Also included in these renovations was the provision of a disabled access ramp.

The installation of the north-western corner public telephone booth structure, and possibly the installation of the steel fire escape between the Telstra building and the Post Office at the rear occurred during the 1980s.

The retail fitout to the ground floor, including display wall panelling and laminated counters in a grey colour scheme, was carried out in the mid-1990s.

New flooring was installed in the clocktower during extensive renovations and included new clock faces and electric clock motor in 1999. The original clock mechanism has been removed and is currently housed in the lower level of the clock tower.

== Heritage listing ==
Goulburn Post Office is significant at a State level for its historical associations, aesthetic qualities and social value. Goulburn Post Office is linked with the original postal services established in 1832 and, as such, is associated with the early development of the town. The form and scale of Goulburn Post Office reflects the city's status as a thriving regional centre in the late nineteenth century. Goulburn Post Office also provides evidence of the changing nature of postal and telecommunications practices in NSW.

Goulburn Post Office is aesthetically significant because it is a particularly distinctive example of the Victorian Italianate style, and is a central landmark feature of Goulburn's main thoroughfare. Along with the Town Hall, former Mechanics Institute and Court House, Goulburn Post Office forms an important civic group of buildings that help define the historic character of the city. Goulburn Post Office was designed by NSW Colonial Architect's Office James Barnet, a key practitioner of the Victorian Italianate style of architecture. Goulburn Post Office is also considered to be significant to the Goulburn community's sense of place.

Goulburn Post Office was listed on the New South Wales State Heritage Register on 22 December 2000 having satisfied the following criteria.

The place is important in demonstrating the course, or pattern, of cultural or natural history in New South Wales.

Goulburn Post Office is linked with the original postal services established in 1832 and, as such, is associated with the early development of the town. The current Goulburn Post Office has been the centre of communications for the city and surrounding region for over a century. The form and scale of Goulburn Post Office also reflects the city's status as a thriving regional centre in the late nineteenth century. These features, along with the celebrations at the time of the official opening of the post office, also provide an insight into the way of life in Goulburn during this period. Goulburn Post Office also provides evidence of the changing nature of postal and telecommunications practices in NSW. Goulburn Post Office was designed by Colonial Architect James Barnet, a key practitioner of the Victorian Italianate style of architecture.

The place is important in demonstrating aesthetic characteristics and/or a high degree of creative or technical achievement in New South Wales.

Goulburn Post Office is aesthetically significant because it is a distinctive example of the Victorian Italianate style, with finely scaled detailing and characteristics including the classical motifs on the tower and the bracketed eaves. The grand scale, architectural style and location of the building, along with the prominent corner clock tower, also make it a focal point defining the character of Goulburn's main thoroughfare, endowing it with landmark qualities. The scale and style of the building compares with Tamworth Post Office. Along with the Town Hall, former Mechanics Institute and Court House, Goulburn Post Office forms an important civic group of buildings which help define the historic character of the city.

The place has a strong or special association with a particular community or cultural group in New South Wales for social, cultural or spiritual reasons.

As a prominent local landmark and the centre of communications for the town for over a century, Goulburn Post Office is considered to be highly significant to the Goulburn community's sense of place.

The place has potential to yield information that will contribute to an understanding of the cultural or natural history of New South Wales.

The site has some potential to contain archaeological information relating to the previous use of the site and the evolution of the building and out-buildings associated with the use by the Post Office.

The place possesses uncommon, rare or endangered aspects of the cultural or natural history of New South Wales.

The grand scale, architectural style and prominence of Goulburn Post Office combine to make it a rare example of country post offices in NSW. Although now modified, the central driveway is an unusual design feature, adding to the rarity of the building.

The place is important in demonstrating the principal characteristics of a class of cultural or natural places/environments in New South Wales.

Goulburn Post Office is a strong example of the Victorian Italianate style of architecture. It is part of the group of nineteenth-century post offices in NSW designed by Colonial Architect James Barnet.
