= Sally Shaw =

Australian cricketer (born 1978)

Personal information
- Born: 19 September 1978 (age 48); Goulburn, New South Wales, Australia
- Batting: Right-handed
- Role: Opening batter

Domestic team information
- Years: Team
- 2000/01: New South Wales

Career statistics
Competition	WLA
Matches	2
Runs scored	10
Batting average	10.00
100s/50s	0/0
Top score	10
Catches/stumpings	0/–
- Source: CricketArchive, 9 July 2021

Sally Shaw (born 19 September 1978) is a former Australian cricketer. A right-handed opening batter, she played two List A matches for New South Wales during the 2000–01 season of the Women's National Cricket League (WNCL).
