= Mulwaree River =

Coordinates: 34°31′S 149°53′E

Mulwaree Mulwaree Ponds, Mulwaree Creek, Merigan Creek

Location
- Country: Australia
- State: New South Wales
- Region: Sydney Basin (IBRA), Southern Tablelands
- Local government areas: Goulburn Mulwaree

Physical characteristics
- Source: Hammonds Hill, Mount Fairy
  - location: east of Lake George
  - elevation: 841 m (2,759 ft)
- Mouth: confluence with the Wollondilly River
  - location: North Goulburn
  - elevation: 624 m (2,047 ft)
- Length: 66 km (41 mi)

Basin features
- River system: Hawkesbury-Nepean catchment
- Tributaries
  - left: Bongaralaby Creek, Crisps Creek

The Mulwaree River, a perennial river that is part of the Hawkesbury-Nepean catchment, is located in the Southern Tablelands region of New South Wales, Australia.

== Course and features ==
The Mulwaree River rises east of the Lake George Escarpment, below Mount Fairy, near the locality of Hammonds Hill, and flows generally north northeast, joined by two minor tributaries, before reaching its confluence with the Wollondilly River at North Goulburn. The river descends 218 metres (715 ft) over its 66-kilometre (41 mi) course.

Tributaries include Bongaralaby Creek and Crisps Creek.

The Mulwaree and its associated wetlands are important breeding grounds and drought refuge for Australian birds. These wetlands are listed on the directory of Important Wetlands of Australia.

== See also ==
- Lake Bathurst (New South Wales)
- Lake George (New South Wales)
- List of rivers of New South Wales (L–Z)
- List of rivers of Australia
- Rivers of New South Wales
