= Colonial Mutual Life Building, Hobart =

Building in Hobart, Australia

Colonial Mutual Life Building
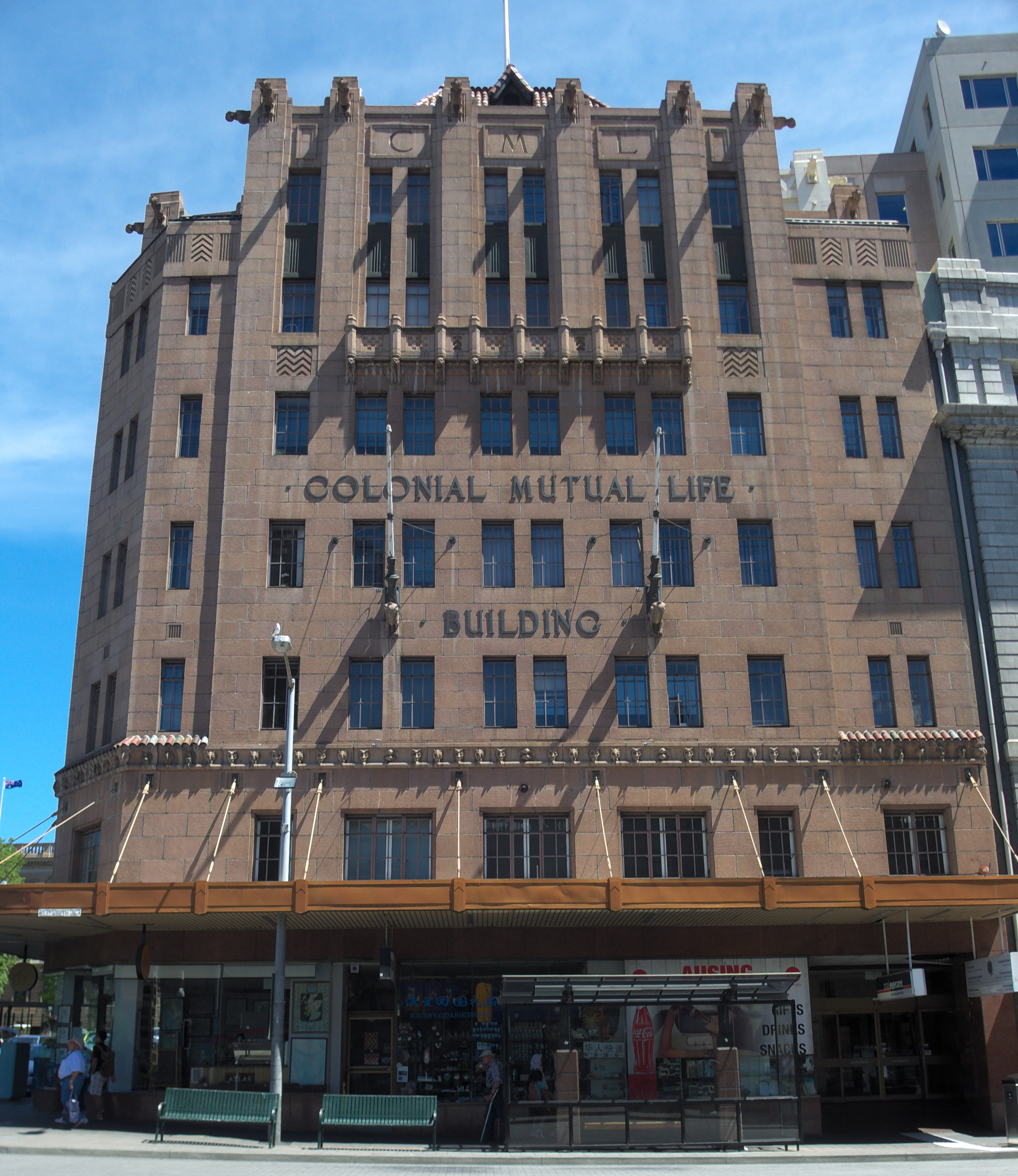
- The Colonial Mutual Life Building in 2017
- Interactive map of the Colonial Mutual Life Building area

General information
- Location: Hobart, Australia
- Coordinates: 42.882771°S 147.329891°E

The Colonial Mutual Life Building is a historic commercial building in Hobart, Australia.

== History ==
The building was constructed in 1936 to a design by the Sydney firm Hennessy & Hennessy.

In 1987, the building was sold by the Colonial Mutual Life Assurance Society to a trust of the Nettlefold family for AUD 1.76 million. It was later acquired in 2008 by a syndicate of private investors for AUD 2.75 million, and subsequently purchased by Colonial Properties Pty Ltd in 2019 for AUD 6.1 million.

== Description ==
The building occupies a corner lot in central Hobart, at the intersection of Elizabeth Street and Macquarie Street, near Hobart Town Hall. An example of stripped classicism, it nevertheless incorporates Neo-Gothic and Art Deco elements. It is included in the Royal Australian Institute of Architects’ list of notable Tasmanian buildings of the 20th century.
