= Colonial Mutual Life Building, Goulburn =

CML Building
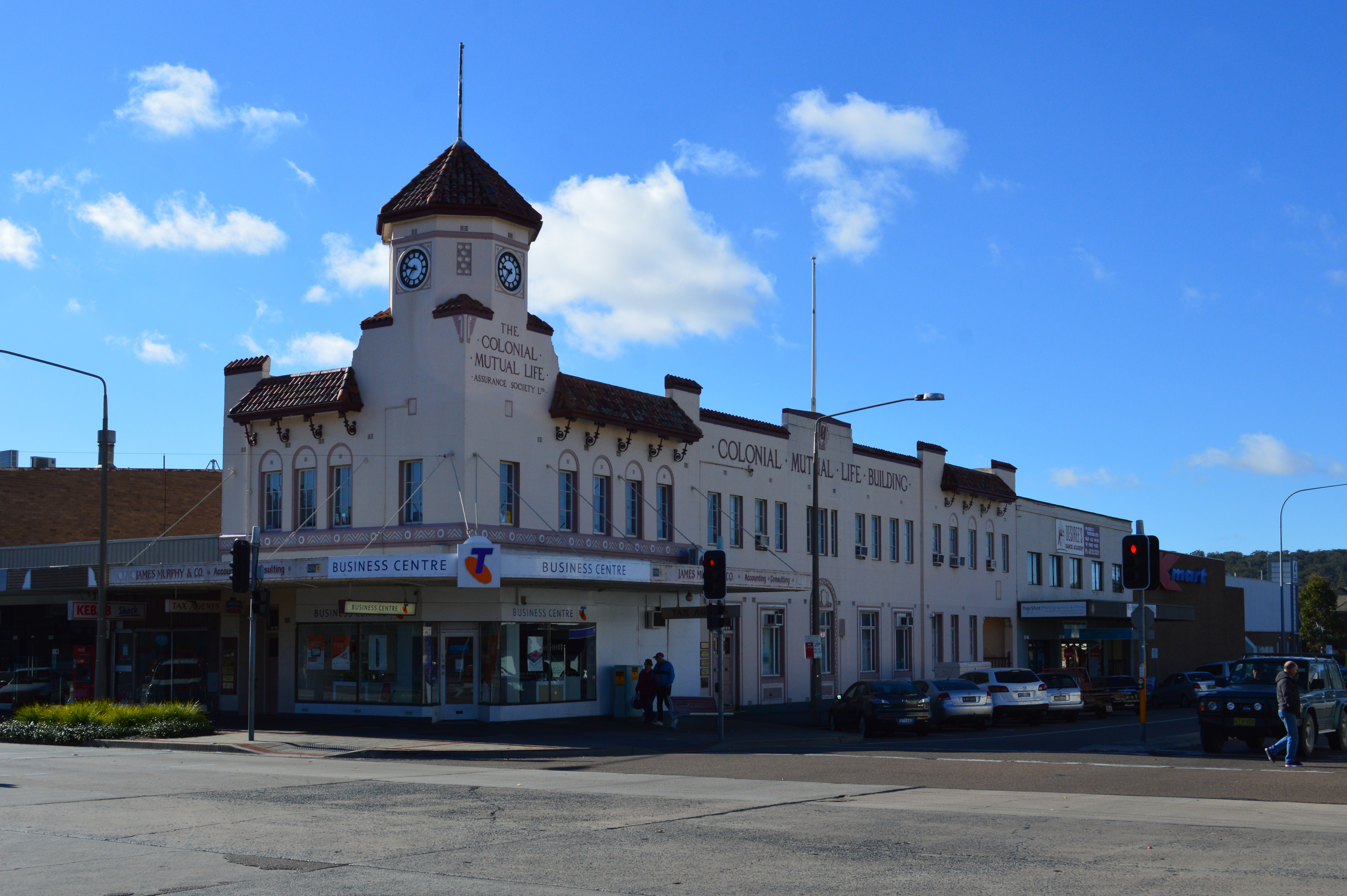

- Location within New South Wales Location within Australia
- 34.7529°S 149.7203°E
- Location: Clifford Street, Goulburn, Goulburn Mulwaree Council, New South Wales, Australia

Site notes
- Owner: Glenola (Holdings) Pty Ltd

New South Wales Heritage Register
- Official name: CML Building
- Type: state heritage (built)
- Designated: 2 April 1999
- Reference no.: 129
- Type: Insurance company/building
- Category: Commercial

The Colonial Mutual Life Building is a heritage-listed insurance office at Clifford Street, Goulburn, Goulburn Mulwaree Council, New South Wales, Australia. It is also known as the CML Building. It was added to the New South Wales State Heritage Register on 2 April 1999.

== History ==
It was designed by Hennessy, Hennessy & Co. and built by Concrete Constructions Ltd. The design was for a two-storey building, built in brick and reinforced concrete, featuring a large shop on the corner of Auburn and Clifford Streets with access to the banking chamber and professional offices on the remainder of the ground floor, with further offices and a dental suite on the first floor and a clock tower at the corner of the building. In addition to the Colonial Mutual Life offices, it also included a branch of the Bank of New South Wales. The work was described as a "reconstruction" of the former Australian Bank of Commerce premises which had previously occupied the site.

The Colonial Mutual Life office operated out of the building until it closed in 1979.

In 2017, the building received $35,000 in heritage funding for patching and repainting of the building's exterior and a disability access upgrade.

== Description ==
The building has been described as being in the Spanish mission style.

== Heritage listing ==
The CML Building was listed on the New South Wales State Heritage Register on 2 April 1999.
