= Pomeroy, New South Wales =

Pomeroy
- Town
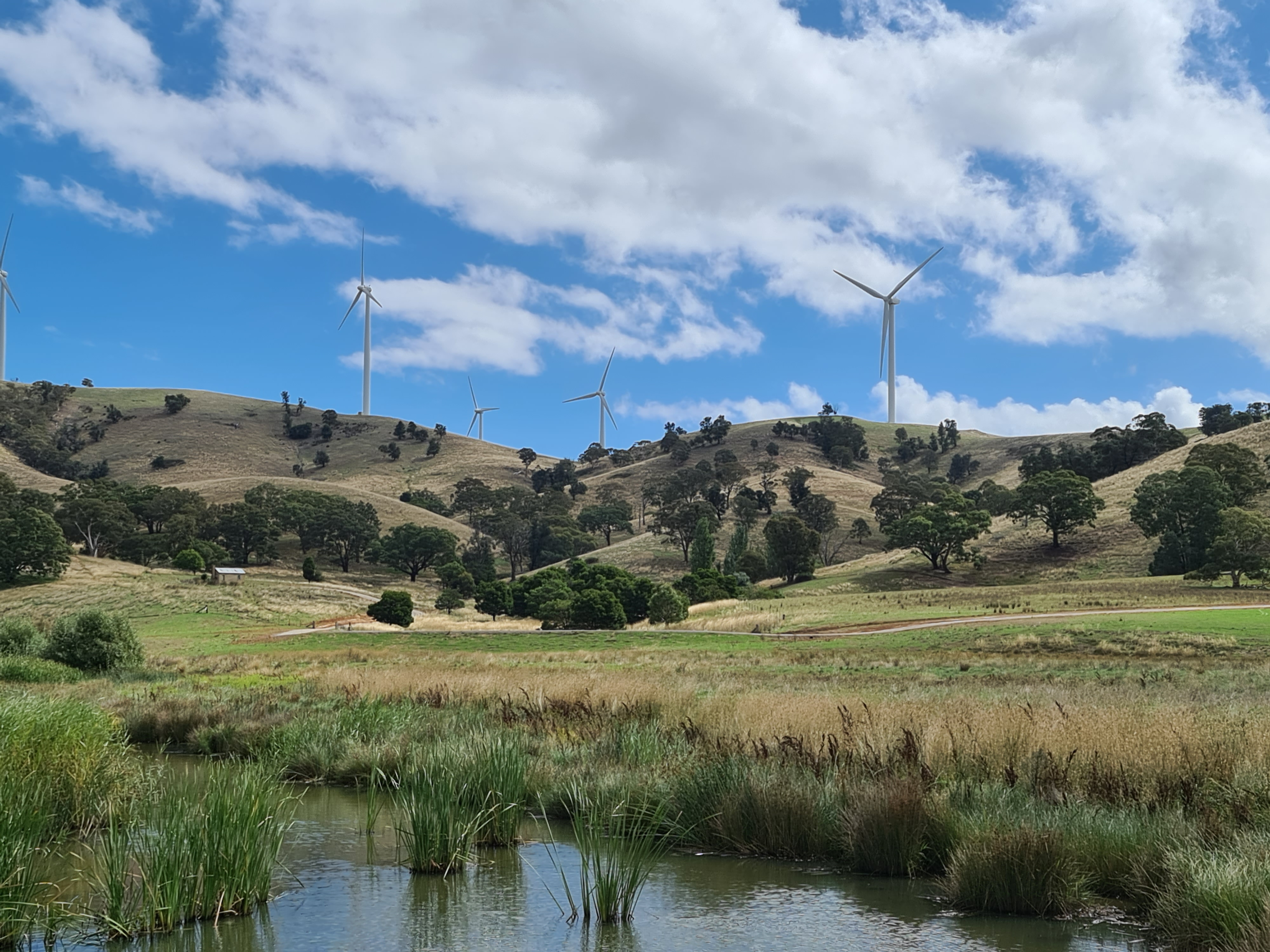
- Wollondilly River in Pomeroy

- Coordinates: 34°39′24″S 149°30′04″E
- Country: Australia
- State: New South Wales
- Region: Southern Tablelands
- LGAs: Goulburn Mulwaree; Upper Lachlan
- Location: 105 km (65 mi) NE of Canberra; 25 km (16 mi) NW of Goulburn; 220 km (140 mi) SW of Sydney

Government
  - State electorate: Goulburn
  - Federal divisions: Eden-Monaro; Riverina
- Elevation: 659 m (2,162 ft)

Population
  - Total: 94 (SAL 2021)
- Postcode: 2580
- County: Argyle
- Parish: Pomeroy
Localities around Pomeroy
| Bannister | Mummel | Baw Baw |
| Gurrundah | Pomeroy | Baw Baw |
| Gurrundah | Parkesbourne | Yarra |

Pomeroy is a locality on the border of Goulburn Mulwaree Council and Upper Lachlan Shire in New South Wales, Australia. It lies on the upper Wollondilly River, about 23 kilometers (14 mi) northwest of Goulburn and 110 kilometers (68 mi) northeast of Canberra. At the 2016 census, it had a population of 115.

Pomeroy had a state school from 1868 to 1915. This was described at different times as a "public school", a "half-time school" or a "provisional school". Prior to January 1876, it was called Mummell Public School.
