= Roslyn, New South Wales =

Roslyn
- Town
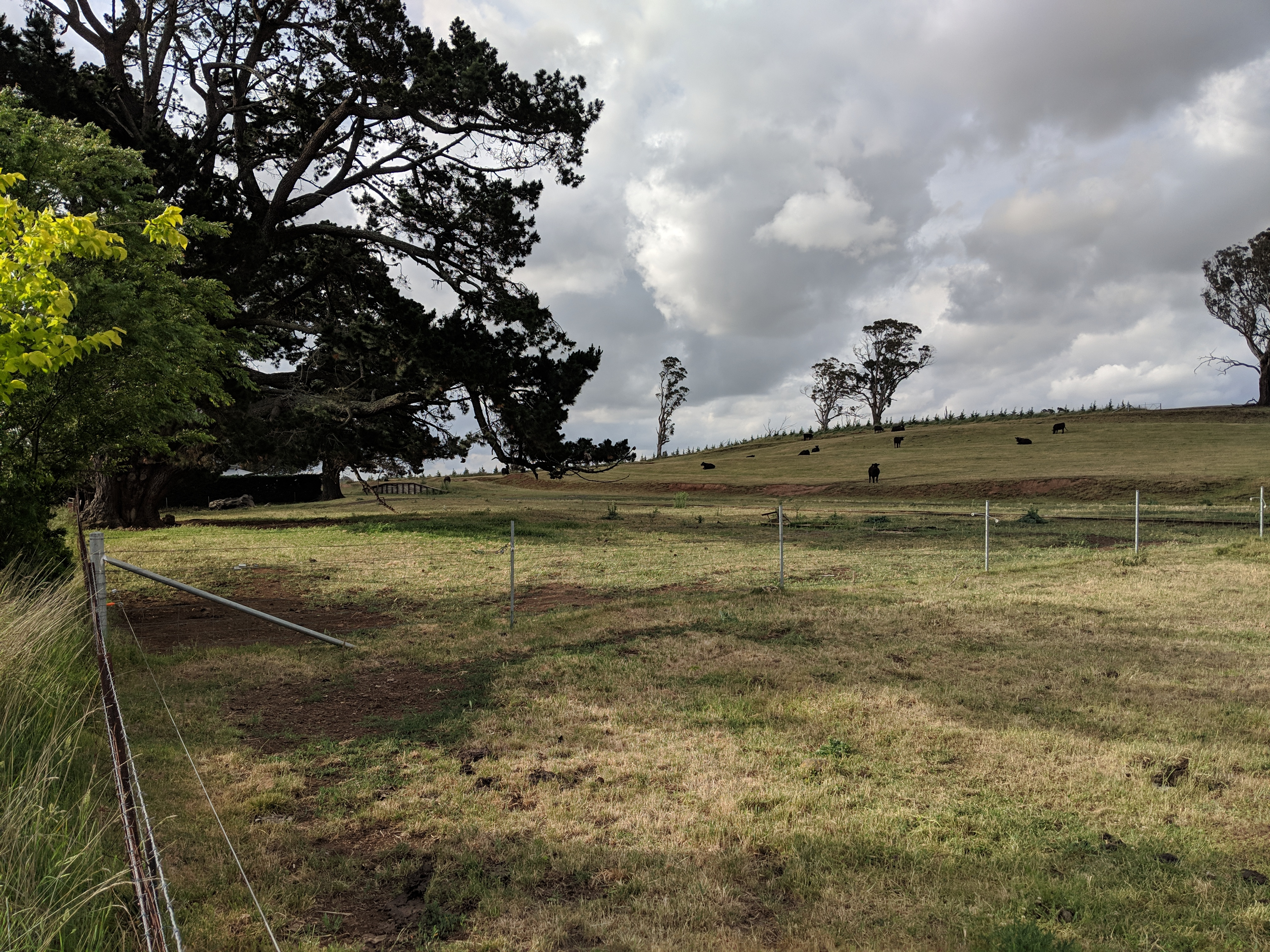
- Abandoned railway at Roslyn

- Coordinates: 34°29′37″S 149°36′02″E
- Country: Australia
- State: New South Wales
- Region: Southern Tablelands
- LGA: Upper Lachlan Shire
- Location: 20 km (12 mi) E of Crookwell; 37 km (23 mi) N of Goulburn; 132 km (82 mi) NE of Canberra; 230 km (140 mi) SW of Sydney

Government
  - State electorate: Goulburn
  - Federal division: Riverina
- Elevation: 931 m (3,054 ft)

Population
  - Total: 95 (SAL 2021)
- Postcode: 2580
- County: Argyle
- Parish: Upper Tarlo
Localities around Roslyn
| Laggan | Laggan | Chatsbury |
| Crookwell | Roslyn | Middle Arm |
| Pejar | Woodhouselee | Middle Arm |

Roslyn is a locality in the Upper Lachlan Shire, New South Wales, Australia. It lies about 20 km east of Crookwell and 37 km north of Goulburn. At the 2016 census, it had a population of 92. Roslyn railway station was a junction station on the now disused Crookwell railway line from 1902 to 1974 and the disused Taralga railway line from 1926 to 1957.
