= Parish of Tarago =

Coordinates: 34°54′S 149°32′E

Tarago Parish New South Wales
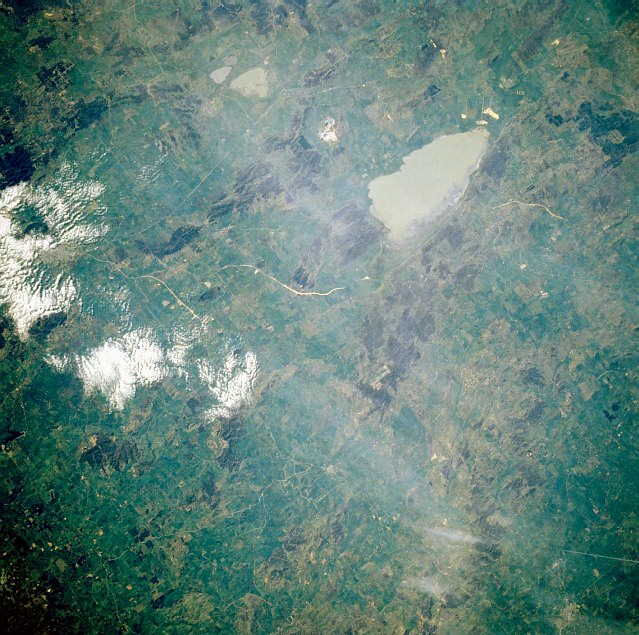
- Tarago Parish from Space Shuttle 2005.
- LGA(s): Goulburn Mulwaree
- County: Argyle
- Division: Eastern
Lands administrative divisions around Tarago Parish:
Milbang	Wologorong	Wologorong
Collector	Tarago Parish	Mangamore
Collector	Currowang	Willeroo

The Parish of Tarago is a parish of Argyle County. It does not actually contain the town of Tarago, which is located further to the southeast in the Parish of Mulwaree. The Parish was established by the Department of Lands in New South Wales.

The Federal Highway passes through the Parish of Tarago to the north of Rowes Lagoon. Currawang Road is another major road in the area.

The Tarago area was first inhabited by the Gundungurra people. In the mid-1840s, the NSW colonial government granted numerous land grants in the area, marking the beginning of white settlement on this land.
