= Kingsdale, New South Wales =

Kingsdale
- Town
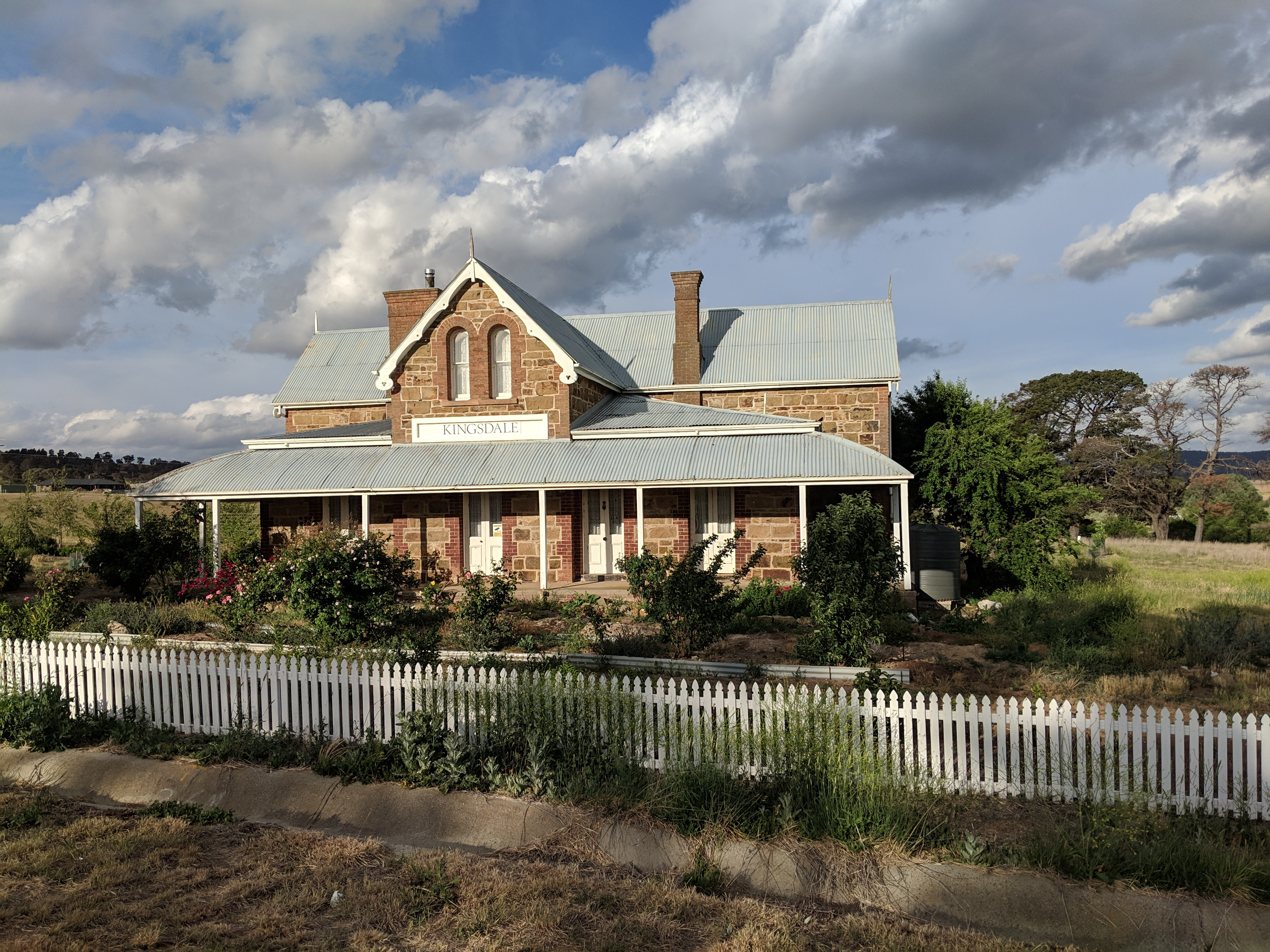

- Coordinates: 34°41′57″S 149°42′02″E
- Country: Australia
- State: New South Wales
- Region: Southern Tablelands
- LGA: Goulburn Mulwaree Council
- Location: 95 km (59 mi) NE of Canberra; 7 km (4.3 mi) N of Goulburn; 202 km (126 mi) SW of Sydney

Government
  - State electorate: Goulburn
  - Federal division: Eden-Monaro
- Elevation: 659 m (2,162 ft)

Population
  - Total: 211 (SAL 2021)
- Postcode: 2580
- County: Argyle
- Parish: Narrangarril
Localities around Kingsdale
Woodhouselee	Middle Arm	Middle Arm
Wayo	Kingsdale	Middle Arm
Baw Baw	Goulburn	Goulburn

Kingsdale is a locality in the Goulburn Mulwaree Council, New South Wales, Australia. It lies about 7 km north of Goulburn and 95 km northeast of Canberra. At the 2016 census, it had a population of 175.

Kingsdale had a state public school from 1885 to 1948. This was described as a "public school" (1885–1899 and 1901–1829), "provisional school" (1929–1948) or "half-time school" (1899–1901 and 1929).
