= Baw Baw =

Baw Baw may refer to:

Places in Australia:

- Baw Baw, New South Wales
  - Parish of Baw Baw
- Baw Baw in Victoria:
  - Baw Baw National Park
    - Baw Baw Plateau in the Park
  - Mount Baw Baw
  - Shire of Baw Baw

== See also ==
- Baw Baw frog, a critically endangered frog, which lives on the Baw Baw Plateau.
- Baw Baw berry, Wittsteinia vacciniacea, a plant species
