= Parish of Wologorong =

Coordinates: 34°50′S 149°33′E

Wologorong Parish
- Cadastral division
- Country: Australia
- State: New South Wales
- LGA: Goulburn Mulwaree
- County: Argyle
- Division: Eastern
Lands administrative divisions around Wologorong Parish
Milbang	Bredalbane	Goulburn
Milbang	Wologorong Parish	Terranna
Milbang	Tarago h	Mangamore

The Parish of Wologorong is a parish of Argyle County, New South Wales, Australia.

Both the Federal Highway and the Hume Highway, pass through the parish, with their intersection just outside the north east corner of the parish south of Goulburn. A significant natural feature of the parish is the Wollogorang Lagoon (spelled differently from the parish name). Wollogorang Road and Thornford Road are other roads in the area. The locality of Wollogorang is partly located in Wologorong Parish and partly in Tarago Parish.

== History ==
The Wollogorang area was first inhabited by the Gundungurra people, and by the mid-1840s the NSW colonial government had granted numerous land grants in area, beginning white settlement.
