= Mummel =

- Town
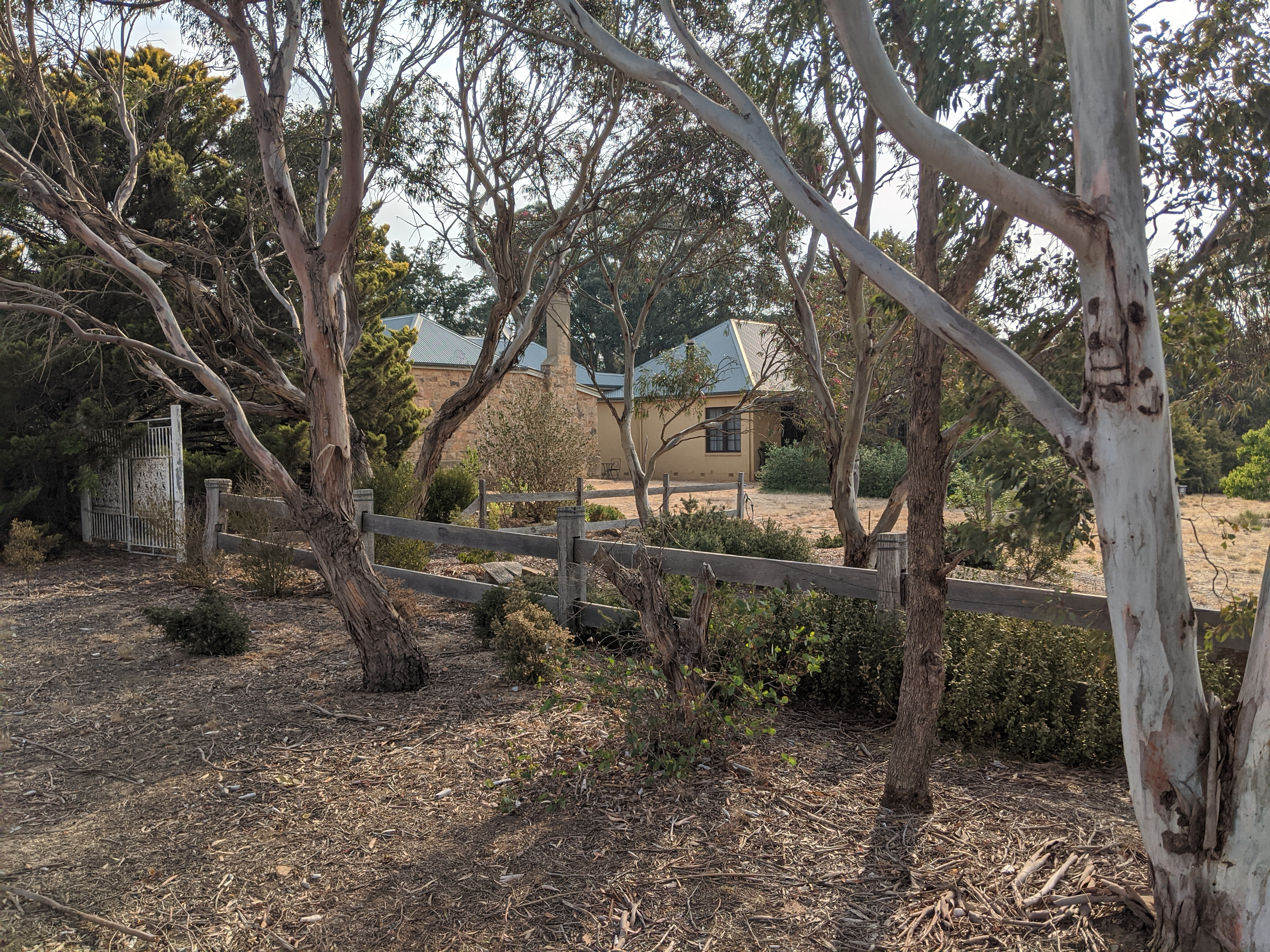

- Coordinates: 34°40′54″S 149°35′04″E
- Country: Australia
- State: New South Wales
- Region: Southern Tablelands
- LGA: Goulburn Mulwaree Council
- Location: 110 km (68 mi) NE of Canberra; 28 km (17 mi) SSE of Crookwell; 23 km (14 mi) NW of Goulburn; 216 km (134 mi) SW of Sydney

Government
  - State electorate: Goulburn
  - Federal division: Eden-Monaro
- Elevation: 685 m (2,247 ft)

Population
  - Total: 129 (2021 census)
- Postcode: 2580
- County: Argyle
- Parish: Mummel
Localities around Mummel
Bannister	Wayo	Wayo
Bannister	Mummel	Baw Baw
Pomeroy	Pomeroy	Baw Baw

Mummel is a locality in the Goulburn Mulwaree Council, New South Wales, Australia. It lies about 23 km northwest of Goulburn and 110 km northeast of Canberra. At the 2021 census, it had a population of 129.

Various state schools were located in or near Mummel between 1868 and 1959. One school was established as Mummell Provisional School in October 1868, but was renamed Pomeroy school in January 1876. It was closed in 1915. An apparently different school called Mummell Public School was established in January 1870, but changed its name to Merrilla Public School also in January 1876. It closed in September 1927. Mummell (east) or Mummell East school was established in May 1870 and closed in December 1936. Mummell Lower school was established in January 1938 and closed in March 1959.
