= Baw Baw, New South Wales =

Baw Baw
- Town
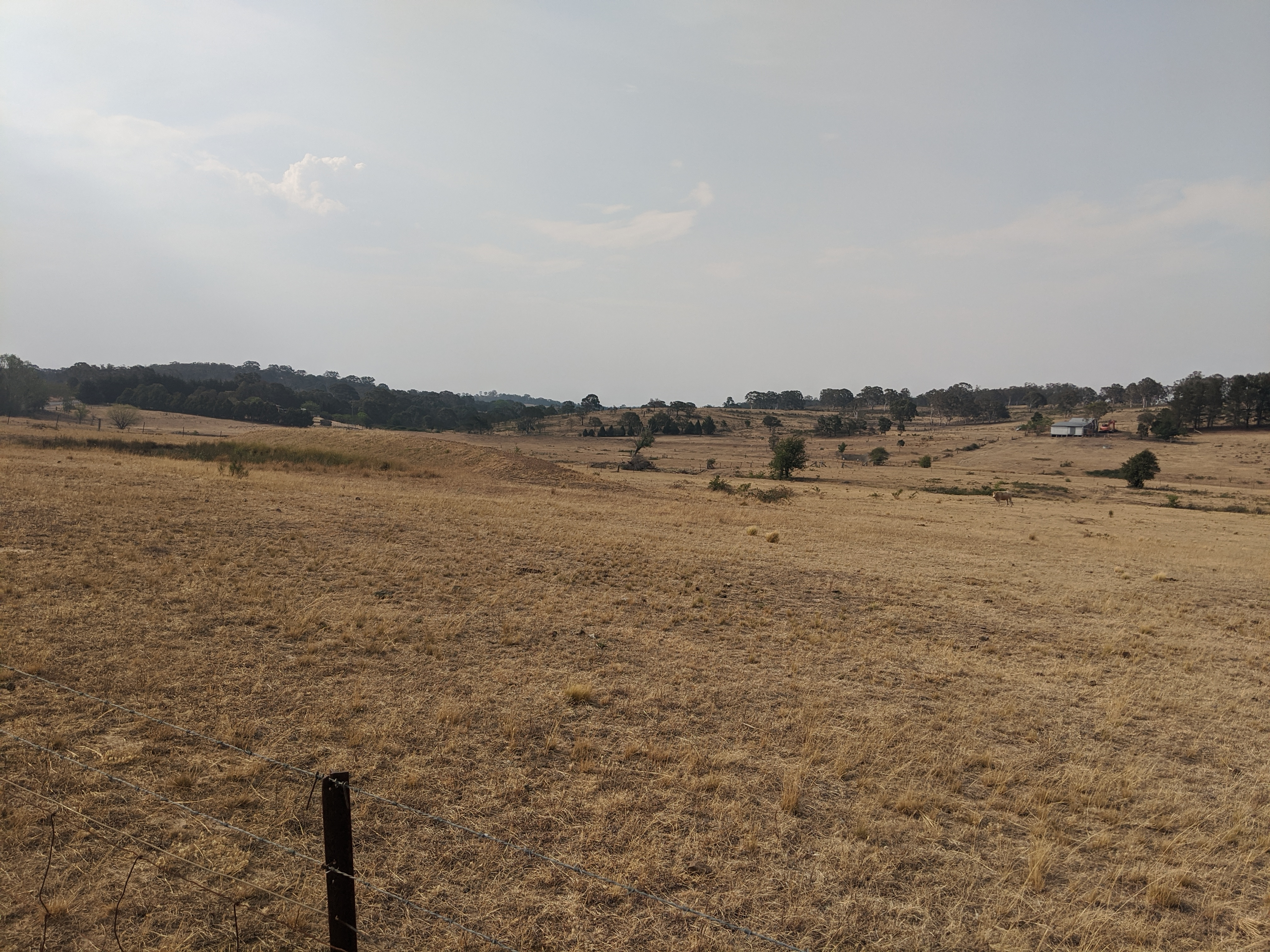

- Coordinates: 34°42′32″S 149°38′0″E
- Country: Australia
- State: New South Wales
- Region: Southern Tablelands
- LGA: Goulburn Mulwaree Council
- Location: 100 km (62 mi) NE of Canberra; 12 km (7.5 mi) NW of Goulburn; 206 km (128 mi) SW of Sydney

Government
  - State electorate: Goulburn
  - Federal division: Eden-Monaro
- Elevation: 674 m (2,211 ft)

Population
  - Total: 271 (SAL 2021)
- Postcode: 2580
- County: Argyle
- Parish: Baw Baw
Localities around Baw Baw
Mummel	Wayo	Kingsdale
Pomeroy	Baw Baw	Goulburn
Parkesbourne	Yarra	Run-O-Waters

Baw Baw is a locality in the Goulburn Mulwaree Council, New South Wales, Australia. It lies about 7 km north of Goulburn and 95 km northeast of Canberra. At the 2016 census, it had a population of 260.

Baw Baw had a state public school from November 1879 to May 1941, except in 1937. This was described as a "public school" until October 1929, when it became a "half-time school".
