= Middle Arm, New South Wales =

Middle Arm
- Town
- Coordinates: 34°35′51″S 149°43′40″E
- Country: Australia
- State: New South Wales
- Region: Southern Tablelands
- LGA: Upper Lachlan Shire
- Location: 16 km (9.9 mi) N of Goulburn; 81 km (50 mi) WSW of Moss Vale; 42 km (26 mi) ESE of Crookwell; 209 km (130 mi) SW of Sydney

Government
  - State electorate: Goulburn
  - Federal division: Riverina
- Elevation: 755 m (2,477 ft)

Population
  - Total: 377 (2021 census)
- Postcode: 2580
- County: Argyle
- Parish: Wayo
Localities around Middle Arm
Roslyn	Myrtleville	Chatsbury
Woodhouselee	Middle Arm	Tarlo
Wayo	Kingsdale	Goulburn

Middle Arm is a locality in the Upper Lachlan Shire, in the Southern Tablelands region of New South Wales, Australia. At the 2021 census, it had a population of 377.

== Demographics ==
As of the 2021 Australian census, 377 people resided in Middle Arm, up from 362 in the 2016 census. The median age of persons in Middle Arm was 46 years. There were more males than females, with 53.5% of the population male and 46.5% female. The average household size was 2.7 people per household.
