= Parish of Collector =

Coordinates: 34°56′S 149°26′E

Collector Parish New South Wales
- LGA(s): Goulburn Mulwaree
- County: Argyle
- Division: Eastern
Lands administrative divisions around Collector Parish:
| Milbang | Milbang | Tarago |
| Lerida | Collector Parish | Currowang |
| Gundaroo | Lake George (Murray) | Lake George (Murray) |

The Parish of Collector is a parish of Argyle County located to the north of Lake George.

It contains the town of Collector. The Federal Highway runs through the parish from south-west to north-east.
