= Wayo, New South Wales =

Wayo
- Town
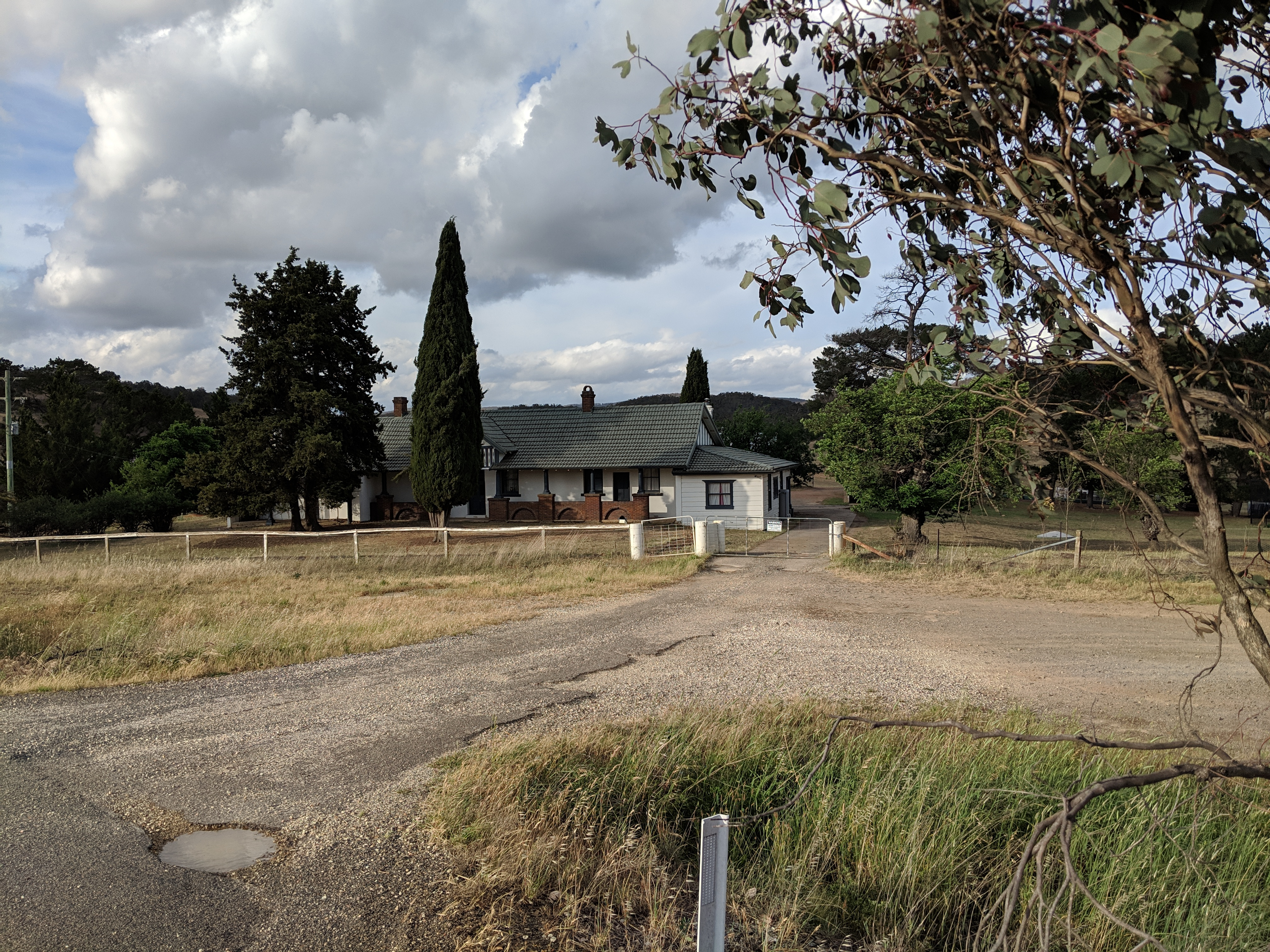

- Coordinates: 34°36′06″S 149°37′04″E
- Country: Australia
- State: New South Wales
- Region: Southern Tablelands
- LGAs: Upper Lachlan Shire; Goulburn Mulwaree Council
- Location: 110 km (68 mi) NE of Canberra; 20 km (12 mi) NW of Goulburn; 26 km (16 mi) SE of Crookwell; 213 km (132 mi) SW of Sydney

Government
  - State electorate: Goulburn
  - Federal division: Riverina
- Elevation: 814 m (2,671 ft)

Population
  - Total: 125 (SAL 2021)
- Postcode: 2580
- County: Argyle
- Parish: Wayo
Localities around Wayo
Pejar	Woodhouselee	Middle Arm
Bannister	Wayo	Kingsdale
Mummel	Baw Baw	Kingsdale

Wayo is a locality mainly in the Upper Lachlan Shire, New South Wales, Australia. Part of it is in Goulburn Mulwaree Council. It lies about 20 km northwest of Goulburn and 110 km northeast of Canberra. At the 2016 census, it had a population of 119.
