= Tarlo, New South Wales =

Tarlo
- Town
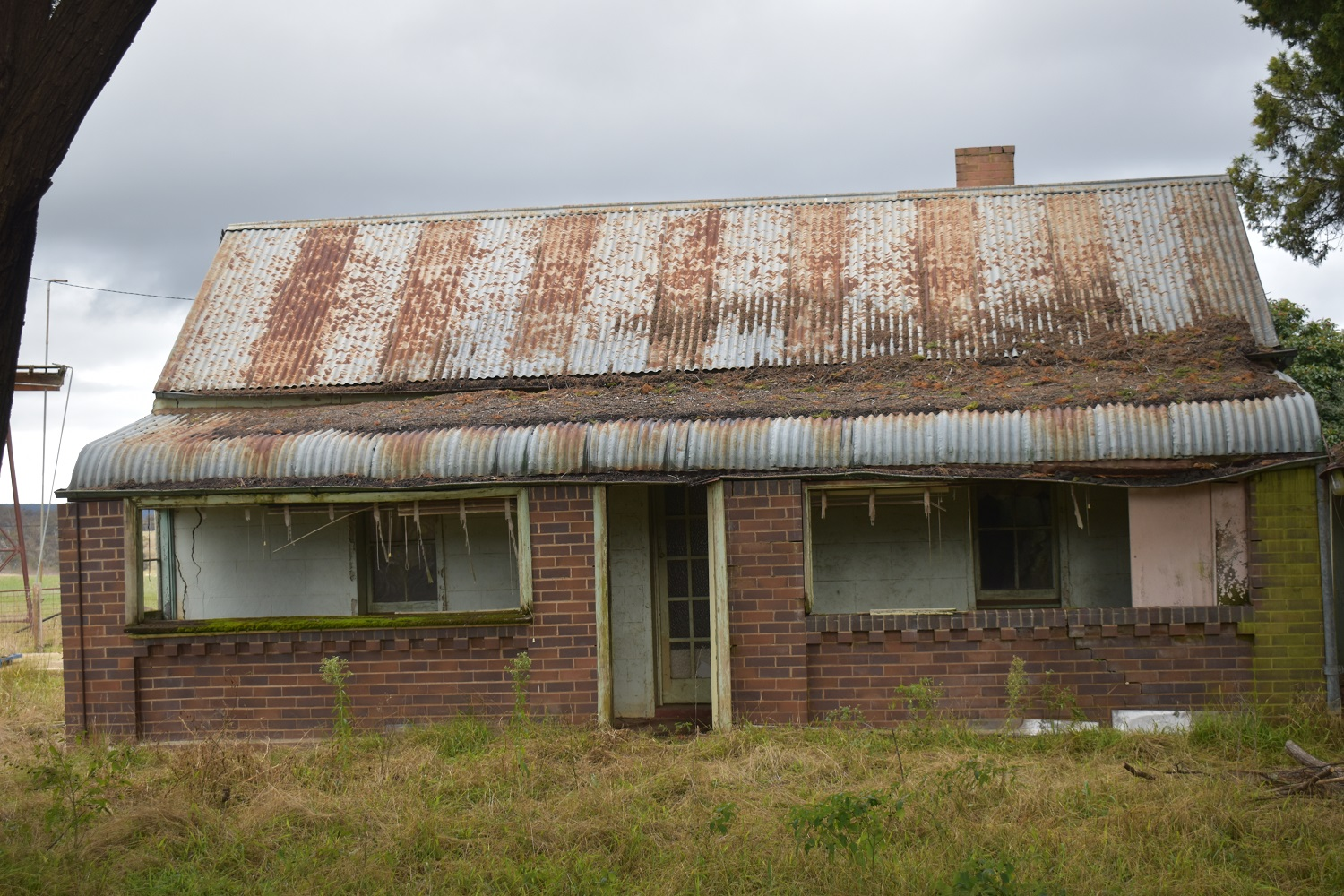
- Original Riverview Cottage At Tarlo

- Coordinates: 34°35′57″S 149°48′02″E
- Country: Australia
- State: New South Wales
- LGAs: Upper Lachlan Shire; Goulburn Mulwaree Council
- Location: 17 km (11 mi) N of Goulburn; 106 km (66 mi) NE of Canberra; 28 km (17 mi) S of Taralga; 127 km (79 mi) S of Oberon; 209 km (130 mi) SW of Sydney

Government
  - State electorate: Goulburn
  - Federal division: Hume
- Elevation: 721 m (2,365 ft)

Population
  - Total: 164 (2016 census)
- Postcode: 2580
- County: Argyle
- Parish: Rhyana; Narrangarril
Localities around Tarlo
Middle Arm	Chatsbury	Greenwich Park
Middle Arm	Tarlo	Greenwich Park
Goulburn	Goulburn	Towrang

Tarlo is a locality in the Southern Tablelands of New South Wales, Australia in both Goulburn City and Upper Lachlan Shire. It is extends from the outskirts of Goulburn to the Tarlo River south of the township of Taralga. At the 2016 census, it had a population of 164.

The Tarlo River, which flows north to Sydney, is the only significant water source in the area and has provided the locals of all species - plant, animal and human - a vital lifeblood for centuries This has created a rich ecosystem and farmlands nestled at the foot of Tarlo Hill .

First proclaimed in 1885, Tarlo was once a thriving little village by the river. The area is now a rural oasis dominated by farmland and bushland providing a scenic backdrop on the drive to Taralga, Wombeyan Caves, Crookwell, or Goulburn.

Over the years many families have run small farms in the area with cows and sheep still very prevalent across the landscape. Gone though is the original piggery at Riverview once a dominant feature on the landscape by the river. Visitors today can walk the grounds and view the displays to capture a sense of the rugged lifestyle.

In 1974 Taralga Road was realigned to allow for a higher stronger bridge across the Tarlo River after a successful campaign by local to replace the old damaged bridge 400m to the south. The footings of the old bridge, built in 1908, still stand today overlooking the river used now only for picnics and fishing.

The area still features a number of original buildings such as the old Anglican Church, now restored. As does the original Riverview cottage on the hill overlooking the river. As the first house on the road up from the river it used to provide refuge for weary travelers caught unawares by heavy rain as they made the way up from the often flooded Tarlo River crossing. As it does today a bridge is the only way to cross the river on this side of Goulburn providing a vital link to Taralga and the north. Many people with cars, horses and other animals used to get caught when the waters would suddenly rise.

== Activities ==
Camping: Camping is popular during the warmer months from September to April particularly by the Tarlo River. There are limited public free camping spots available as most of Taralga Road is bounded by private property, but some landholders do allow free camping, such as at the Tarlo River Campgrounds.
