= Parkesbourne =

- Town
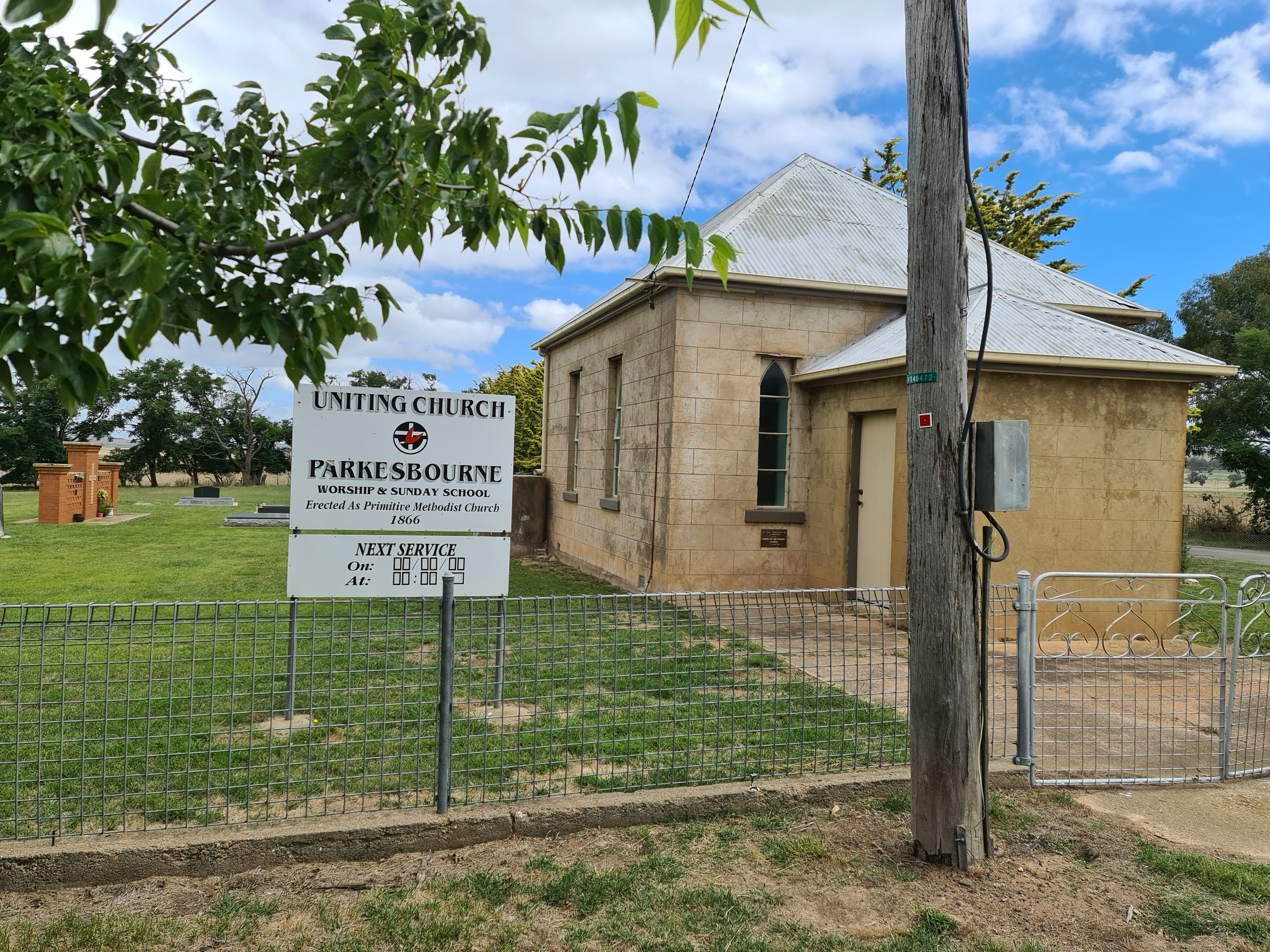
- Parkesbourne Church

- Coordinates: 34°44′54″S 149°32′04″E
- Country: Australia
- State: New South Wales
- Region: Southern Tablelands
- LGA: Goulburn Mulwaree Council
- Location: 90 km (56 mi) NE of Canberra; 20 km (12 mi) W of Goulburn; 218 km (135 mi) SW of Sydney

Government
  - State electorate: Goulburn
  - Federal division: Eden-Monaro
- Elevation: 658 m (2,159 ft)

Population
  - Total: 152 (SAL 2021)
- Postcode: 2580
- County: Argyle
- Parish: Breadalbane
Localities around Parkesbourne
| Gurrundah | Pomeroy | Baw Baw |
| Breadalbane | Parkesbourne | Yarra |
| Breadalbane | Wollogorang | Yarra |

Parkesbourne is a locality in the Goulburn Mulwaree Council, New South Wales, Australia. The Hume Highway runs on its southern edge. It lies about 20 km west of Goulburn and 90 km northeast of Canberra. At the 2016 census, it had a population of 170.

Parkesbourne is said to have been originally called "Breadalbane Plains", but renamed by Henry Parkes after himself during a visit in the 1860s when he was "education minister" (most likely actually Colonial Secretary in 1866–68). Parkesbourne had a state school from May 1870 to April 1969. This was described as a "public school" from April 1872. Earlier it was described as "half-time school" or "provisional school".
