= Tarlo River =

Coordinates: 34°31′S 149°53′E

Tarlo Middle Arm Creek, Upper Tarlo Creek, Tarlo Creek, Cookbundoon River

Location
- Country: Australia
- State: New South Wales
- Region: Sydney Basin (IBRA), Southern Tablelands
- District: Southern Highlands
- Local government areas: Upper Lachlan, Wollondilly

Physical characteristics
- Source: Great Dividing Range
  - location: Middle Arm east of Crookwell
  - elevation: 787 m (2,582 ft)
- Mouth: confluence with the Wollondilly River
  - location: Mount Penong, east of Taralga
  - elevation: 395 m (1,296 ft)
- Length: 92 km (57 mi)

Basin features
- River system: Hawkesbury-Nepean catchment
- Tributaries
  - left: Stony Creek (Wollondilly)
- National park: Tarlo River National Park

The Tarlo River, a perennial river that is part of the Hawkesbury-Nepean catchment, is located in the Southern Tablelands and Southern Highlands regions of New South Wales, Australia.

== Course and features ==
The Tarlo River rises within the Great Dividing Range, near the locality of Middle Arm east of Crookwell, and flows generally south southeast, north, and then east, joined by one minor tributary, before reaching its confluence with the Wollondilly River near Mount Penong, east of Taralga. The river descends 393 metres (1,289 ft) over its 92-kilometre (57 mi) course and it flows through Tarlo and then on to the Tarlo River National Park.

== Activities ==
Camping, fishing, swimming and other water activities are available at Tarlo River Campgrounds at The Shed @ Tarlo, Tarlo Village, via Taralga Rd Tarlo or Tarlo River National Park.

== See also ==
- List of rivers of New South Wales (L–Z)
- List of rivers of Australia
- Rivers of New South Wales
