= Parish of Currawang =

Currawang Parish
- Cadastral division
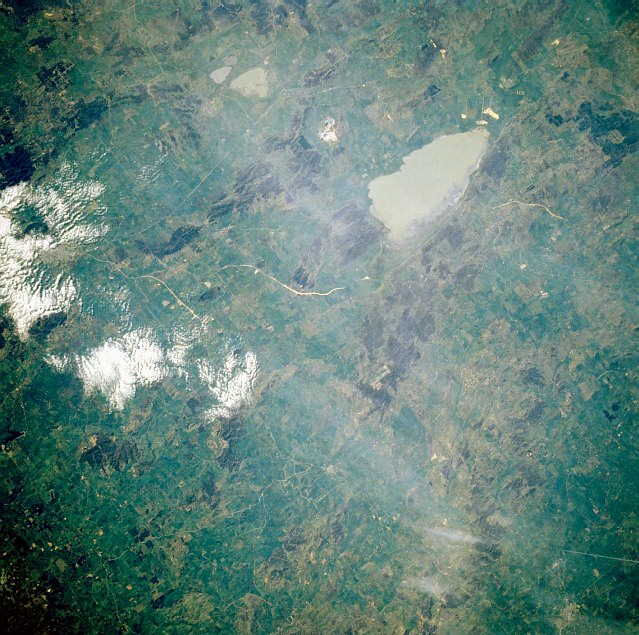
- Currawang area from space, November 1985

- Coordinates: 34°59′57″S 149°30′02″E
- Country: Australia
- State: New South Wales
- LGA: Goulburn Mulwaree
- County: Argyle
- Division: Eastern
Lands administrative divisions around Currawang Parish
Collector	Tarago	Willeroo
Collector	Currawang Parish	Willeroo
Lake George (Murray)	Lake George (Murray)	Werriwa (Murray)

The Parish of Currawang is a parish of Argyle County located to the north of Lake George. The parish was formerly known as the parish of Currowang, the former name discontinued on 14 November 1980 and the present name assigned.

The parish is roughly equivalent to the locality of Currawang.

== Images ==
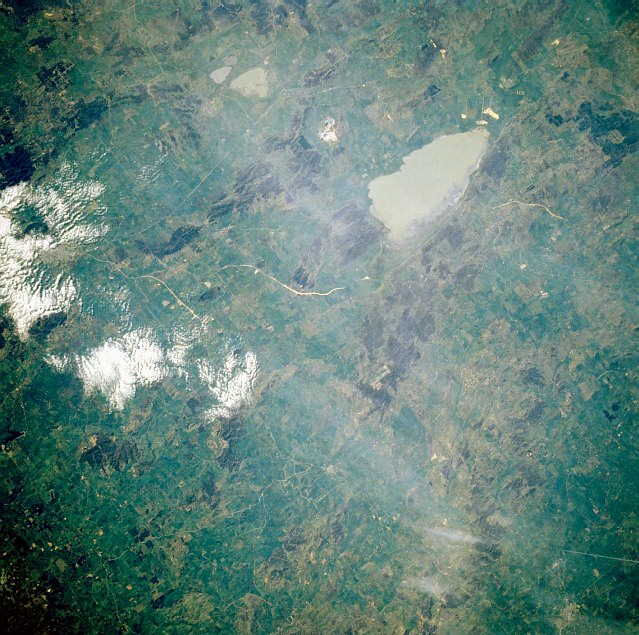
Lake George from space, November 1985

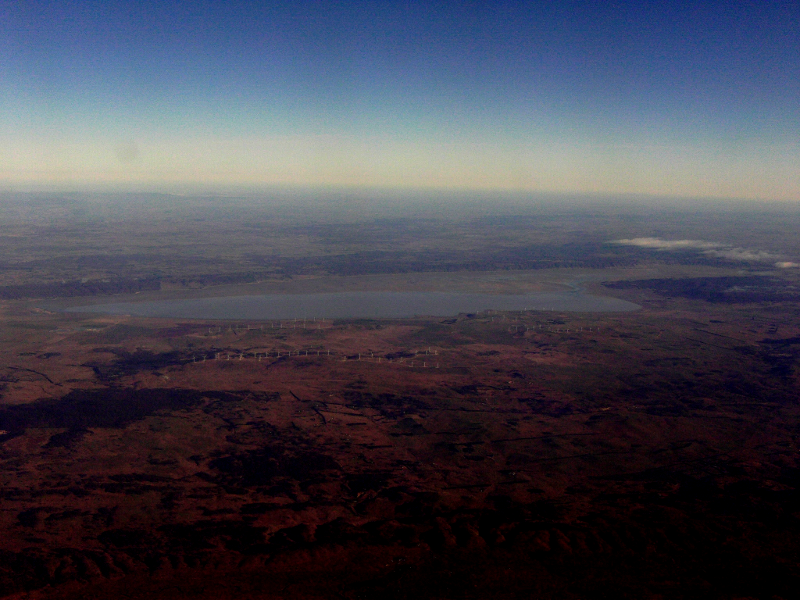
August 2010, aerial view looking northwest over the wind farm.

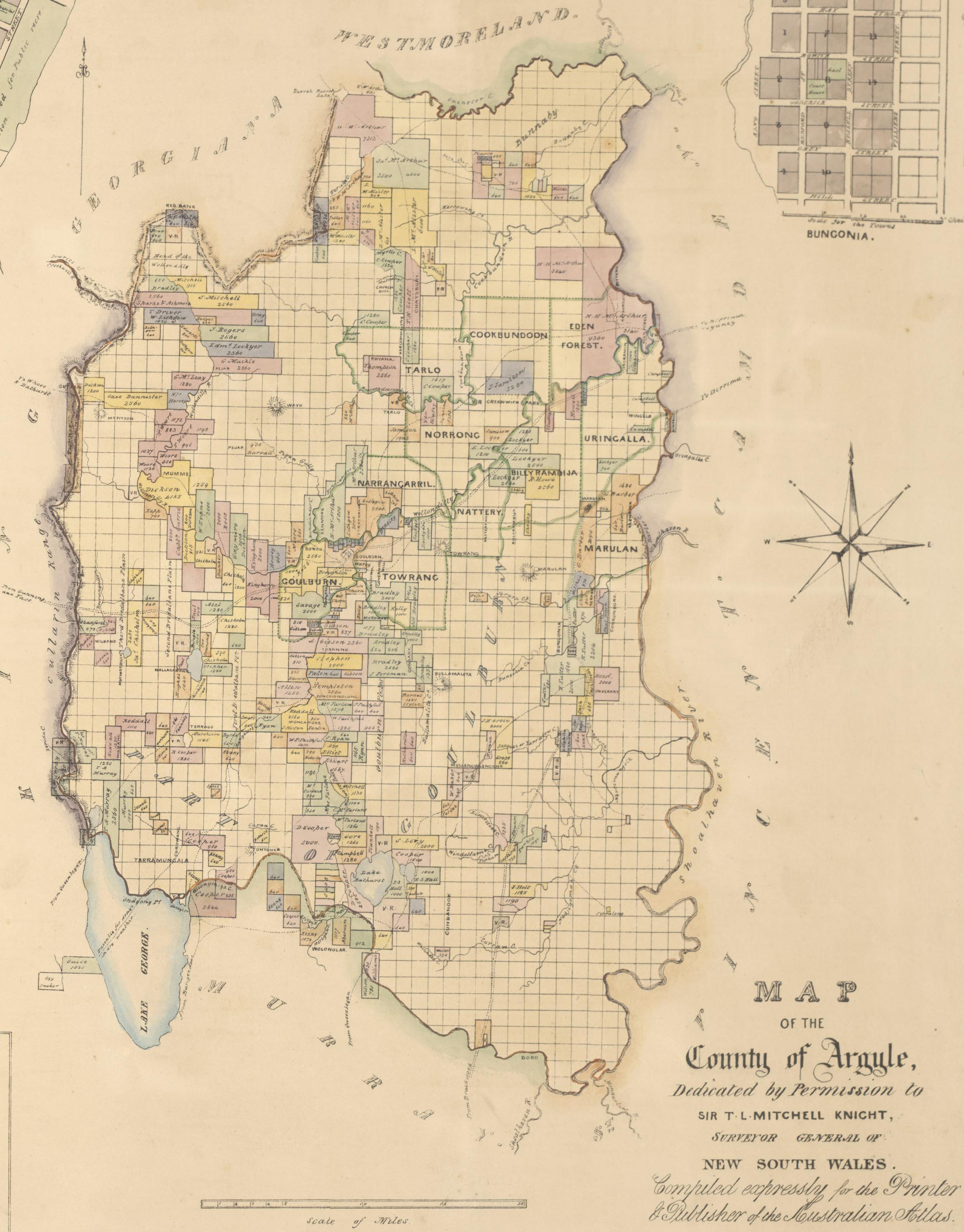
1840s map of the County of Argyle

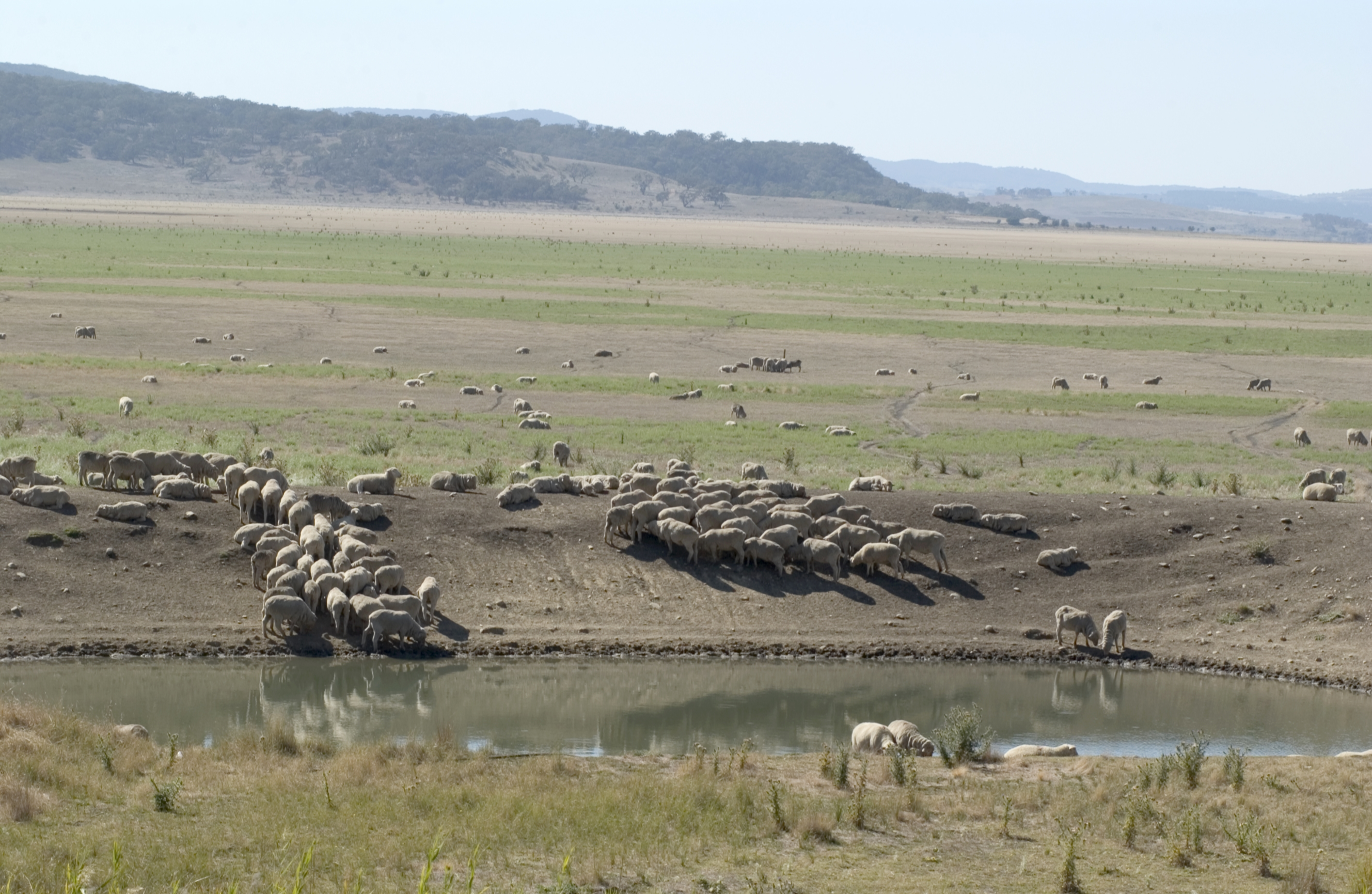
Currowang in the distance

== Notable residents ==
- Tom Frame (bishop)
