= Yalbraith, New South Wales =

Yalbraith
- Town
- Coordinates: 34°14′30″S 149°46′33″E
- Country: Australia
- State: New South Wales
- Region: Southern Tablelands
- LGA: Upper Lachlan Shire

Government
  - State electorate: Goulburn
  - Federal division: Riverina

Population
  - Total: 18 (SAL 2021)
- Postcode: 2580

Yalbraith is a locality in the Upper Lachlan Shire, in the Southern Tablelands region of New South Wales, Australia. At the 2021 census, it had a population of 18.

== Demographics ==
As of the 2021 Australian census, 18 people resided in Yalbraith, down from 19 in the 2016 census. The median age of persons in Yalbraith was 61 years. There were fewer males than females, with 17.6% of the population male and 82.4% female. The average household size was 2 people per household.
