= Woodhouselee, New South Wales =

Woodhouselee
- Town
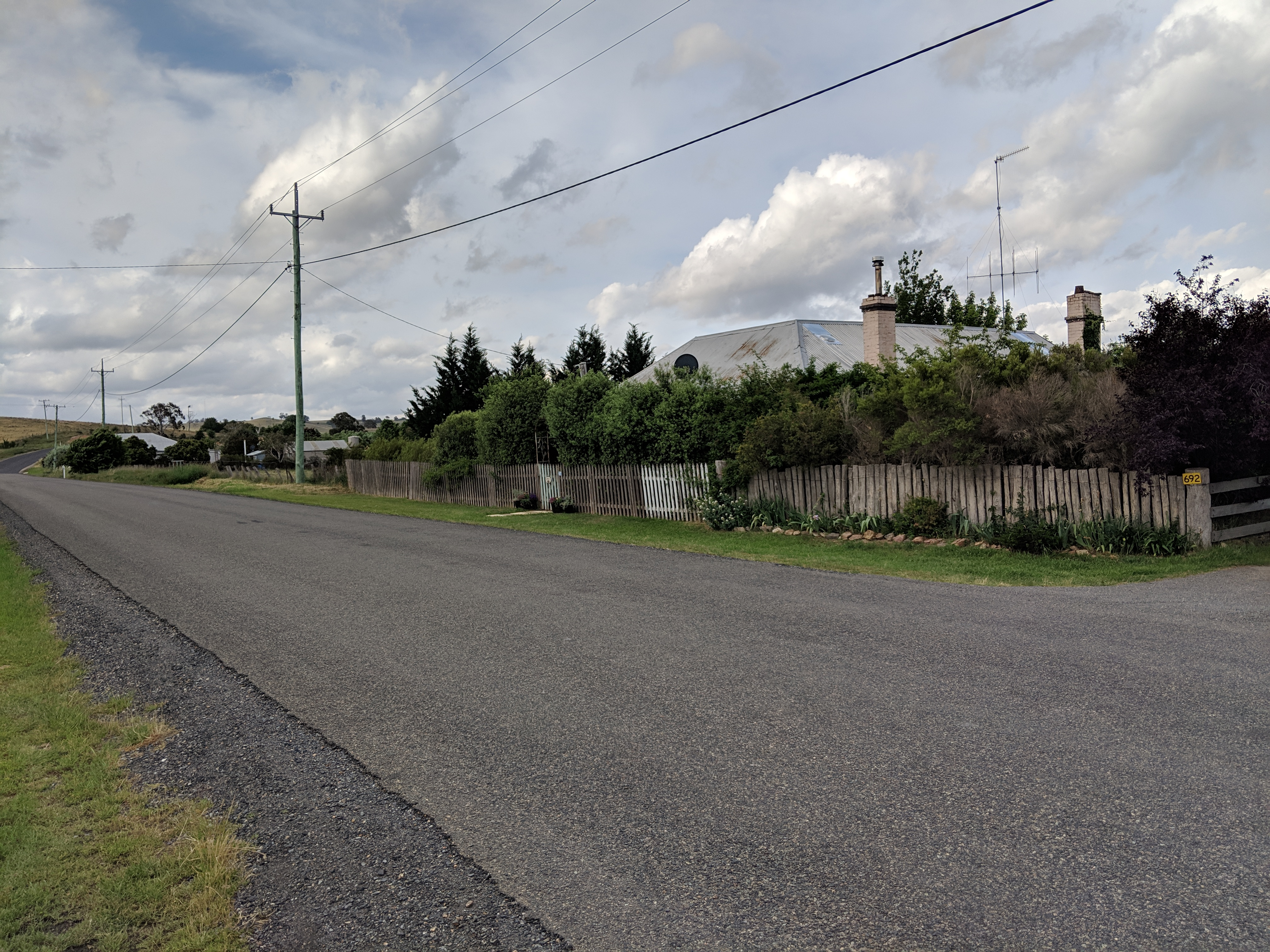
- Woodhouselee

- Coordinates: 34°33′57″S 149°38′02″E
- Country: Australia
- State: New South Wales
- Region: Southern Tablelands
- LGA: Upper Lachlan Shire
- Location: 115 km (71 mi) NE of Canberra; 25 km (16 mi) NW of Goulburn; 25 km (16 mi) SE of Crookwell; 220 km (140 mi) SW of Sydney

Government
  - State electorate: Goulburn
  - Federal division: Riverina
- Elevation: 808 m (2,651 ft)

Population
  - Total: 23 (SAL 2021)
- Postcode: 2580
- County: Argyle
- Parish: Wayo
Localities around Woodhouselee
Pejar	Roslyn	Middle Arm
Pejar	Woodhouselee	Middle Arm
Bannister	Wayo	Middle Arm

Woodhouselee is a locality in the Upper Lachlan Shire, New South Wales, Australia. It lies about 25 km northwest of Goulburn and 115 km northeast of Canberra. At the 2016 census, it had a population of 15.

Woodhouselee is said to have been named after an early settler called Woodhouse or to be a name given by William Lithgow to his "private township" after Woodhouselee, a small estate town south of Edinburgh, because of his early association as a student of the University of Edinburgh with the Tytler family.

Woodhouselee station was a station on the now disused Crookwell railway line from 1902 to 1975. Woodhouselee had a state public school from 1877 to 1893.
