= Bannister, New South Wales =

Bannister
- Town
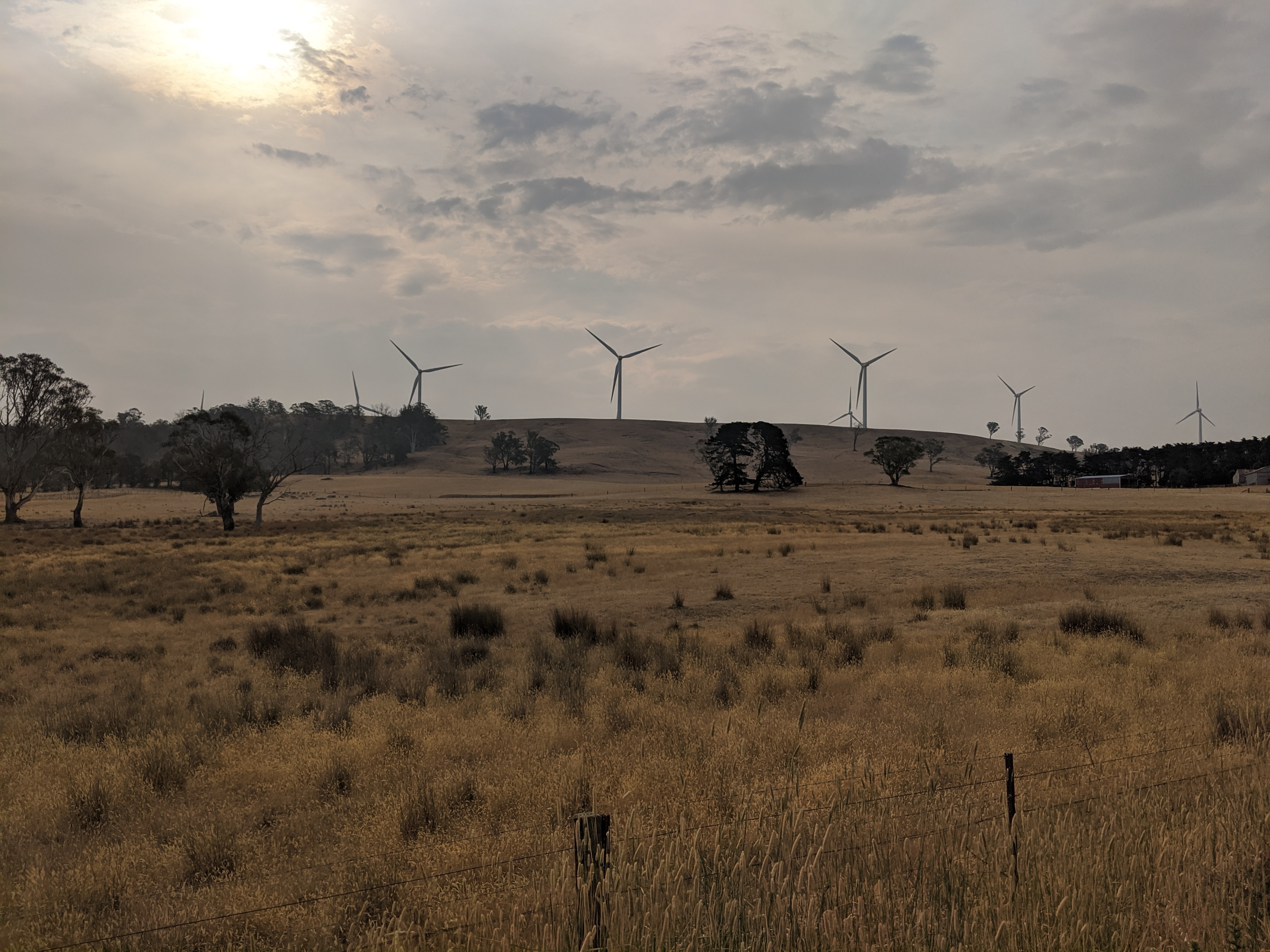
- Crookwell 2 Wind Farm from Bannister in 2019

- Coordinates: 34°35′54″S 149°29′34″E
- Country: Australia
- State: New South Wales
- Region: Southern Tablelands
- LGA: Upper Lachlan Shire
- Location: 120 km (75 mi) N of Canberra; 20 km (12 mi) S of Crookwell; 34 km (21 mi) NW of Goulburn; 229 km (142 mi) SW of Sydney

Government
  - State electorate: Goulburn
  - Federal division: Riverina
- Elevation: 897 m (2,943 ft)

Population
  - Total: 141 (SAL 2021)
- Postcode: 2580
- County: Argyle
- Parish: Pomeroy
Localities around Bannister
Grabben Gullen	Pejar	Woodhouselee
Gurrundah	Bannister	Wayo
Gurrundah	Gurrundah	Mummel

Bannister is a small locality in the Upper Lachlan Shire, New South Wales, Australia. It is situated approximately 20 km south of Crookwell and 90 km northeast of Canberra. According to the 2016 census, the population of Bannister was 120.

Bannister was named after Saxe Bannister, the first Attorney General of New South Wales. The locality had a state school from 1878 to 1968, which was referred to as a "public school", "half-time school" or "provisional school". Prior to May 1915, the school was known as Gullen Flat Public School.
