= Chatsbury, New South Wales =

Chatsbury
- Town
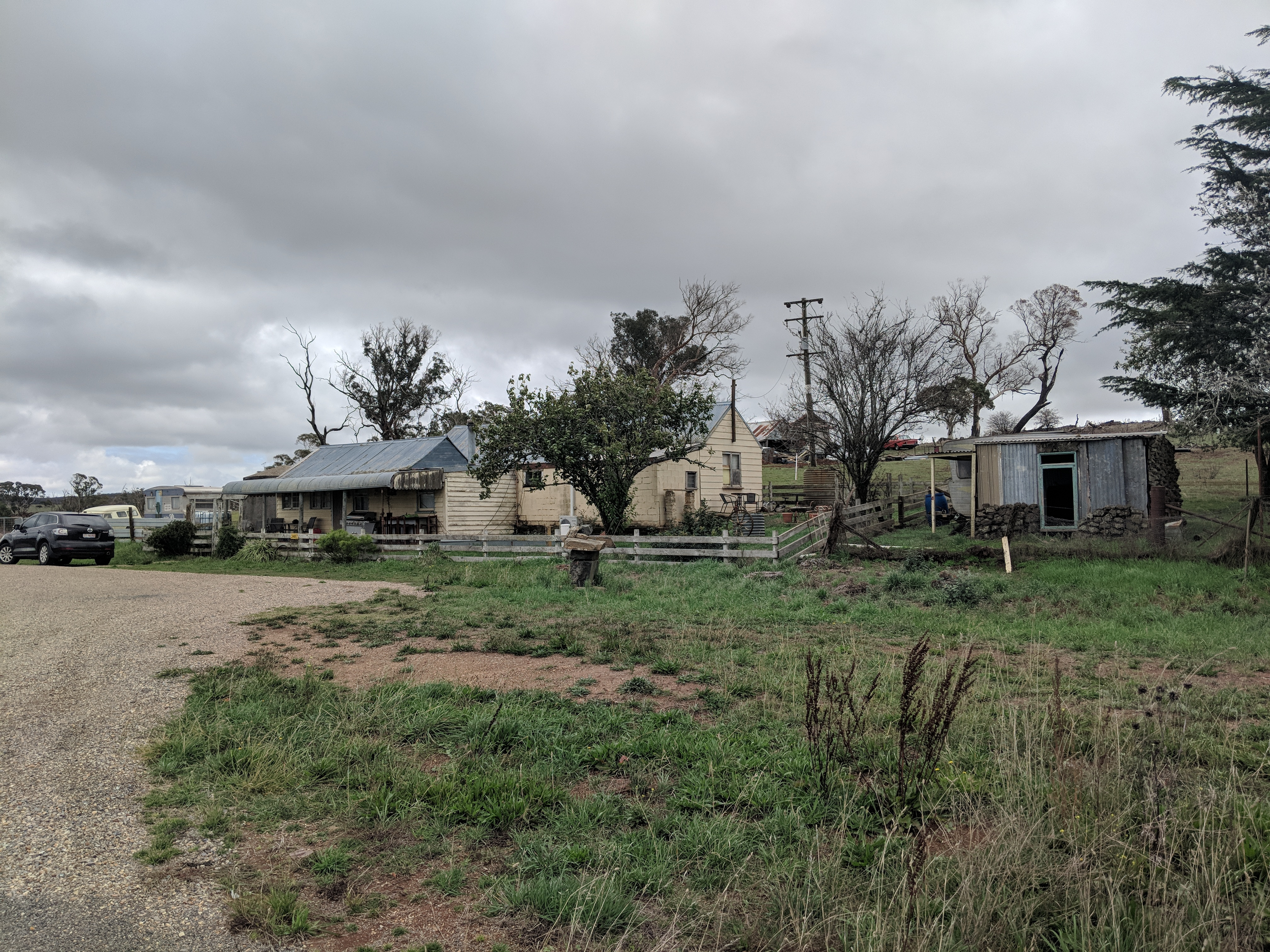

- Coordinates: 34°32′57″S 149°49′02″E
- Country: Australia
- State: New South Wales
- Region: Southern Tablelands
- LGA: Upper Lachlan Shire
- Location: 33 km (21 mi) N of Goulburn; 22 km (14 mi) S of Taralga; 124 km (77 mi) NE of Canberra; 221 km (137 mi) WSW of Sydney

Government
  - State electorate: Goulburn
  - Federal division: Riverina
- Elevation: 843 m (2,766 ft)

Population
  - Total: 86 (SAL 2021)
- Postcode: 2580
- County: Argyle
- Parish: Tarlo
Localities around Chatsbury
Middle Arm	Myrtleville
Middle Arm	Chatsbury	Greenwich Park
Middle Arm	Tarlo	Towrang

Chatsbury is a locality in the Upper Lachlan Shire, New South Wales, Australia. It lies about 33 km north of Goulburn and 22 km south of Taralga on the road from Goulburn to Oberon and Bathurst. At the 2016 census, it had a population of 91.
