= Parish of Terranna =

Terrana Parish New South Wales
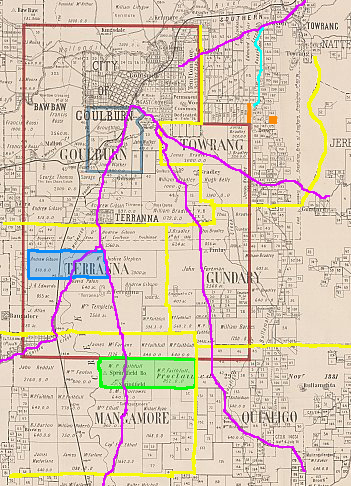
- Location of Terranna in 1900 outlined in yellow

- Coordinates: 34°51′57″S 149°40′02″E
- LGA(s): Goulburn Mulwaree
- County: Argyle
- Division: Eastern

The Parish of Terrana is a parish of Argyle County, New South Wales, Australia.

The area is similar to the locality of Tirrannaville, which partly lies in the Goulburn Parish.

== History ==
The area was first inhabited by the Gundungurra people, and by the mid 1840s the NSW colonial government had granted numerous land grants in area, beginning white settlement. A Public School was established in 1869. The area is today predominantly used for agriculture though it lies in the Sydney-Canberra transit corridor.
