= Tarlo River National Park =

National park in New South Wales, Australia

- Location within New South Wales
- Location: New South Wales
- Coordinates: 34°30′07″S 149°55′35″E
- Area: 80.74 km^{2} (31.17 sq mi)
- Established: 28 May 1982
- Governing body: National Parks and Wildlife Service (New South Wales)

Tarlo River is a national park located in New South Wales, Australia, 134 kilometres (83 mi) southwest of Sydney. Proclaimed in 1982, it contains a rugged, unusual landscape not found elsewhere in the region. Vehicular access is limited to a short stretch of Towrang Road that crosses its southern edge near the locality of Greenwich Park; the rest of the park is surrounded by private properties.

There is an exceptional Aboriginal cultural and historical heritage in this area.

== See also ==
- Protected areas of New South Wales
