= Parish of Mulwaree =

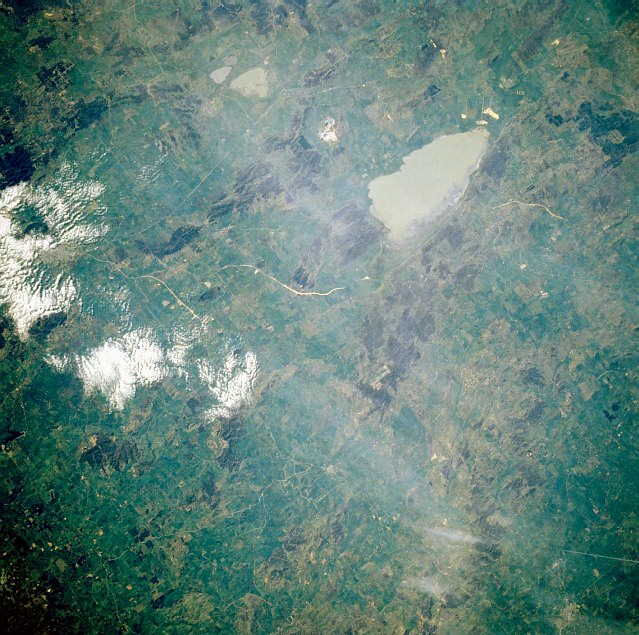
Mulwaree is centre of the picture.

The Parish of Mulwaree is a parish of Argyle County located on the western shore of Lake Bathurst, New South Wales, Australia.

== History ==
The area was traditional lands of the Ngunnawal people, but was also traversed by other tribes going to the coast or the Monaro during the bogong moth season. Stone artefacts dating back 20,000 years have been found at nearby Lake George.

The Lake Bathurst was discovered in April 1818 by an exploration commissioned by Governor Lachlan Macquarie to find a route from the inland to the settlement on the south coast at Jervis Bay that was headed by Surveyor General James Meehan. A village of Mulwaree was gazetted in the 19th century on the southern shore of Lake Bathurst, but failed to grow, moving 1½km to the west at the site of Tarago, on the main trainline.

== Geography ==
Significant features in the parish include:

- The Mulwaree River, a perennial river that is part of the Hawkesbury-Nepean catchment
- Lake Bathurst (New South Wales) on the northern boundary
- Townships of Tarago and Lake Bathurst

== Ecology ==
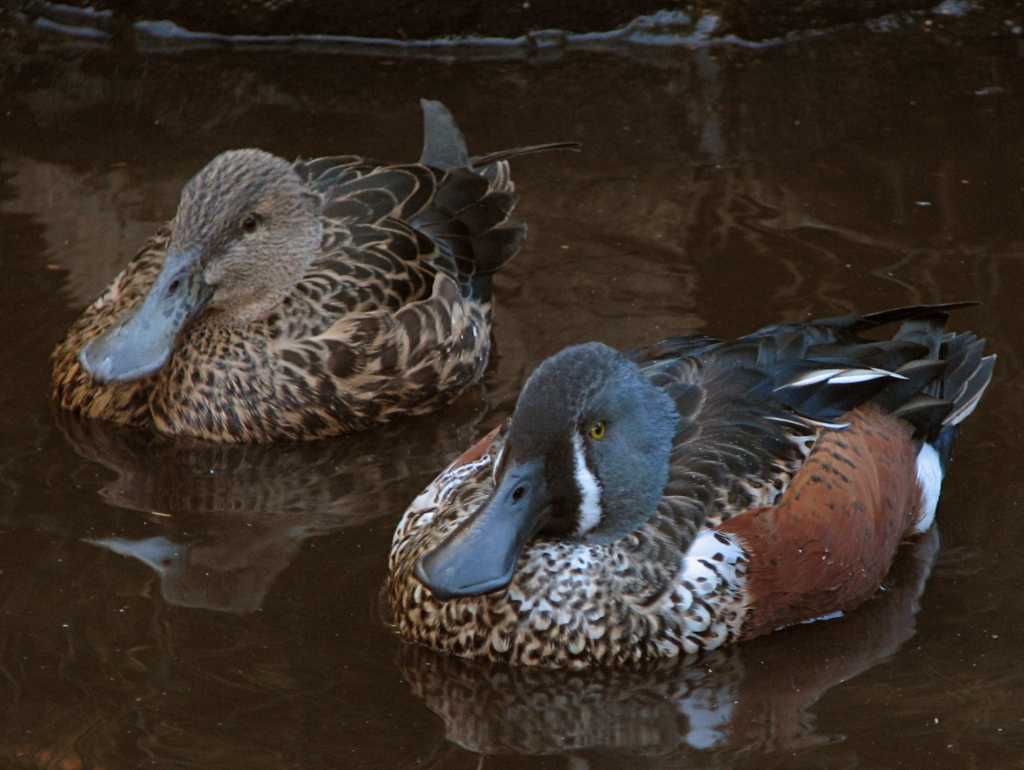
The lake is an important site for Australasian shovellers.

The area has been identified by BirdLife International as an Important Bird Area because it regularly supports significant numbers of:

- Blue-billed ducks
- Australasian shovellers
- Freckled ducks
- Black swans
- Chestnut teals
- Sharp-tailed sandpipers

== See also ==
- Lake Bathurst (New South Wales)

== Economy ==
The Parish is predominantly Agricultureal in its economic base, however, the economic base has diversified in recent years with:

- An intermodal transfer station on the main Sydney to Canberra railwayline
- The former Woodlawn Mine now a major waste facility for Sydney
- Woodlawn Wind Farm
- Woodlawn bioreactor

The parish has begun to be used as commuter zone for the nearby city of Canberra

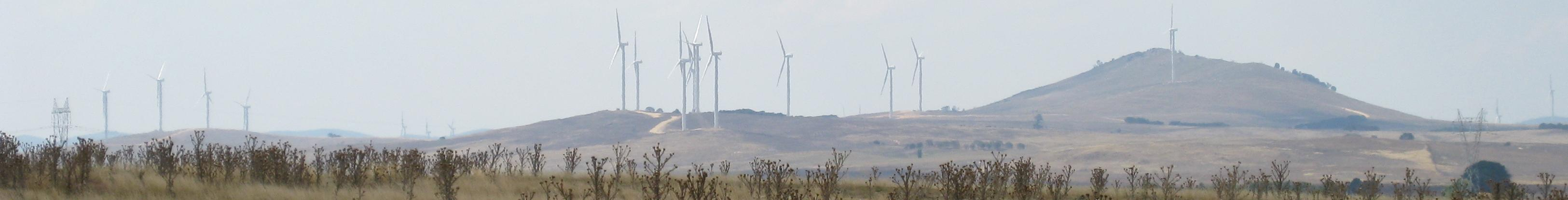
The Woodlawn Wind Farm

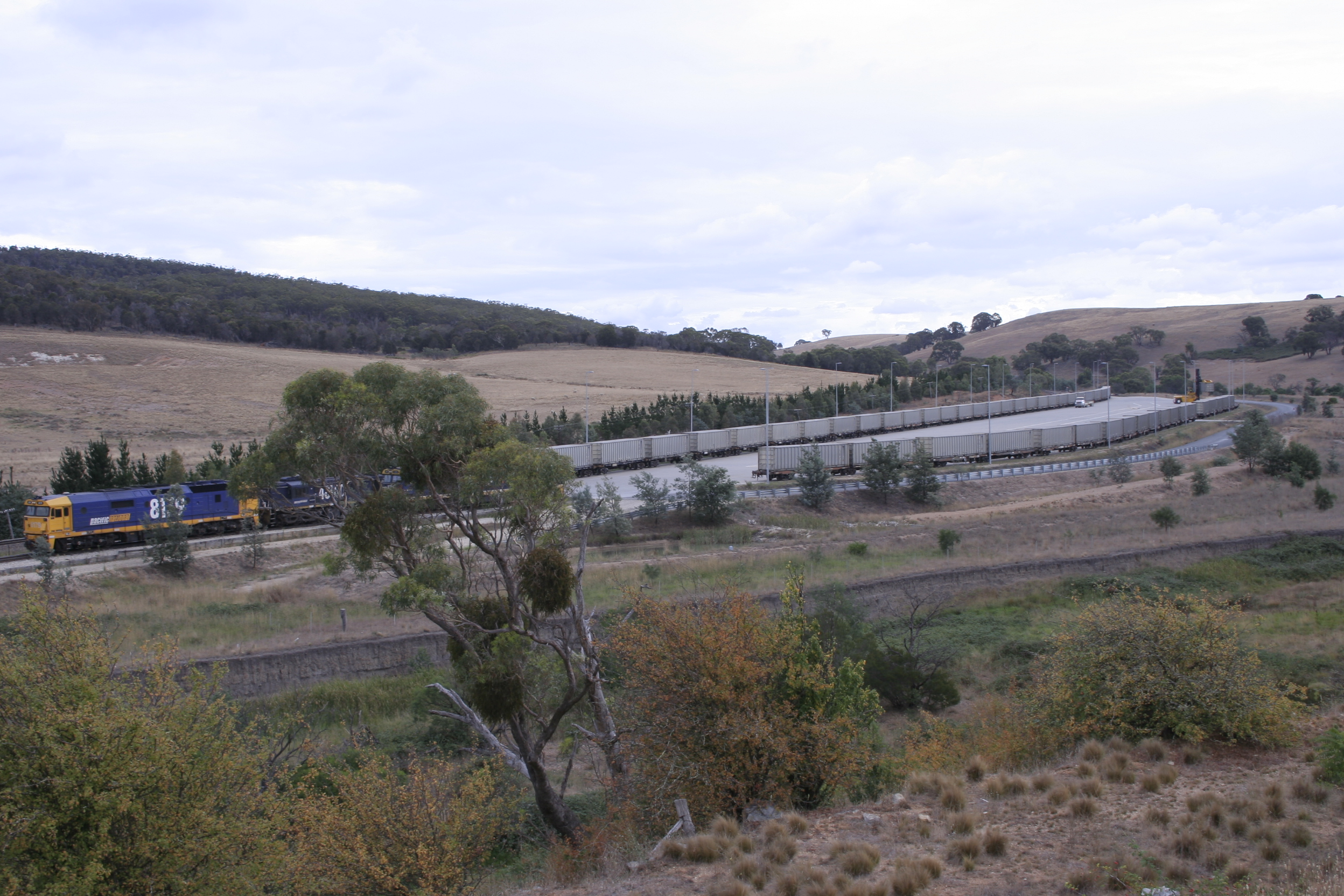
Intermodal transfer station

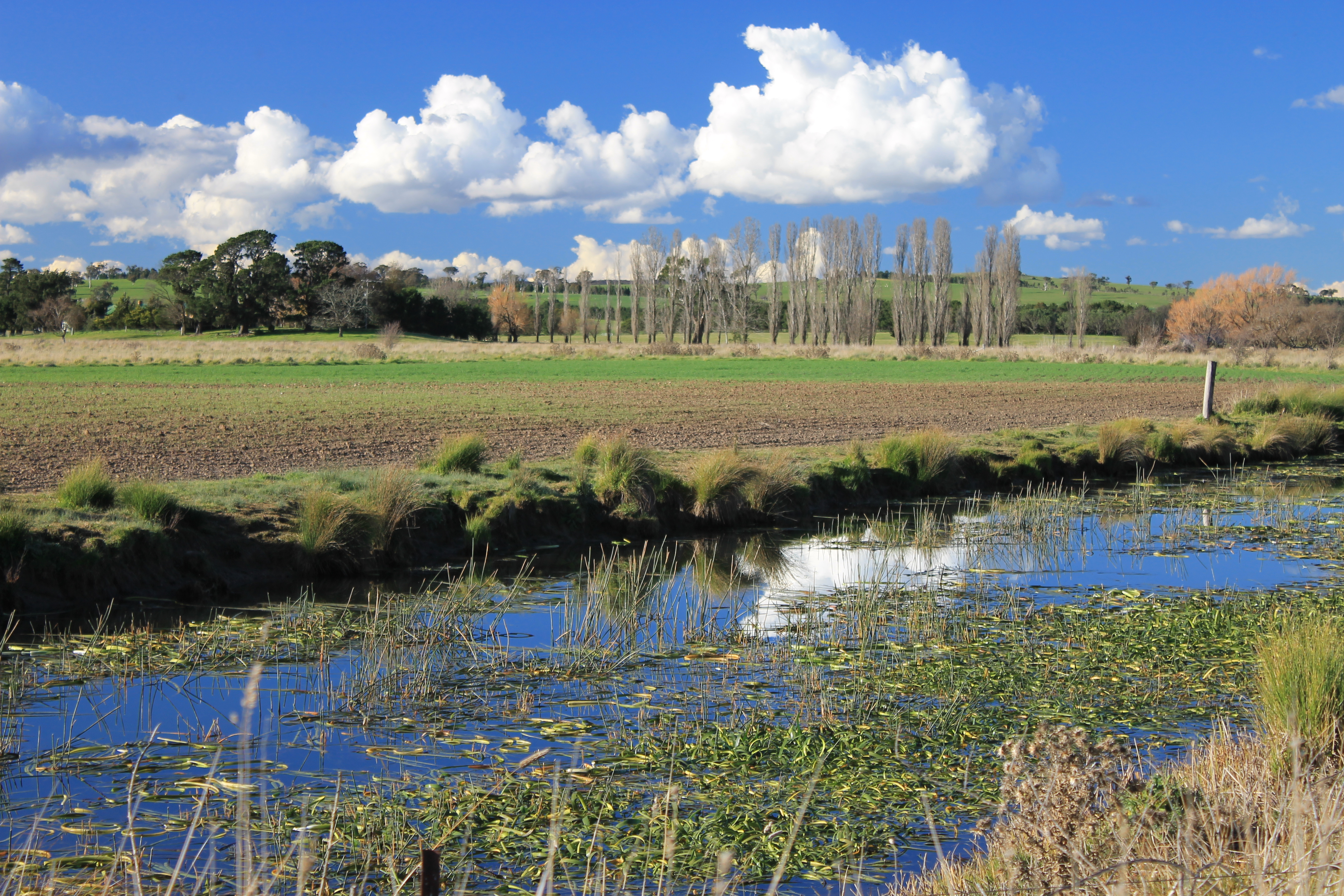
Agriculture in Tarago

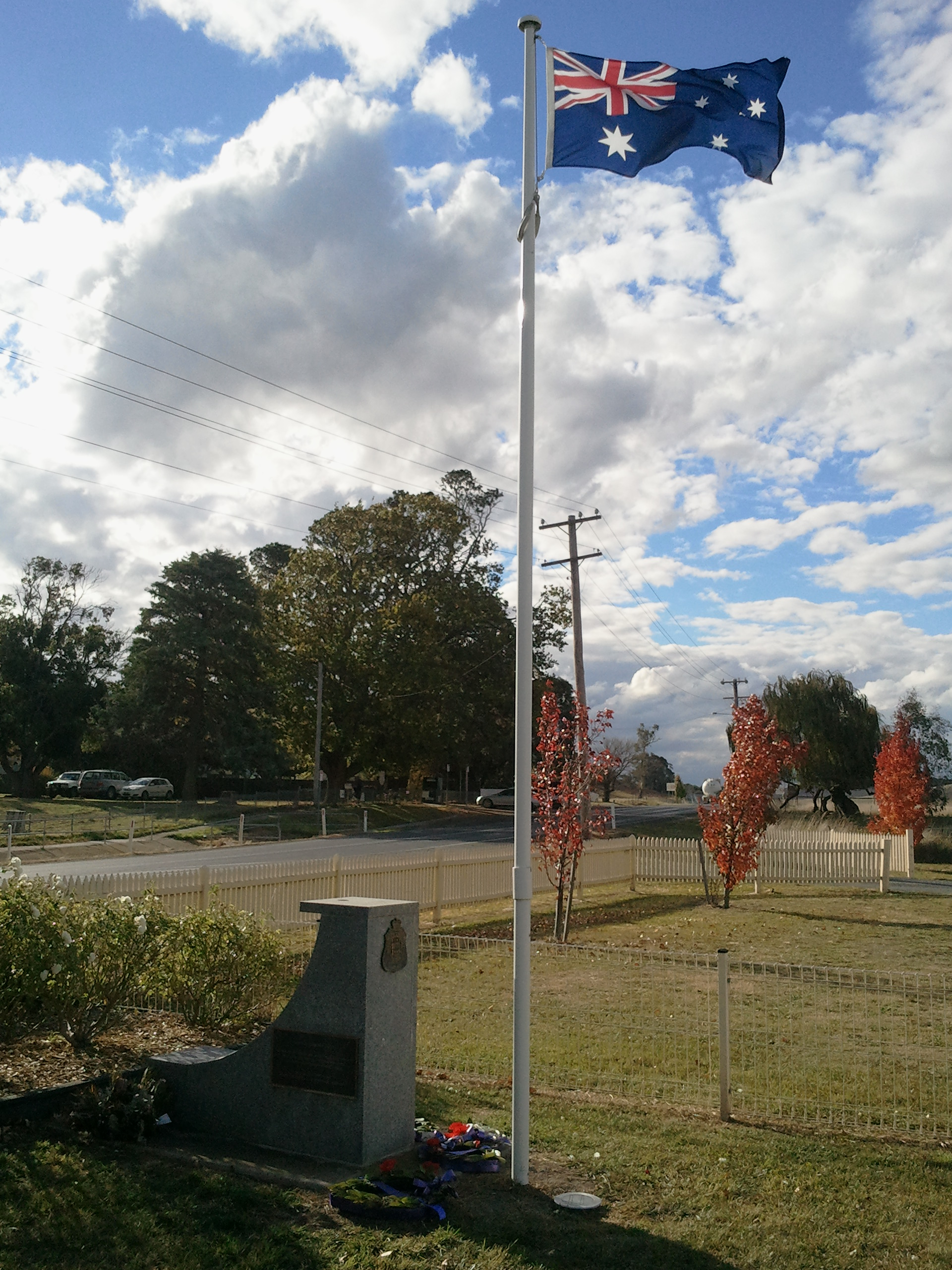
Tarago war memorial
