= Parish of Baw Baw =

Baw baw Parish New South Wales
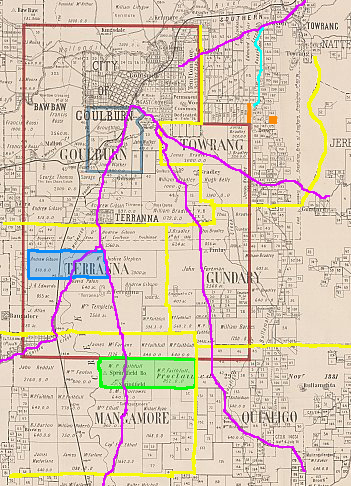
- location of Baw Baw
- LGA(s): Goulburn Mulwaree
- County: Argyle
- Division: Eastern

The Parish of Baw Baw is a parish of Argyle County, New South Wales, Australia. It is located in to the west of Goulburn, in Goulburn Mulwaree Council at 34°42′54″S, 149°38′04″E.

A village of Baw Baw was surveyed on the banks of the Wollondilly River, but was never constructed.

== History ==
The Baw Baw area was first inhabited by the Gundungurra people, and by the mid 1840s the NSW colonial government had granted numerous land grants in area, beginning white settlement.
