= Parish of Milbang =

Milbang Parish
- Cadastral division
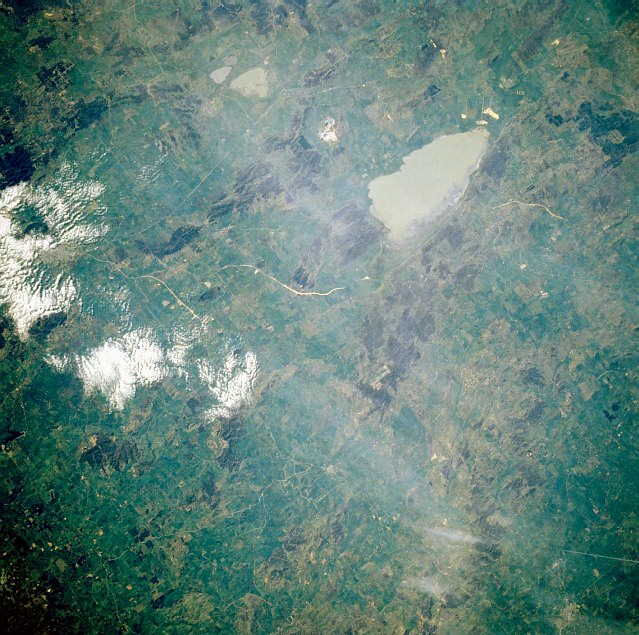
- Millibang Parish from Space Shuttle 2005.
- Country: Australia
- State: New South Wales
- LGA: Goulburn Mulwaree
- County: Argyle
- Division: Eastern

The Parish of Milbang is a parish of Argyle County, New South Wales, Australia, located at 34.4954°S 149.2604°E

The Parish is located close to the junction of the Federal Highway and Hume Highway and is 710m above sea level. The area was first inhabited by the Gundungurra people, with White settlement beginning in the 1840s.
