= Argyle County =

Argyle
- Cadastral division
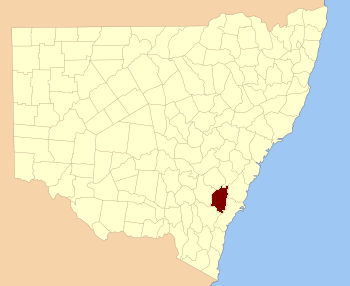
- Location of Argyle

- Coordinates: 34°49′24″S 149°44′04″E
- Country: Australia
- State: New South Wales
Lands administrative divisions around Argyle
Georgiana	Westmoreland	Camden
King	Argyle	St Vincent
Murray	Murray	St Vincent

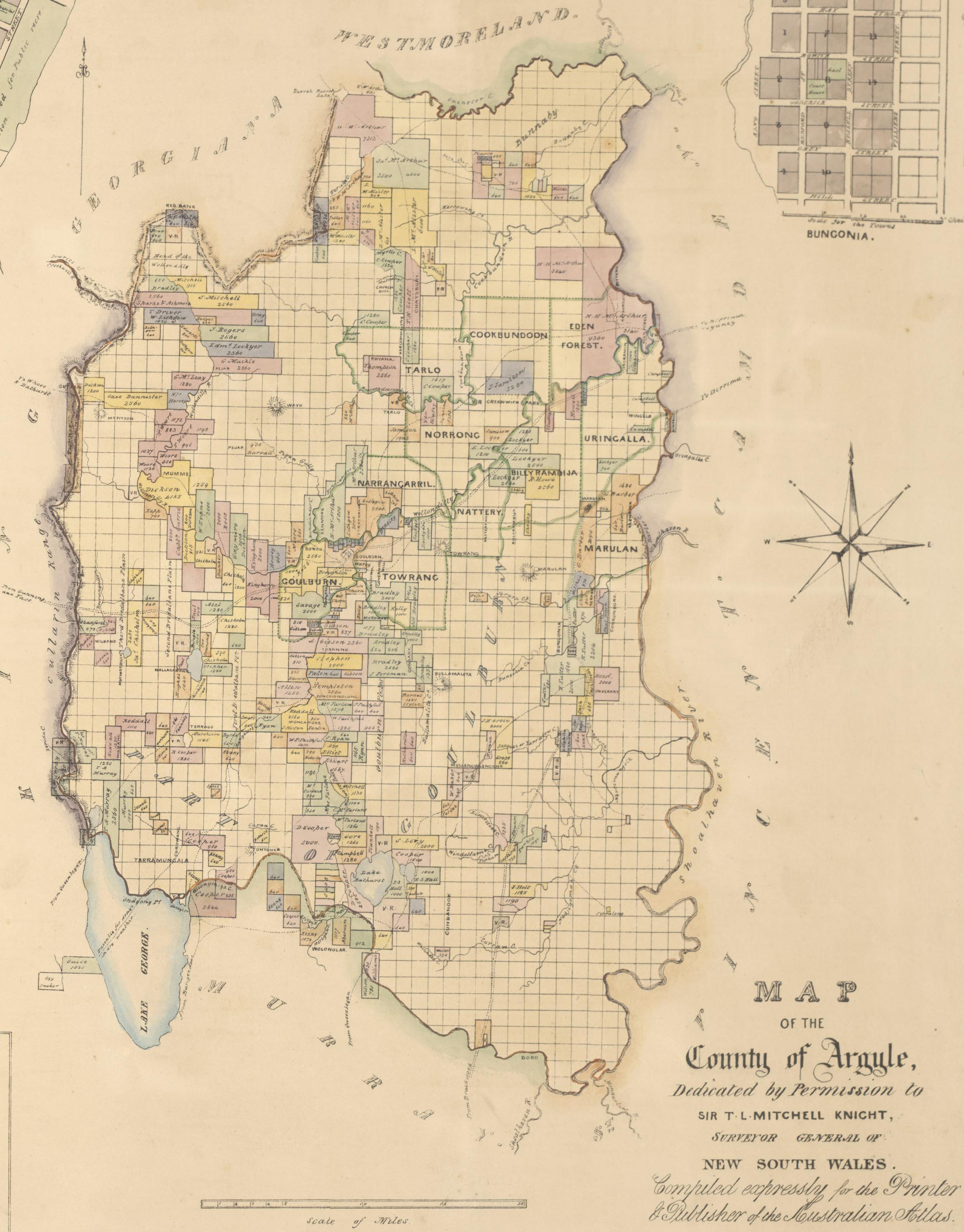
1840s map of the County of Argyle

Argyle County was one of the original Nineteen Counties in New South Wales and is now one of the 141 cadastral divisions of New South Wales. It includes the area around Goulburn. It is bounded by Lake George in the south-west, the Shoalhaven River in the east, and the Wollondilly River in the north-east.

Argyle County was named by Governor Macquarie after his native county in Scotland. He named it while inspecting the area in 1820.

In 1829 the Act for Instituting and regulating Courts of General and Quarter Sessions in New South Wales established courts in the county at Cookbundoon, Goulburn Plains and Inverary. James Byrne was Assistant Surveyor for the County in 1832. In 1835 Argyle had a magistrate and police force.

In 1852 it had an area of 1,248,600 acres (5,053 km^{2}) and population of 5,565. It was also described as having productive land and inexhaustible water.

In 1857, Charles Cowper was a major landowner in the area, and held 19,720 acres (79.8 km^{2}) in the county. The Electoral district of Argyle was the former state electoral district for the area between 1856 and 1904. The Encyclopædia Britannica Eleventh Edition mentions Goulburn as being in the county.

The Greater Argyle Council was formed in 2004 after a proposal to make a new local government area to focus on the County of Argyle, formed from an amalgamation of the former City of Goulburn and parts of Mulwaree Shire. It was renamed the Goulburn Mulwaree Council in October 2004.

== Parishes within this county ==
A full list of parishes found within this county; their current LGA and mapping coordinates to the approximate centre of each location is as follows:

Parish	LGA	Coordinates
Bannaby	Upper Lachlan	(34°23′54″S 149°59′04″E)
Baw Baw	Goulburn Mulwaree Council	(34°42′54″S 149°38′04″E)
Billyrambija	Goulburn Mulwaree Council	(34°40′54″S 149°56′04″E)
Boro	Goulburn Mulwaree Council	(35°07′54″S 149°45′04″E)
Bourke	Upper Lachlan	(34°21′54″S 150°02′04″E)
Breadalbane	Goulburn Mulwaree Council	(34°47′04″S 149°30′03″E)
Bungonia	Goulburn Mulwaree Council	(34°52′54″S 149°55′04″E)
Collector	Upper Lachlan	(34°54′54″S 149°25′04″E)
Cookbundoon	Upper Lachlan	(34°33′54″S 149°56′04″E)
Covan	Goulburn Mulwaree Council	(34°59′54″S 149°37′04″E)
Cullulla	Goulburn Mulwaree Council	(35°03′54″S 149°51′04″E)
Currawang	Palerang	(34°59′54″S 149°30′04″E)
Eden Forest	Upper Lachlan	(34°33′54″S 150°00′04″E)
Goulburn	Goulburn Mulwaree Council	(34°45′54″S 149°42′04″E)
Guineacor	Upper Lachlan	(34°23′20″S 149°47′19″E)
Gundary	Goulburn Mulwaree Council	(34°50′54″S 149°46′04″E)
Gurrundah	Upper Lachlan	(34°41′54″S 149°30′04″E)
Inverary	Goulburn Mulwaree Council	(34°54′54″S 150°02′04″E)
Jerralong	Goulburn Mulwaree Council	(35°06′54″S 149°58′04″E)
Jerrara	Goulburn Mulwaree Council	(34°47′54″S 150°00′04″E)
Kerrawary	Upper Lachlan	(34°27′54″S 150°00′04″E)
Mangamore	Goulburn Mulwaree Council	(34°54′54″S 149°40′04″E)
Marulan	Goulburn Mulwaree Council	(34°44′54″S 150°00′04″E)
Milbang	Upper Lachlan	(34°49′54″S 149°26′04″E)
Mullengullenga	Goulburn Mulwaree Council	(35°00′54″S 149°45′04″E)
Mulwaree	Goulburn Mulwaree Council	(35°05′54″S 149°40′04″E)
Mummel	Goulburn Mulwaree Council	(34°40′54″S 149°33′04″E)
Mutmutbilly	Upper Lachlan	(34°45′54″S 149°28′04″E)
Nadgigomar	Goulburn Mulwaree Council	(35°08′54″S 149°47′04″E)
Narrangarril	Goulburn Mulwaree Council	(34°41′54″S 149°44′04″E)
Nattery	Goulburn Mulwaree Council	(34°44′54″S 149°52′04″E)
Nerrimunga	Goulburn Mulwaree Council	(34°58′54″S 150°03′04″E)
Norrong	Goulburn Mulwaree Council	(34°39′54″S 149°52′04″E)
Oallen	Goulburn Mulwaree Council	(35°10′54″S 149°53′04″E)
Pejar	Upper Lachlan	(34°30′54″S 149°32′04″E)
Pomeroy	Upper Lachlan	(34°36′54″S 149°30′04″E)
Quialigo	Goulburn Mulwaree Council	(34°56′54″S 149°46′04″E)
Rhyana	Goulburn Mulwaree Council	(34°35′54″S 149°44′04″E)
Strathaird	Upper Lachlan	(34°27′54″S 149°53′04″E)
Tarago	Goulburn Mulwaree Council	(34°52′54″S 149°33′04″E)
Tarlo	Upper Lachlan	(34°34′54″S 149°48′04″E)
Terranna	Goulburn Mulwaree Council	(34°51′54″S 149°40′04″E)
Towrang	Goulburn Mulwaree Council	(34°44′54″S 149°45′04″E)
Turrallo	Upper Lachlan	(34°30′54″S 149°46′04″E)
Upper Tarlo	Upper Lachlan	(34°30′54″S 149°38′04″E)
Uringalla	Goulburn Mulwaree Council	(34°38′54″S 150°02′04″E)
Wayo	Upper Lachlan	(34°35′54″S 149°38′04″E)
Willeroo	Goulburn Mulwaree Council	(34°59′54″S 149°33′04″E)
Wologorong	Goulburn Mulwaree Council	(34°49′54″S 149°33′04″E)
Yarralaw	Goulburn Mulwaree Council	(34°59′54″S 149°52′04″E)
