= The Forest railway station =

Former railway station in New South Wales, Australia

The Forest

General information
- Location: Goulburn, New South Wales; Australia
- Coordinates: 34°37′29″S 149°43′56″E
- Operator: Public Transport Commission
- Line: Crookwell
- Distance: 241.920 kilometres from Central
- Platforms: 1
- Tracks: 2

Construction
- Structure type: Ground

Other information
- Status: Demolished

History
- Opened: 22 April 1902
- Closed: 9 March 1975

Services
Preceding station	Former services	Following station
Woodhouselee towards Crookwell	Crookwell Line	Norwood towards Goulburn
Location

The Forest railway station was a railway station on the Crookwell railway line, New South Wales, Australia. The station opened in 1902 with the opening of the line, and consisted of a 100 ft platform on the down side of the line with a loop siding on the up side. It was named after an adjoining property named Forest Lodge. The platform was removed in 1969 and the loop closed in 1974 and was subsequently demolished. The line through The Forest closed to goods traffic in 1984.
