= Norwood railway station =

Former railway station in New South Wales, Australia

Norwood

General information
- Location: Goulburn, New South Wales; Australia
- Coordinates: 34°40′50″S 149°43′59″E
- Operator: Department of Railways New South Wales
- Line: Crookwell
- Distance: 235.040 kilometres from Central
- Platforms: 1
- Tracks: 2

Construction
- Structure type: Ground

Other information
- Status: Demolished

History
- Opened: 22 April 1902
- Closed: February 1943

Services
Preceding station	Former services	Following station
The Forest towards Crookwell	Crookwell Line	Kenmore towards Goulburn
Location

Norwood railway station was a railway station on the Crookwell railway line, Australia. The station opened in 1902 with the opening of the line, and consisted of a 30-metre (100 ft) platform on the down side of the line with a loop siding on the up side. The siding was removed in 1941 and the station closed in 1943 and was subsequently demolished. The line through Norwood closed to goods traffic in 1984.
