= Woodhouselee railway station =

Former railway station in New South Wales, Australia

Woodhouselee
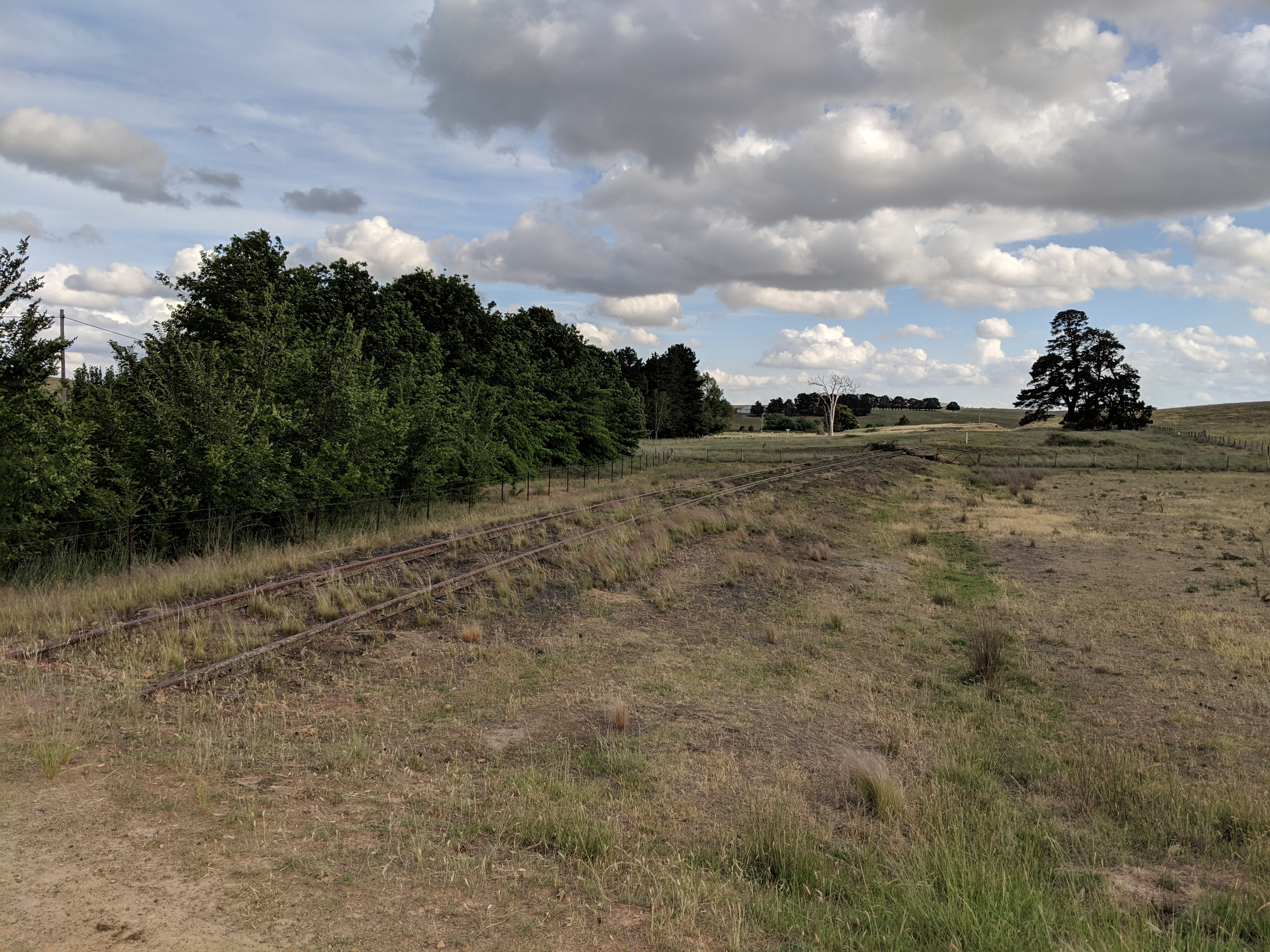
- Railway in Woodhouselee looking south

General information
- Location: Woodhouselee, New South Wales; Australia
- Coordinates: 34°34′07″S 149°37′49″E
- Operator: Public Transport Commission
- Line: Crookwell
- Distance: 255.000 kilometres from Central
- Platforms: 1
- Tracks: 2

Construction
- Structure type: Ground

Other information
- Status: Demolished

History
- Opened: 22 April 1902
- Closed: 9 March 1975

Services
Preceding station	Former services	Following station
Roslyn towards Crookwell	Crookwell Line	The Forest towards Goulburn
Location

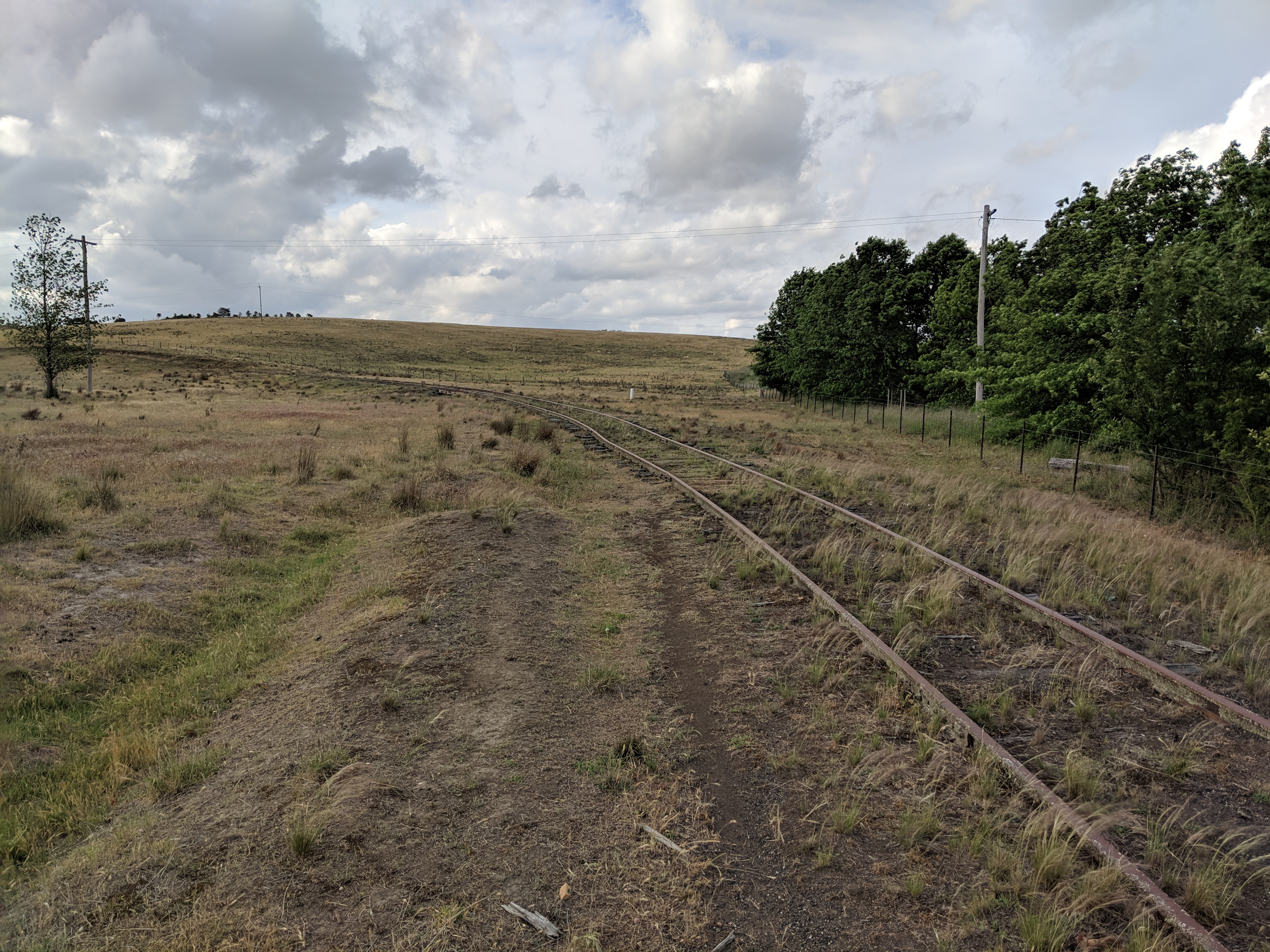
Railway in Woodhouselee looking north

Woodhouselee railway station was a railway station on the Crookwell railway line, in Woodhouselee, New South Wales, Australia. The station opened in 1902 with the opening of the line, and consisted of a 100 ft platform on the up side of the line with a loop siding on the down side. It was named after a local resident Mr Woodhouse. The platform was closed in 1974 with the cessation of passenger services and subsequently demolished. The line through Woodhouselee closed to goods traffic in 1984, the loop has been removed but the mainline remains intact.
