= Argyle railway station, New South Wales =

Former railway station in New South Wales, Australia

Argyle

General information
- Location: Goulburn, New South Wales; Australia
- Coordinates: 34°44′28″S 149°44′20″E
- Operator: Department of Railways New South Wales
- Line: Crookwell
- Distance: 227.620 kilometres from Central
- Platforms: 1
- Tracks: 1

Construction
- Structure type: Ground

Other information
- Status: Demolished

History
- Opened: 22 April 1902
- Closed: 17 May 1969

Services
Preceding station	Former services	Following station
Kenmore towards Crookwell	Crookwell Line	Goulburn Terminus
Location

Argyle railway station was a railway station on the Crookwell railway line, New South Wales, Australia. The station opened in 1902 with the opening of the line, and consisted of a 50 ft platform on the down side of the line. It gained its name from Argyle in Scotland, and was located adjacent to the Goulburn Training Centre.

In 1942 a loop siding was constructed, by 1969 both this and the platform had been demolished. North of the station lies the bridge over the Wollondilly River.
