= McAlister railway station =

Former railway station in New South Wales, Australia

McAlister

General information
- Location: Laggan, New South Wales; Australia
- Coordinates: 34°26′23″S 149°33′05″E
- Operator: Public Transport Commission
- Line: Crookwell
- Distance: 274.530 kilometres from Central
- Platforms: 1
- Tracks: 2

Construction
- Structure type: Ground

Other information
- Status: Demolished

History
- Opened: 22 April 1902
- Closed: 9 March 1975

Services
Preceding station	Former services	Following station
Crookwell Terminus	Crookwell Line	Roslyn towards Goulburn
Location

McAlister railway station was a railway station on the Crookwell railway line, in Laggan, New South Wales, Australia. The station opened in 1902 with the opening of the line, and consisted of a 100 ft platform on the up side of the line with a loop siding on the down side. It was named after magistrate Lachlan McAlister. Some goods facilities were removed in the 1930s. The remainder of the station and loop closed in 1969 and were subsequently removed. The line through McAlister closed to goods traffic in 1984. Little remains at the site apart from the mainline track and a loading bank.
