= Roslyn railway station, New South Wales =

Former railway station in New South Wales, Australia

Roslyn
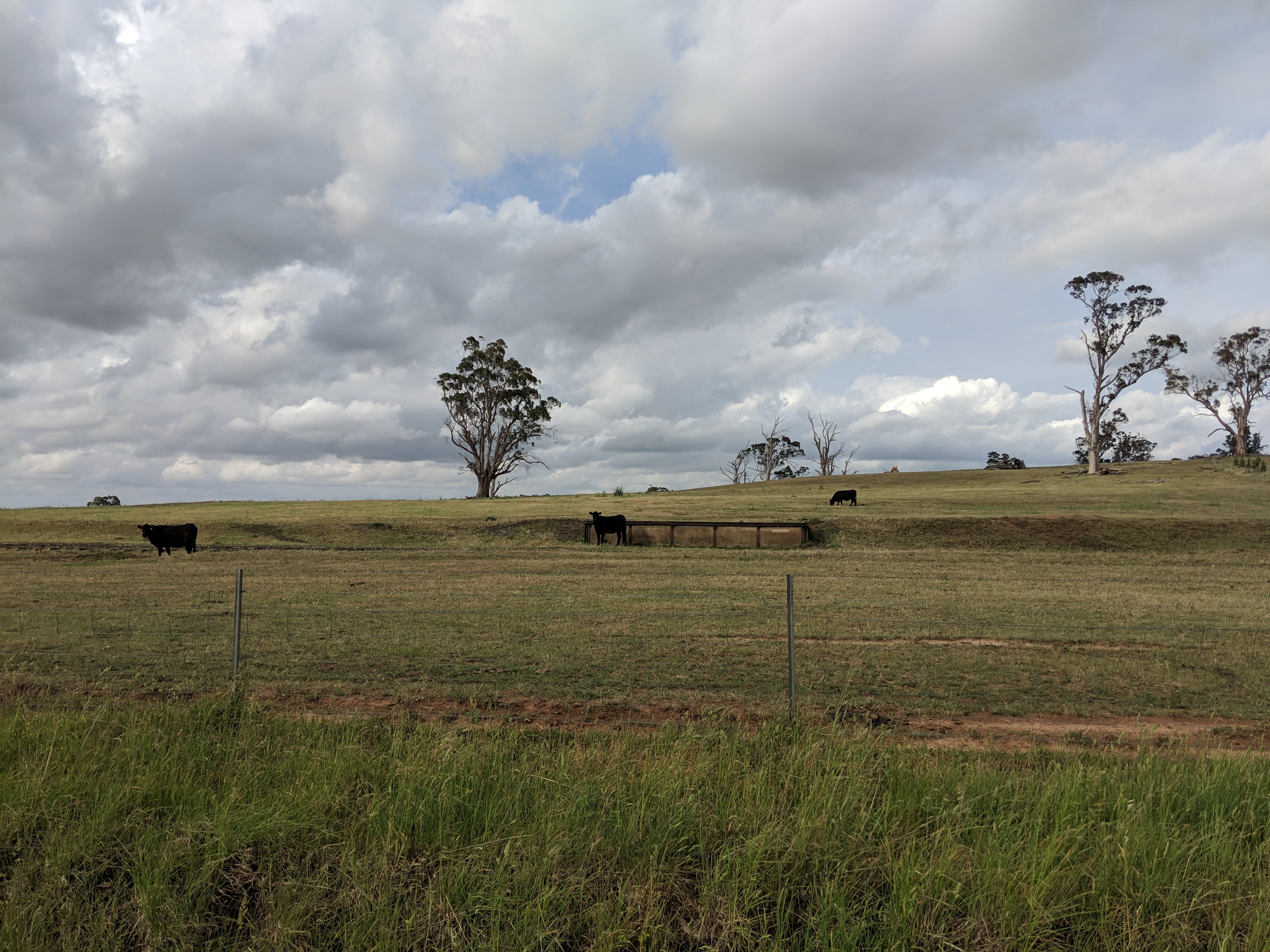
- Site of former station

General information
- Location: Middle Arm Rd, Roslyn, New South Wales; Australia
- Coordinates: 34°30′05″S 149°36′36″E
- Elevation: 980 m (3,220 ft)
- Operator: Public Transport Commission
- Lines: Crookwell; Taralga
- Distance: 264.650 kilometres from Central
- Platforms: 1
- Tracks: 3

History
- Opened: 22 April 1902
- Closed: 21 August 1974

Services
| Preceding station | Former services | Following station |
|---|---|---|
| McAlister towards Crookwell | Crookwell Line | Woodhouselee towards Goulburn |
| Willigam towards Taralga | Taralga Line | Terminus |
Location

Roslyn railway station was a railway station on the Crookwell railway line, New South Wales, Australia. The station opened in 1902 with the opening of the line, and consisted of a 100 ft platform on the down side of the line with a loop siding on the up side. Cattle loading facilities and goods sheds were also provided. It was named after the estate of a local resident Dr Mitchell. In 1925, the station became the location of the branch line to Taralga, with the new branch extending off the loop line. The platform was shortened to 30 ft in 1969, and closed in 1974 with the cessation of passenger services. In 1975, the station and goods facilities were demolished. The line through Roslyn closed to goods traffic in 1984, and little remains at the site apart from the mainline track, the goods loading bank and the station master's residence.
