= Main Southern railway line =

Railway line in New South Wales, Australia

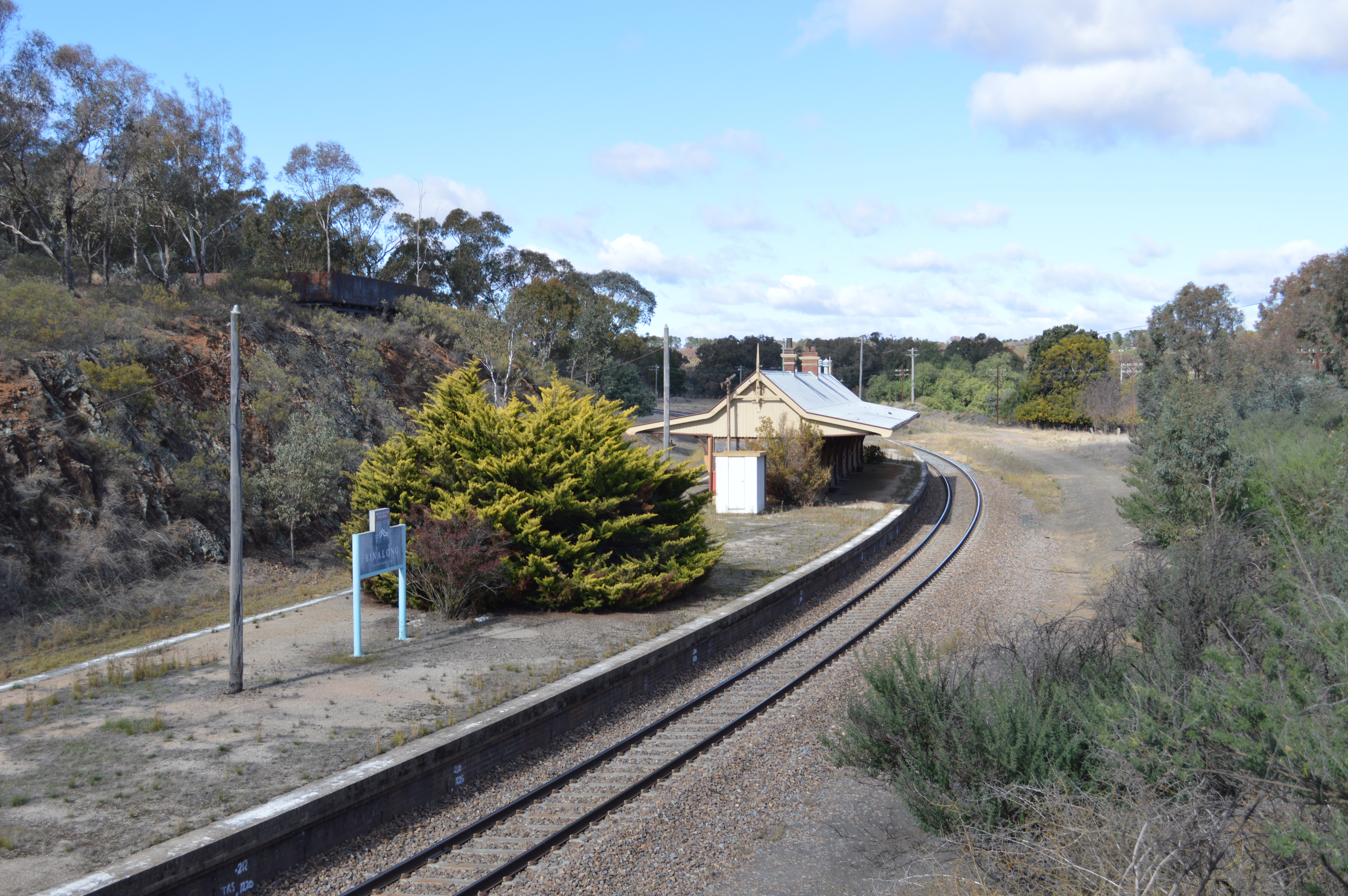
- 1916 Binalong station (now closed), 2013

Overview
- Status: Open
- Termini: Lidcombe; Albury
- Continues from: Main Suburban railway line
- Continues as: North East railway line
- Stations: 46 open

History
- Commenced: 1855
- Completed: 1881

Technical
- Line length: 650 km (400 mi)
- Number of tracks: 2 (Lidcombe-Junee) 1 (Junee-Albury)
- Track gauge: 1,435 mm (4 ft 8 1/2 in)
- Electrification: 1500 V DC overhead catenary as far as Macarthur

The Main Southern railway line or Great Southern Railway is a major railway in New South Wales, Australia. It runs from Sydney to Albury, near the Victorian border. The line passes through the Southern Highlands, Southern Tablelands, South West Slopes and Riverina regions.

== Description of route ==
The Main Southern Railway commences as an electrified pair of tracks in the Sydney metropolitan area. Since 1924, the line branches from the Main Suburban railway line at Lidcombe and runs via Regents Park to Cabramatta, where it rejoins the original route from Granville. The line then heads towards Campbelltown and Macarthur, the current limit of electrification and suburban passenger services. The electrification previously extended to Glenlee Colliery, but this was removed following the cessation of electric haulage of freight trains in the 1990s.

The line continues as a double non-electrified track south through the Southern Highlands towns of Mittagong and Goulburn to Junee on the Southern Plains. Here the line becomes single track for the remainder of its journey south to the state border with Victoria at Albury. The North East railway line then continues through northern Victoria to Melbourne.

There are six tunnels on the line: the Picton tunnel, the Yerrinbool tunnel, the Aylmerton tunnel, the Gib (Mt Gibraltar) tunnel, and the two "up" track tunnels in the Bethungra Spiral.

The line north of Macarthur is maintained by the Transport Asset Holding Entity. South of Macarthur the line is leased to the Australian Rail Track Corporation until 2064.

Though the bulk of the line has a maximum gradient of 1.5%, the ruling grade of the line is 2.5% due to short, steep sections of track between Binalong and Harden.

== Development of the line ==
On 26 September 1855, the first railway in New South Wales, the Sydney to Granville railway opened. Exactly a year later, a branch was opened from what was known as Parramatta Junction (the present day Granville) to Liverpool.

=== Parramatta Junction (Granville) to Liverpool ===
The Liverpool line extension commenced from Parramatta Junction (now Granville) and was constructed by Mr. W Randle. The turning of the first sod occurring 20 November 1855.

The line was constructed as a single track of 8.5 miles (13.7 km) in length laid with double-headed rails of 75 lb (34 kg) per yard and with fish joints. The total construction cost was placed at £120,040 4s. 11d.

The railway was officially opened 18 August 1856 as a result of the inspection of the line by the Governor General. The press attending the inspection also noted, "the country [the railway] traverses offers great facilities for railway continuation, being for the most part level and even."

The building of the railway wasn't without incident as on 16 August 1856, a man died as a result of a derailment. The guard on the front of the train noted, "a plank lying across the rails near where [a fencer] was working."

The Parramatta Junction (Granville) – Liverpool line was opened to the public 1 September 1856.

=== Liverpool to Campbelltown ===
The Cumberland County was a large producer of agricultural products such as wheat, maize, beef, and wool. This, combined with an approximate 10,000 passengers travelling between Sydney and Campbelltown in 1846, and community support, provided impetus for the construction of a railway line from Sydney to Campbelltown at the earliest possible opportunity.

On 29 October 1856, it was announced that the Great Southern Railway was to be extended [single line] from Liverpool to Campbelltown with the stations between Liverpool and Campbelltown yet to be determined although, "every landholder on the line is quite prepared to prove to the satisfaction of the Commissioners that the proper place for a station is on his property."

Owing to financial difficulties, turnover of skilled specialist, and several gold rushes depriving the company of labour, preparations for the construction of a railway reaching Campbelltown didn't commence until 1857 via the issue of a notice from the Commissioner of Railways. In the meantime, the plans and estimates (at approximately £11,500 per mile) for the line were completed and sent to the Colonial Secretary in August 1856. These plans and estimates were considered to be, "in such a state of forwardness, that they may be contracted for at once".

As per the notice, the line was to commence from the south end of Liverpool Railway Station, "and extend thence for twelve miles eight chains, or thereabouts, in a south-westerly direction, through the parishes of Saint Luke, Minto, and Saint Peter, to the Town of Campbelltown, and ending at the south fence of a lane on the property of Charles Morris..." The line was to not exceed a gradient of 1 in 100 and the smallest radius of a curve being 30 chains. The railway is to be, "a single line throughout, laid with the double-headed rail, 75lbs to the yard, on cross sleepers, with chairs, and fish jointed."

On 25 April 1857, the tender for the first four miles of the extension was won by a Mr. W. Randle with the fencing and timber for the extension being awarded to Messrs. Scott and Jolly on 27 April 1857. Scott and Jolly had constructed a large sawmill at Cabramatta and sourced wood (primarily ironbark) from the nearby forest. This wood was used for the sleepers on the extension.

On 7 May 1857, construction began with, "the first turf of the railway in extension of the great Southern Railway from Liverpool to Campbelltown, was turned (. . .) without any particular ceremony."

Randle, having been able to keep to the scheduled completion date of 1 September, offered to continue the construction of the line through to Campbelltown at the same cost per mile. However, the commissioners, "declined to accept it, having determined to advertise for tenders for each portion separately".

Initially, a Mr. Hall had won the tender for the remaining distance to Campbelltown, but through some arrangement (nefarious or otherwise), Randle had been announced as the winner of the tender. It was also revealed that Randle had won the tender at a higher price than that which Randle had initially offered.

Progress continued to be made for the extension to Campbelltown (plus an extension beyond to Goulburn) and by August 1857, construction of the line had progressed significantly; telegraph poles had been delivered alongside the proposed railway line through Campbelltown in preparation for its construction. These telegraph poles would later form part of the Sydney-Albury telegraph line.

On 29 August 1857, it was reported that the construction of the railway was advancing rapidly and that, "...there are a great many men already at work clearing the most woody portion of the line, about four miles from here, the real track is now easily to be traced by the formidable looking posts erected for the electric telegraph."

Even prior to the opening of the extension, land values surrounding the railway corridor was noted to have increased by 250 percent, and the anticipation of the opening was growing.

On 17 April 1858, a navvy (by the name of "Romilly") working on the construction of the extension was killed when, "a truck of sleepers passing along the rail by mischance overturned upon the unfortunate man. He was picked up senseless, and at once conveyed to the Liverpool Hospital, where it was found that life was quite extinct."

Finally, 29 April 1858 saw the first train arrived within one hundred yards of Campbelltown Railway Station. This train carried the Commissioner of Railways (Captain Ben Martindale), Chief Engineer John Whitton, and staff of the railway office. They then inspected the buildings and subsequently boarded the train to return to Sydney.

The Liverpool – Campbelltown railway line was opened 4 May 1858.

=== Campbelltown to Menangle ===
The construction of the railway to Goulburn was always going to extend beyond Campbelltown. But the path for the extensions considered multiple options (including Menangle) while also explicitly excluding a path aligning with the dreaded Razorback road. The survey of multiple options at the time were considered prudent as, "The expense and trouble of such survey of (...) lines would be trifling, as compared with the survey of the Eastern line."

As early as 29 April 1846, the path of the Great Southern Railway was to cross through the parish of Menangle. In January 1852, surveyors were dispatched to commence the first of multiple surveys of a line towards Goulburn with the first section being, "the line running by Menangle, between Campbell Town and Myrtle Creek." Myrtle Creek was the former name of Tahmoor. Another survey was conducted at the direction of Gother K. Mann, Chief Commissioner of Sydney, and Hunter River Railways. Moving traffic from the Southern Road and onto rail was a primary motivator for making the line profitable.

Delays in the survey were causing some frustration within the Legislative Assembly. The Commissioner stated that the extension to Campbelltown and then onto Menangle would, "have intercepted the traffic of the Southern Road, and made the present lines remunerative. The Government would thus have been placed in possession of information that would have fully determined the question of railway extension as applicable to the present wants of the colony."

Despite delays, and even before the government had announced the exact path of the line, anticipation for it could be seen in advertising of property and housing near Menangle. However, there were some rumblings within the community about the priority of the line over other lines such as the one to Windsor, Penrith, and Singleton.

On 16 November 1857, the government projected the cost and constraints for the line to, "not exceed £10,000 per mile; the worst gradient being 1 in 80, and the smallest radius of a curve 40 chains."

Proclamation of the line was made 4 November 1858 and published the following day as, "to make and complete that portion of the Great Southern Railway, commencing near to the Campbelltown Station, in the parish of St Peter, and county of Cumberland, at a point marked A on the proclaimed Plan, and terminating near to the Nepean River, at a point marked B on the proclaimed Plan, in the parish of Menangle, and county of Cumberland, being a distance of five miles and sixty chains."

In April 1859, Peto, Brassey & Betts, represented by their agent, Alexander Rhodes, signed a contract with the government for the extension of a number of lines in the colony, including the line from Campbelltown to Menangle. Rhodes had arrived from England as an agent of Peto, Brassey & Betts for the execution of the contract. This contract was exempt from the rules of public competition as the government felt there was no suitable contractor available to complete the work. The existing contractors were either unreliable, not going to submit a proposal, or unable to complete the contract.

By July 1859, construction "begins to exhibit considerable progress in the cuttings and embankments". And by August 1859, Rhodes had made significant progress on the extensions. Two thirds of the works had been finished with a third of this ready for the laying of the ballast and rails. The progress was characterised as being constructed, "with the energy and admirable system; which have characterised the operations of these eminent contractors in various parts of the world".

On 12 November 1859, the progress of construction was reported to be well advanced with considerable earthworks, wooden bridges, several culverts and under bridges having been completed. The work was described as being, "in a very forward state, and will, if it receives the same amount of labour that has hitherto been bestowed upon it, soon be ready for the permanent way".

However, Rhodes was feeling the pressure of delivery on time. Rhodes criticised the Engineer-in-Chief of withholding rails and expressed, "remonstrances [...] that the timber bridges proposed for the lines would not be sufficiently strong for the traffic they would have to carry." It did not help Rhodes' cause that a number of men working on the project had left to assist with the harvest of nearby farms. But, at the same time, it was noted that brickmaking and other works were continuing in their absence.

By 13 March 1860, the progress of the extension was characterised as, "generally a forward aspect, and, with the exception of the bridge over the Nepean, that portion of the line might be completed within four months."

It was reported in the same month that the earthworks for the laying of the line had been completed for some time. A description of the line was published as, "Starting from Campbelltown, the country being for some distance tolerably level, the line is carried along a low embankment, and for nearly two miles keeps within sight of the road. About three-quarters of a mile beyond Campbelltown, the old Southern Road through Camden and the new one through Menangle unite; the line crosses the former road a few yards beyond its junction with the latter; being slightly above the level of the road, the road has been raised for a level crossing. The formation of the line as far as the Camden road has for a long time been finished, and is ready for the ballasting and permanent way; and temporary rails have been laid down for the convenience of the contractors."

It is at this time, with the line ready for laying, the viaduct crossing the formidable Nepean River was the main obstacle to the completion of the line into Menangle. Flooding from the river had recently destroyed some embankments and carried off some sleepers but no injuries were reports.

South of the Nepean River, the line resumes along a high embankment and passes by, "a cluster of houses known as Riversford, the residents in which are chiefly cultivators of the rich agricultural land through which the line runs for some distance, and which is the property of Messrs. Macarthur."

The government and Rhodes were often arguing over the cost and delays in completing the contract. In March 1860, in a review of the contract for the construction of the line, Rhodes submitted their version to the Legislative Assembly of events leading up to the signing, and execution, of the contract . Rhodes explained the history of the engagement of Peto, Brassey & Betts and of Rhodes' arrival to the colony to execute on the contract. Rhodes then proceeds to list the issues encountered and the concerns expressed to the government in great detail.

By this time, the government had lost faith in Rhodes and had written to Peto, Brassey & Betts to have Rhodes recalled to England. The government also informed Rhodes that Peto, Brassey & Betts would not be considered for any future contracts. It is possible there may have been a personal and/or professional conflict between the Chief Commissioner, Captain Martindale and the Executive Government, and Rhodes. On 20 June 1860, Rhodes subsequently acknowledged this loss of faith by the government.

On 23 October 1861, it was reported that the line is being ballasted in a number of places between Campbelltown and Picton with the permanent way being laid between Campbelltown and Menangle. The work was predicted to be completed well before the contracted time of 1 January 1863.

The completion of the line, except for the viaduct, was nearing, with ongoing ballasting and the laying of the permanent way to be completed. The extension from Campbelltown to within a few metres of the bridge was to be completed within a few days, "but no arrangements are being made for opening the line".

At the northern end of the river, a platform was constructed at a terminus of the line to allow passengers to board and alight from the train. This terminus was only temporary as, "the permanent Menangle Station is to be ready a mile further on the south side of the Nepean."

The extension from Campbelltown to the temporary terminus was opened for traffic on 1 September 1862.

The opening of the line attracted dignitaries from the colony. His Excellency the Governor and Lady Young, plus others accompanied the Minister for Works to the site. The viceregal party arrived at the temporary terminus and Mr Willcox then "showed and explained the works".

The complete opening of the line to Menangle was unexpectedly delayed due to the loss of the ship containing the iron girders for the northern span of the bridge.

=== Menangle to Douglas Park ===
On 26 July 1859, the proclamation for the section of the line from Menangle to Douglas Park (sometimes referred to as "Douglass Park") was made. This was to be part of the extension of the Great Southern Railway from Campbelltown through to Picton and was to extend the line 6 miles and 42 links (9.5 km) from Menangle.

A small ceremony was held where the first sod for the extensions was at Douglas Park 2 August 1859. It was attended by Peto, Brassey, and Betts, several contractors, and Miss Douglass, the daughter of the Hon G Douglass, M.L.C.

Upon the turning of the sod, "three cheers were then given for the Queen, three for success to railways, and three for the contractors, which, being suitably acknowledged, the company partook of a well-served collation, and left highly pleased with their visit."

By 12 November 1859, progress was reported on as being, "not so forward as on this side [from Campbelltown to Menangle]" but steadily progressing. Progress continued to be slow through the first half of 1860 due to the need for heavy works at Douglas Park and Spaniards Hill. This slow progress and ongoing disputes between Rhodes and the government was to be the overarching theme of the construction for the year. The nature of the dispute was what was considered shale (included as "earthworks" in the contract), and rock (not included in the contract).

On 1 July 1863, the railway to Douglas Park was opened as part of the opening of the line to Picton.

=== Douglas Park to Picton ===
The proclamation for the extension of the railway to Picton was made 9 August 1859.

The completion of the Menangle viaduct, on 1 July 1863, allowed for the opening of the entire line between Campbelltown and Picton. Prior to its opening, on 29 June 1863, his Excellency Sir John Young and Lady Young were accompanied by other colonial dignitaries to visit Picton prior to the opening of the line. The party crossed the viaduct to Picton, had lunch, and returned again across the viaduct to Sydney.

On the day of the opening, a "sumptuous banquet" was put on by Samuel Wilcox Esq. for the men who had been employed on the works. The banquet was situated to the right of the station near the road with a, "marquee, with long tables, and capable of seating three hundred persons, and in an adjacent paddock were congregated the German band and numerous groups of navvies and their friends and spectators."

=== Picton to Nattai (Mittagong) ===
On 5 April 1855, a letter to the editor was published in the Sydney Morning Herald that proposed building a railway to the Fitzroy Ironworks and Coal Company in Nattai. It wasn't until 26 July 1862 that tenders to supply for the extension were first invited.

In September 1862, work commenced on the extension. The 30 mile (48 km) extension from Picton to Nattai extension included the need for heavy earthworks, crossing several Nattai River tributaries and requiring, "four or five large viaducts, the longest of which will be about three hundred feet in length."

Many issues relating to the contractors resulted in multiple delays to construction. However, upon resolution, work progressed steadily. It was noted that, "it is felt, however, that any more than ordinary energy of action would tend to raise labour rates, and this, the process at which contracts have been taken, will not admit of."

By 24 February 1864, positive progress was being reported with the bridge piers and abutments at Stonequarry Creek completed. Progress was expected to be, "pushed on more rapidly upon the completion of four steam cranes, two locomotives, and other machinery, which are being made for the contractors and the use of which will greatly facilitate the execution of the works." Subsequently, steady progress was reported for the remainder of 1864 and 1865 and by November 1865, rails were being delivered to Picton for laying on the freshly ballasted permanent way. However, the final section to the Fitzroy Ironworks required heavy earthworks, "the execution of which will delay for many months the opening of the railway to Mittagong."

With construction nearing completion, a journalist, Mr. Waverley, from the Sydney Morning Herald visited the extension describing the journey from Picton to Nattai as passing through several cuttings, embankments, and crossing the Great Southern Road near the Industrial School. At this time, the proposed station at Mittagong had not yet been built.

On 22 February 1867, the official opening of the extension was announced by the Commissioner for Railways. It was to take place on 28 February 1867 and then, "be opened for public traffic on the first (1st) proximo [1 March 1867]."

The opening of the extension was reported as, "so important to the welfare of the district [that it] could not be permitted to transpire without attracting to the scene the inhabitants of Mittagong, Bong Bong, Wingecarribee, and Sutton Forest."

A special train, arranged for the occasion, left the Redfern Terminus at 10am and arrived at Mittagong at 1:30pm. Upon arrival, guests and dignitaries were served lunch in marquees plus a separate, grander marquee, "In which two hundred navvies with many of their wives and families, were being treated to a sumptuous and substantial dinner of roast beef plum pudding, and English ale."

The Picton – Mittagong railway line was opened for public traffic 1 March 1867.

=== Continued extensions ===
This line was extended to Goulburn in 1869, Yass Junction in 1876, Galong, Harden-Murrumburrah and Cootamundra in 1877 and Junee and Bomen (on the north bank of the Murrumbidgee River) in 1878. The Murrumbidgee River Railway Bridge was completed in 1881 and the line was extended to Wagga Wagga, Uranquinty, The Rock, Henty and Albury in 1881. Victorian Railways' North East 1,600 mm (5 ft 3 in) gauge line was extended from Wodonga to Albury in 1883. To accommodate the break of gauge, a very long railway platform was built, the covered platform being one of the longest in Australia. The original alignment was built under the supervision of John Whitton, Engineer-in-Charge of the New South Wales Government Railways from 1856 to 1898.

The two main sections of the line that were deviated; the Old Main South line (in blue) and the Picton - Mittagong Loop line (in purple)

The original single track was duplicated from Granville to Liverpool in 1857, to Campbelltown in 1891, to Picton in 1892. Between 1913 and 1922 the 343 km (213 mi) section from Picton to Cootamundra was duplicated. At the same time, the section between Picton and Mittagong was deviated by a less direct route in 1919 to ease the steep grades of the original alignment, and the old line became known as the Picton – Mittagong loop railway line which is now largely closed. (The Main Southern Railway Deviation, was estimated in the 1914 Act of Parliament to have construction costs of £630,353).

The Widemere Quarry Line was linked to the line at Fairfield in 1924, before the line closed in 1945. Other sections of the original Whitton alignment between Goulburn and Wagga Wagga were also replaced by more curvy sections with lower grades. The section between Granville and Cabramatta via Fairfield was bypassed with a more direct route from Lidcombe via Regents Park in 1924. The former route through Fairfield became known as the Old Main South. The section from Cootamundra to Junee, including a rail spiral at Bethungra, was duplicated between 1941 and 1945. Construction of a standard gauge track parallel with the broad gauge track from Albury to Melbourne commenced in 1959, completing the Sydney-Melbourne railway. The first freight train operated on the line on 3 January 1962, followed by the first passenger train on 16 April 1962.

The original wrought iron Murrumbidgee River Railway Bridge at Wagga Wagga was replaced in 2007 by a new concrete and steel bridge. The main line south of Junee was substantially upgraded in 2007 and 2008, including the construction of passing loops up to 7 km (4.3 mi). Redbank Tunnel near Tahmoor closed on 30 November 2012 when replaced by a deviation funded by Xstrata to allow expansion of its Tahmoor Colliery under the tunnel which was sealed. In January 2013, the Australian Rail Track Corporation opened the Southern Sydney Freight Line between Sefton and Macarthur as a dedicated line for freight services.

=== Branches ===
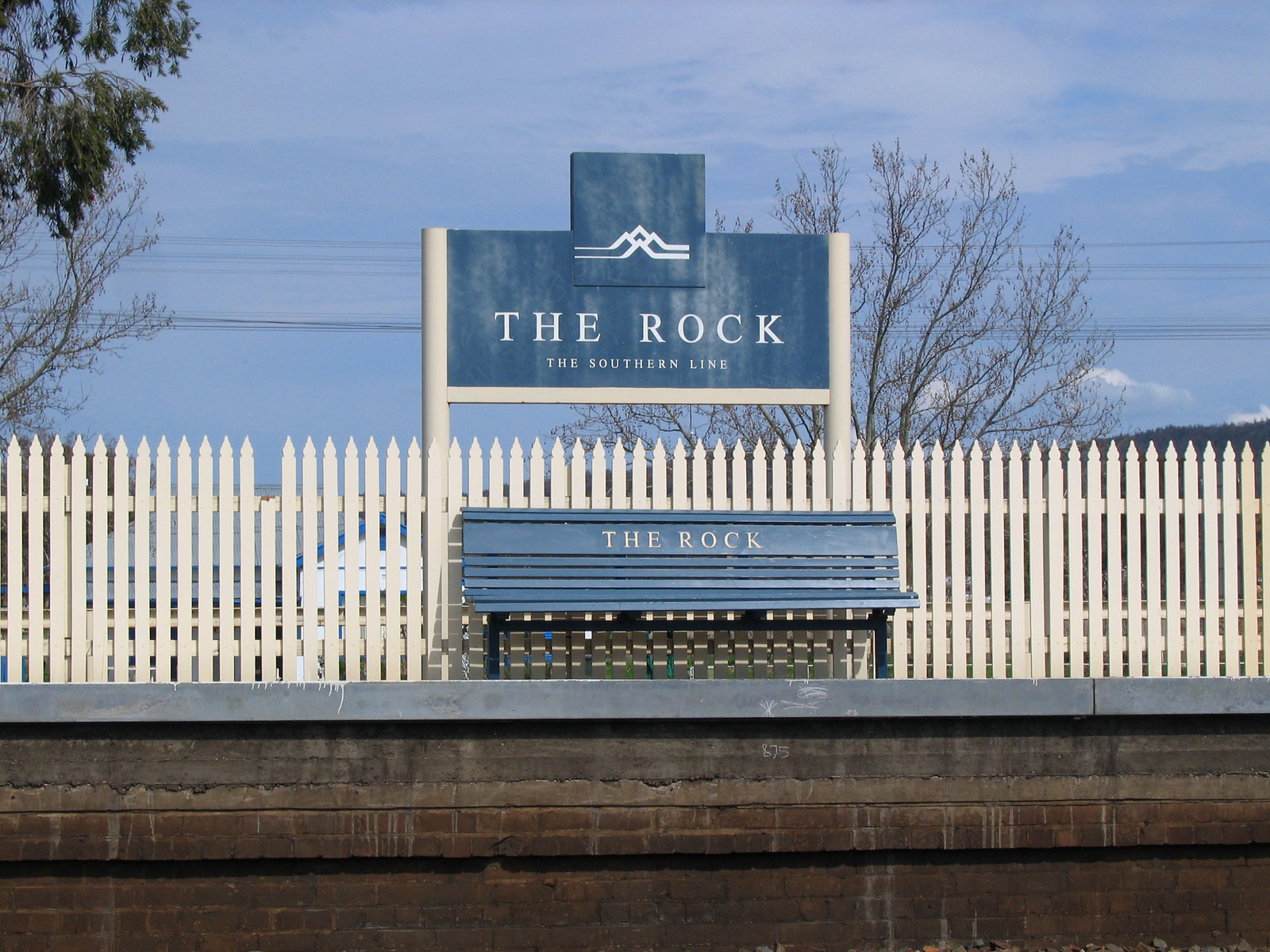
The Rock station

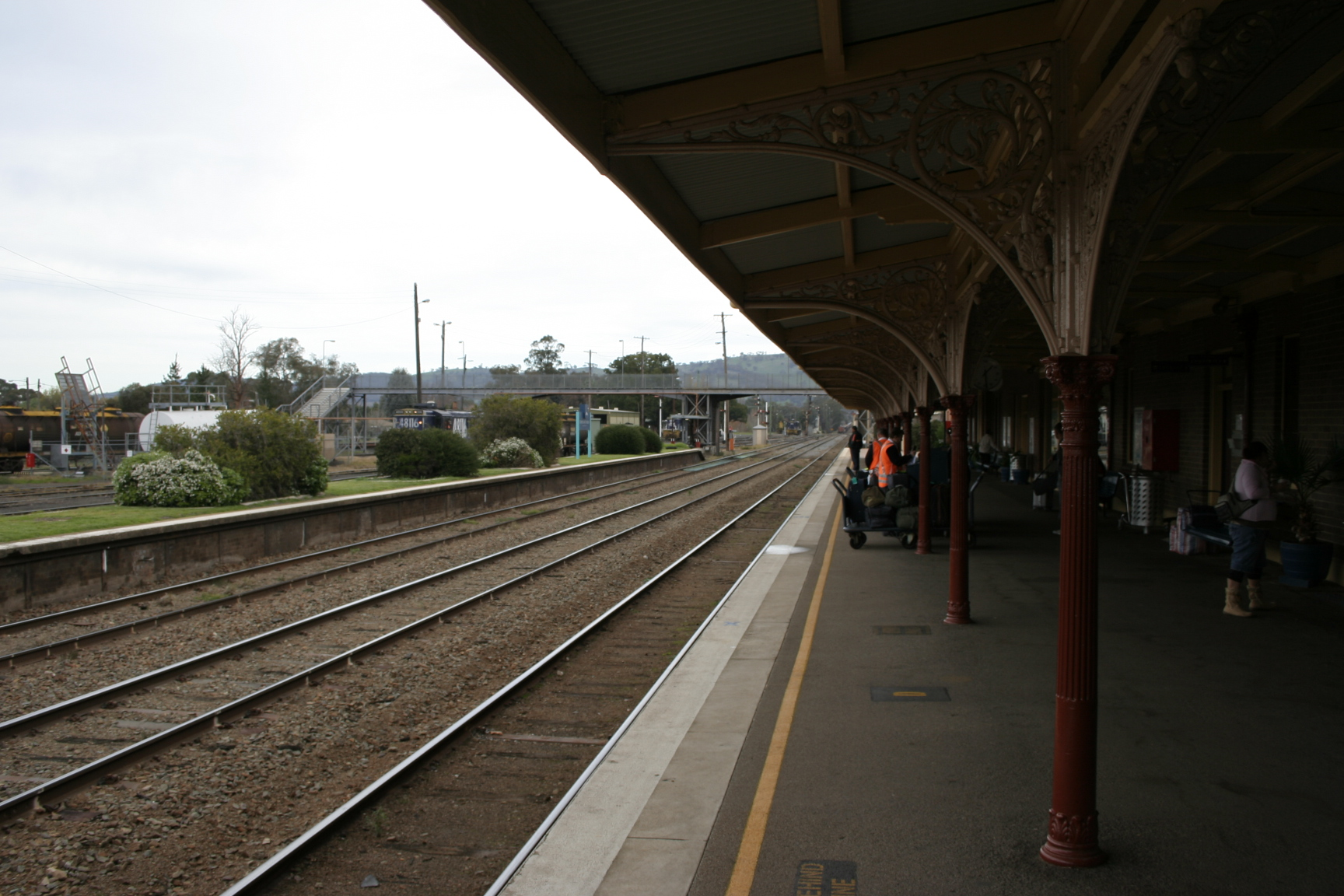
Cootamundra station

Several lines branched from the Main South, some of which are closed either fully or in part:

- The Bombala line was opened from Goulburn to Bungendore in 1885, Queanbeyan in 1887, Cooma in 1889, Nimmitabel in 1912 and Bombala in 1921. This line south of Queanbeyan served largely pastoral country and therefore it did not have any major freight traffic. The line south of Cooma closed in 1986 and south of Queanbeyan in 1989.
- The Canberra line, an 8 km (5.0 mi) branch line from Queanbeyan to Canberra, was opened in 1914. A 34 km (21 mi) branch line from Bungendore to Captains Flat was opened in 1940 and closed in 1969, a few years after the closure of the local mines.
- The Crookwell line opened from Goulburn to Crookwell in 1902; it closed in 1985. The Taralga line was opened off it from a junction at Roslyn to Taralga in 1926; it closed in 1957.
- The Yass Tramway, a 5 km (3.1 mi)-long line between Yass Junction and Yass, opened in 1892 and closed in 1989.
- The Burrinjuck Tramway was a 2 ft (610 mm) gauge line which was built in about 1907 from Goondah (between Bowning and Binalong) to Burrinjuck for the construction of the Burrinjuck Dam and closed in 1929, following the completion of construction.
- The Boorowa line was opened from Galong to Boorowa in 1915 and closed in 1987.
- The Demondrille to Blayney line opened between Demondrille (6 km (3.7 mi) south of Harden) and Young in 1885, and extended to Cowra in 1886 and Blayney on the Main Western line in 1888. It closed in August 2009.
- The Grenfell line was built from Koorawatha Junction (31 km (19 mi) south of Cowra) to Grenfell in 1901. This line is now closed. A branch was built from Cowra to Canowindra in 1910 and Eugowra in 1922, but is now closed.
- The Lake Cargelligo line opened from Cootamundra to Stockinbingal and Temora in 1893, Barmedman and Wyalong in 1903, and West Wyalong, Ungarie and Lake Cargelligo in 1917.
- The Potts Hill line branched off just north of Regents Park and served the pumping station at the Potts Hill Reservoirs. It opened in 1912 and closed in 1966.
- The Stockinbingal to Parkes line was completed from Stockinbingal to Caragabal in 1916 and Forbes in 1918, and is now part of the main route for freight trains between Sydney and Perth.
- The Temora–Roto line was completed from Temora to Barellan in 1908, Griffith in 1916, Hillston in 1923 and the Broken Hill line at Roto in 1931. The line between Hillston and Roto was closed in 1986.
- The Rankins Springs line was completed between Barmedman to Rankins Springs in 1923. By 2004, the line had been "mothballed".
- The Tumut line was completed from Cootamundra to Gundagai in 1886 and extended to Tumut in 1903, and a branch from it was built to Batlow and Kunama in 1923. The line south of Batlow was closed in 1957 and the rest closed after flood damage in 1984.
- The Hay line was completed from Junee to Narrandera, Yanco and Wilbriggie in 1881 and Hay in 1882. The line west of Wilbriggie was closed in 1985.
- The Tocumwal line was completed from Narrandera to Jerilderie in 1884 and Finley and Tocumwal in 1898. The broad gauge Victorian Railways line from Shepparton was extended to Tocumwal in 1908 creating a break-of-gauge interchange. The branch from Narrandera to Tocumwal closed in the 1980s, although proposed for reopening as part of an inland route between Mangalore, Parkes, Toowoomba and Brisbane.
- The Yanco-Griffith connection was completed between Yanco and Griffith on the line between Cootamundra, Hillston and Roto in 1922. This line is still served by one passenger train per week.
- The Tumbarumba line was completed from Wagga Wagga to Tarcutta in 1917 and Tumbarumba in 1921. It climbed the foothills of the Australian Alps, but was expensive to maintain and did not have the grain traffic that supported the westerly branches. It closed in 1974.
- The Kywong line opened from Uranquinty to Kywong in 1929 and closed in 1975.
- The Oaklands line opened from The Rock to Lockhart in 1901 and Oaklands in 1912. The broad gauge Victorian Railways line from Benalla was extended to Oaklands in 1938 creating a break-of-gauge interchange. The line has been closed beyond Boree Creek.
- The Westby line opened from The Rock to Westby in 1925 and closed in 1956.
- The Rand line opened from Henty to Rand in 1920.
- The Holbrook line was a short line which opened from Culcairn to Holbrook in 1902 and closed in the 1980s.
- The Corowa line opened from Culcairn to Corowa in 1892 and closed in the 1990s.

== Passenger services ==
=== Commuter services ===
Sydney Trains operates electric commuter passenger trains between Sydney and Macarthur. The section between Macarthur and Glenfield is operated as part of the T8 Airport & South Line, the section between Glenfield and Granville along the Old Main South line is operated as part of the T2 Leppington & Inner West Line, and the section between Liverpool and Lidcombe via Regents Park is operated as part of the T3 Liverpool & Inner West Line.

NSW TrainLink diesel railcars operate south from Campbelltown to Goulburn on an irregular frequency as part of the Southern Highlands Line.

=== Country services ===
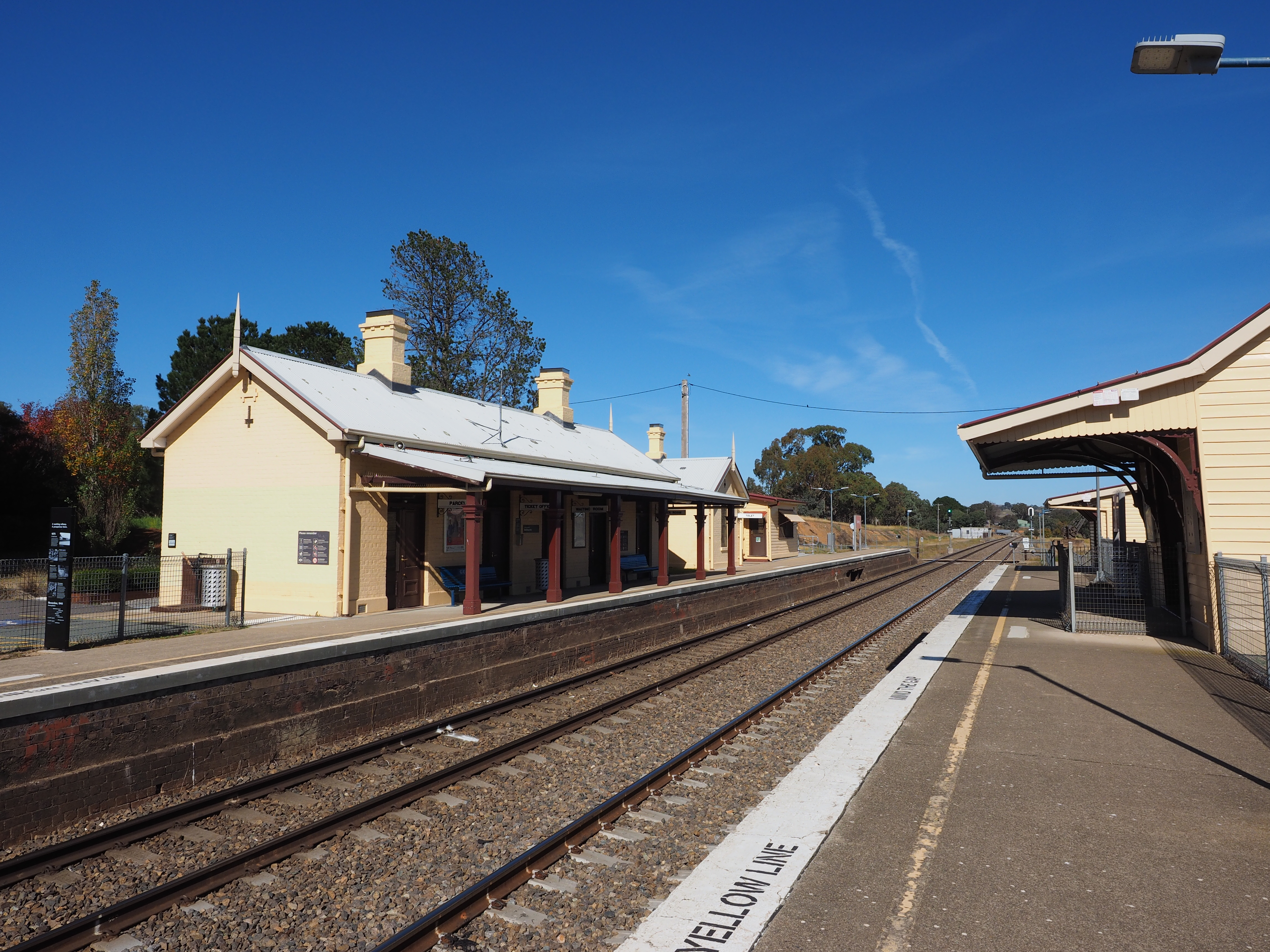
The Main Southern line tracks at Gunning railway station

Prior to 1962, travelling south of Albury into Victoria required a change of trains (due to gauge differences between NSW and Victoria) and often an overnight stay. From March 1956, a daylight connection was introduced between Sydney and Melbourne whereby a train from Sydney connected at Albury with a train to Melbourne and vice versa. In 1962, an additional Standard Gauge track was built from Albury to Melbourne alongside the existing Broad Gauge line, allowing through operation of trains between Sydney and Melbourne. Between April 1962 and August 1991, the Main South was served by the Intercapital Daylight, a locomotive hauled limited stop passenger train. It was operated jointly by the New South Wales Government Railways and the Victorian Railways with the former's air-conditioned rolling stock. Two overnight services also ran, the limited stops Southern Aurora and the Spirit of Progress. Until 1982, locomotives were exchanged at Albury for a locomotive of the respective state that the train was entering.

The South Mail operated overnight between Sydney and Albury until it ceased in June 1985. In August 1986, the Southern Aurora and the Spirit of Progress were merged into the Sydney/Melbourne Express. In August 1991, airline deregulation and falling patronage saw the Intercapital Daylight replaced by a coach service between Melbourne and Albury, connecting with the Riverina XPT at Albury. In November 1993 the delivery of additional XPT rollingstock saw the introduction of a through overnight XPT service between Sydney and Melbourne, replacing the Sydney/Melbourne Express, and the Riverina XPT extended to Melbourne from December 1994.

In 2013, with the upgrading of the East Hills line, regional trains heading southwest to Canberra, Griffith and Melbourne from Sydney Central began to use that line to travel through metropolitan Sydney, instead of the Main Southern line through Strathfield railway station.

As at October 2019, NSW TrainLink services operated on the Main South line were:

- Sydney to Canberra – 3 in each direction per day
- Sydney to Griffith – 2 in each direction per week
- Sydney to Melbourne – 2 in each direction per day
