= Murrays Flats railway station =

Former railway station in New South Wales, Australia

Murrays Flats

General information
- Location: Murrays Flats, New South Wales; Australia
- Coordinates: 34°43′26″S 149°47′11″E
- Operator: Public Transport Commission
- Line: Main South line
- Distance: 216.430 km from Central
- Platforms: 2 (2 side)
- Tracks: 2

Construction
- Structure type: Ground

Other information
- Status: Demolished

History
- Opened: 1888
- Closed: 22 March 1975

Services
Preceding station	Former services	Following station
North Goulburn towards Albury	Main Southern Line	Towrang towards Sydney
Location

Murrays Flats railway station was a railway station on the Main South railway line, serving the locality of Murrays Flats in New South Wales, Australia. It opened in 1888 and closed to passenger services in 1975.

After the outbreak of World War II, storage of surplus wheat was organised with multiple sidings constructed on the north side of Murrays Flats and on the south side of the line west of Yarra, south west Goulburn. Both sets of sidings were removed after better storage solutions were built using silos.

After closure, Murrays Flats station was later demolished and no trace of the station remains extant.
