= Kenmore railway station =

Former railway station in New South Wales, Australia

Kenmore

General information
- Location: Goulburn, New South Wales; Australia
- Coordinates: 34°43′23″S 149°44′43″E
- Operator: Public Transport Commission
- Line: Crookwell
- Distance: 229.950 kilometres from Central
- Platforms: 1
- Tracks: 2

Construction
- Structure type: Ground

Other information
- Status: Demolished

History
- Opened: 22 April 1902
- Closed: 4 March 1975

Services
Preceding station	Former services	Following station
Norwood towards Crookwell	Crookwell Line	Argyle towards Goulburn
Location

Kenmore railway station was a railway station on the Crookwell railway line, New South Wales, Australia. The station opened in 1902 with the opening of the line, and consisted of a 100 ft platform on the down side of the line. It gained its name from Kenmore a small village in Perthshire, Scotland, and was located adjacent to Kenmore Hospital. A 275 ft loop siding was constructed with the line, subsequently shortened in 1934 to 175 ft. In 1942, and additional siding was added. Passenger services ceased in 1974, and in 1975, the station and facilities closed and the platform was subsequently demolished. The line closed to goods traffic in 1984. The closed rail-line and loop remain in-situ.
