= Taralga railway line =

Former railway line in New South Wales

Taralga Line
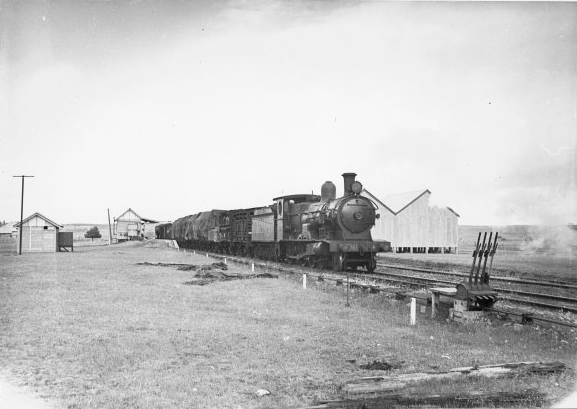
- 3361 with a mixed train at Taralga, 1946

Overview
- Other name(s): Taralga Branch
- Status: Closed
- Termini: Roslyn; Taralga
- Stations: 6

Service
- Operator(s): Department of Railways

History
- Opened: 23 February 1926
- Closed: 1 May 1957

Technical
- Line length: 25.30 km (15.72 mi)
- Number of tracks: 1
- Track gauge: 1,435 mm (4 ft 8 1/2 in)

The Taralga railway line is a disused branch railway line in the south of New South Wales, Australia. The line commenced at Roslyn and split off the Crookwell railway line to then run to the small town of Taralga. The line operated between 1926 and 1957 and is one of few lines in New South Wales that has been formally closed by an act of parliament. Today all track has been lifted and little trace remains of the infrastructure associated with the line.

== History ==
Demand for a railway line to Taralga existed from the mid-19th century. The town grew significantly in the 1860s, however remained isolated particularly during wet weather, when the poor quality roads in the region could become impassable. A railway connection was seen as highly desirable if the town was to continue to prosper. In 1884, a delegation met with the Minister for Public Works requesting a survey be conducted of a potential route between Roslyn and Taralga, branching off the already surveyed Goulburn to Crookwell route, offering that any private land that would need to be resumed would be given to the Government to facilitate construction. It was not until 1915 that construction of the line by the Department of Public Works was authorised through the passing of the Roslyn to Taralga Railway Act (1915) No 49, at an estimated cost of £87,353.

The Premier of New South Wales, Sir George Fuller turned the first sod on 8 January 1923, following delays due to World War I, which led to the estimated cost of construction rising to £139,700, part of which would be subsidised by charging higher rates for transporting goods on the line compared to the rest of the New South Wales Government Railways. and construction of the branch commenced, opening on 23 February 1926.

Initial services consisted of a mixed train running three days per week between Roslyn and Taralga, a journey taking an hour and fifteen minutes that was timetabled to allow connections onward to Goulburn and Sydney. This soon became a daily service, however by 1930 it was cut back to twice a week due to a lack of traffic, with additional services operating only when demand required. The line was never profitable as traffic fell further and was formally closed on 1 May 1957, however the last train ran on the line in 1954. Typical goods carried on the line prior to its closure included livestock, wool and potatoes. The tracks were lifted and removed by 1959, and very little infrastructure remains except for the former station building and platforms at Strathaird.
