= North Goulburn railway station =

Former railway station in New South Wales, Australia

North Goulburn
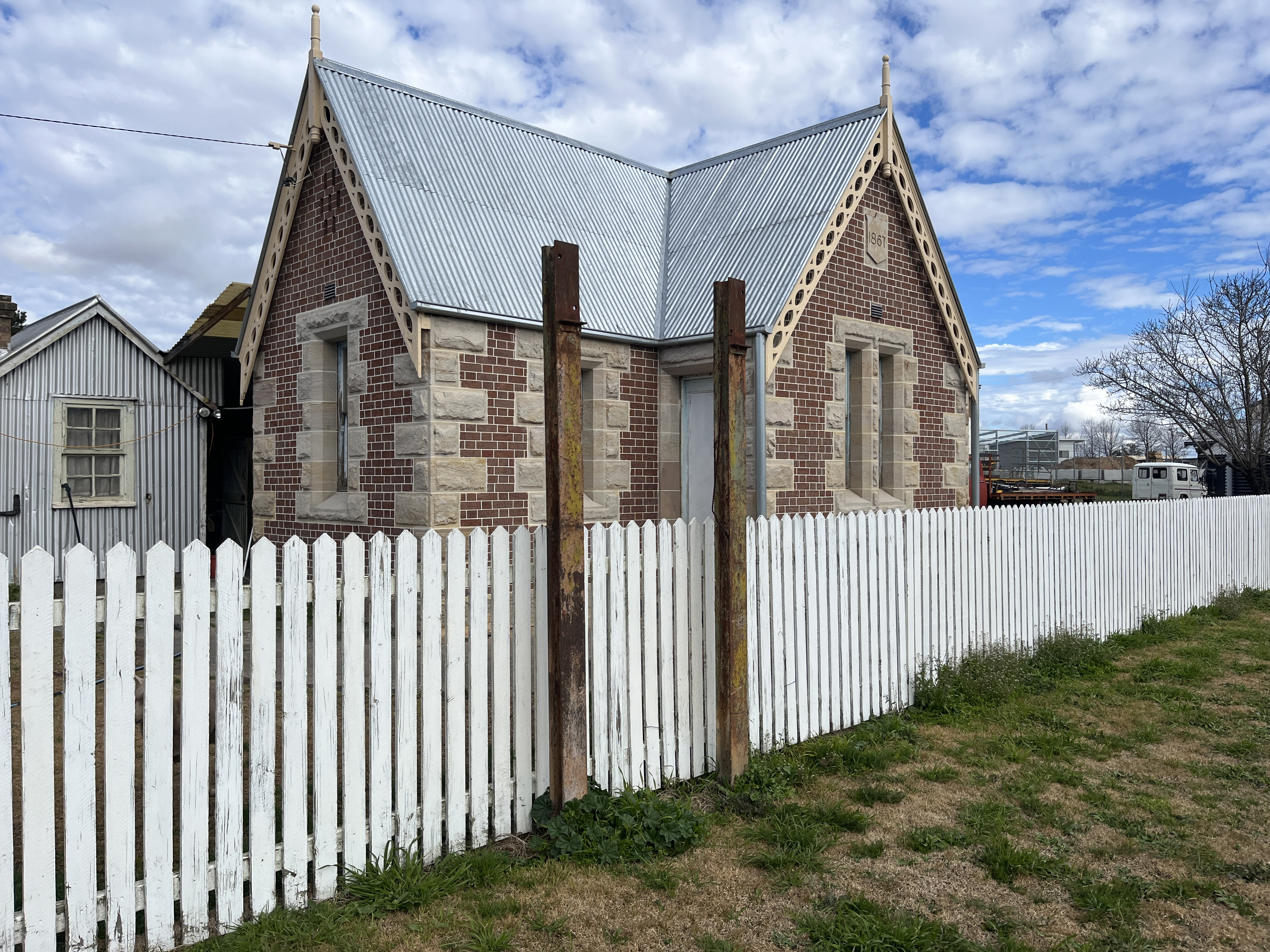
- View of the former station building and supports for the station nameboard in July 2024.

General information
- Location: Day Street, Goulburn; New South Wales; Australia
- Coordinates: 34°44′50″S 149°44′27″E
- Operator: Public Transport Commission
- Line: Main Southern line
- Distance: 222.460 km from Central
- Platforms: 1 (1 side)
- Tracks: 2

Construction
- Structure type: Ground

Other information
- Status: Closed

History
- Opened: 1882
- Closed: 9 March 1975

Services
Preceding station	Former services	Following station
Goulburn towards Albury	Main Southern Line	Murrays Flats towards Sydney
Location

North Goulburn railway station was a regional railway station located on the Main Southern line, serving the Southern Tablelands city of Goulburn. It was one of two railway stations serving the city, the other being Goulburn railway station.

== History ==
North Goulburn station opened in 1882 and closed to passenger services in 1975. While no longer a railway station, the privately owned red brick and sandstone Gatekeeper's cottage built in 1867, weatherboard signal box and platform all survive in good condition.

== Gallery ==
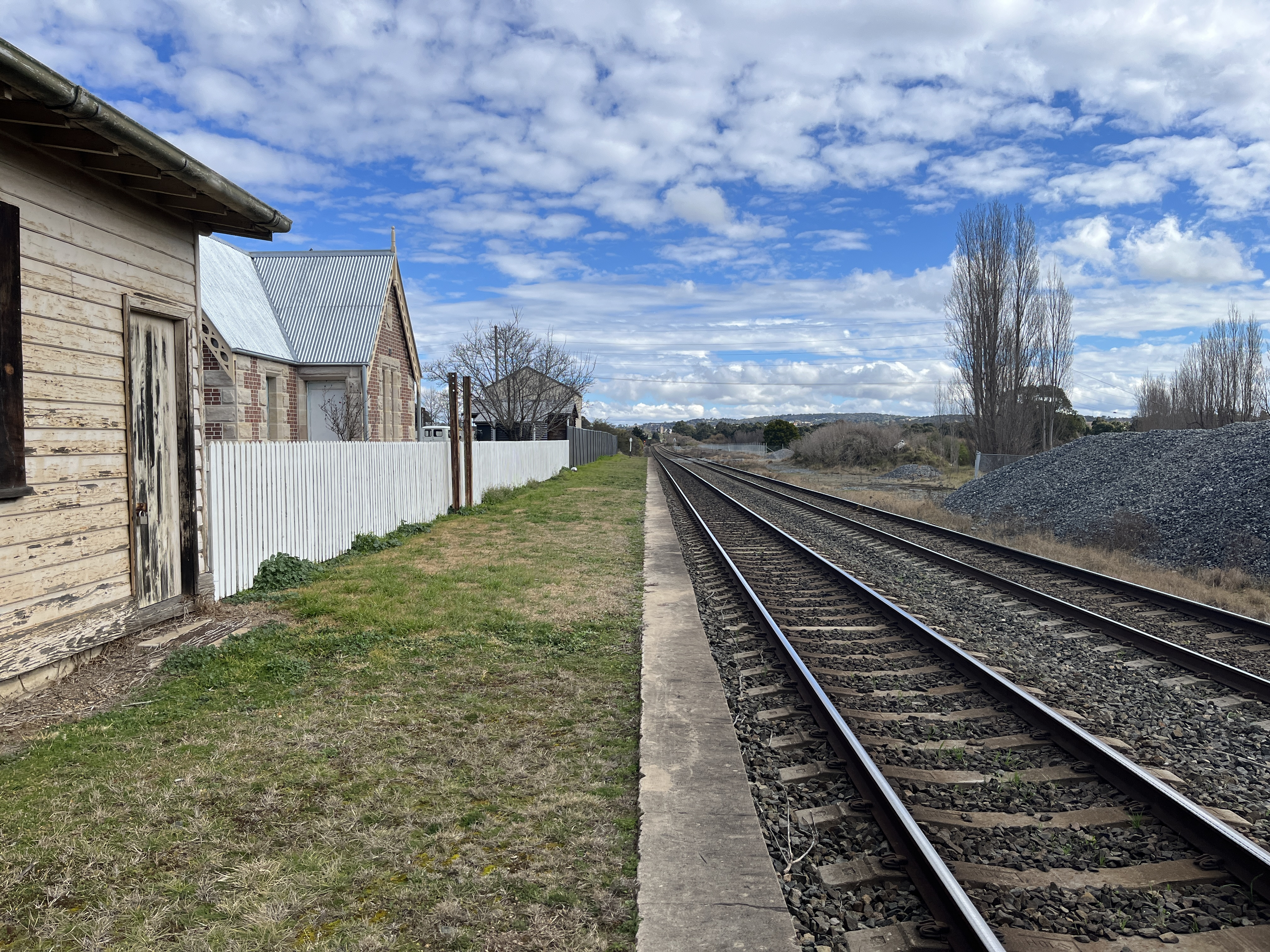
Southbound view from the platform with the station building on the left.

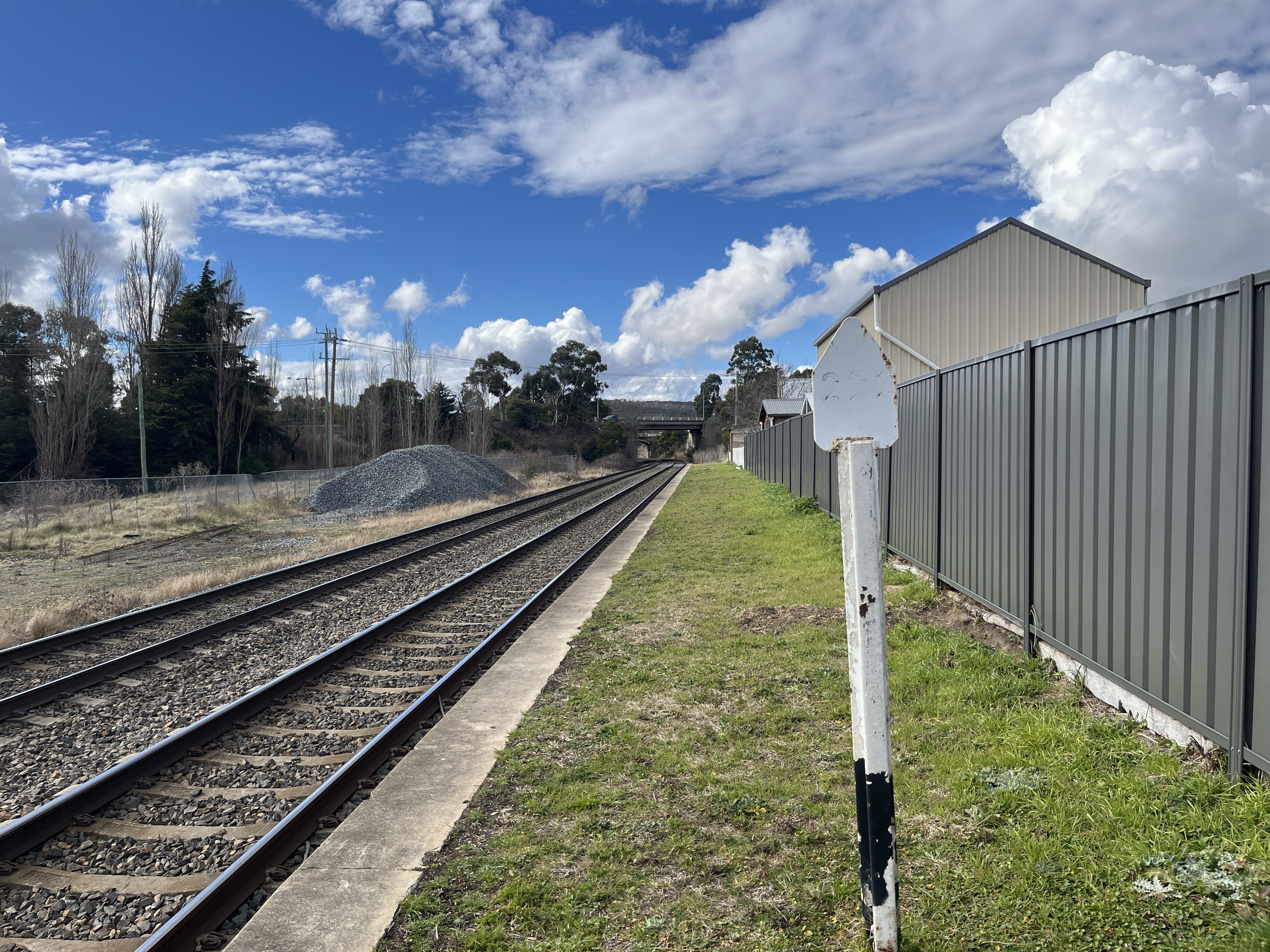
Northbound view from the platform with a kilometre post in the foreground.
