= Goulburn railway station =

Railway station in New South Wales, Australia

Goulburn
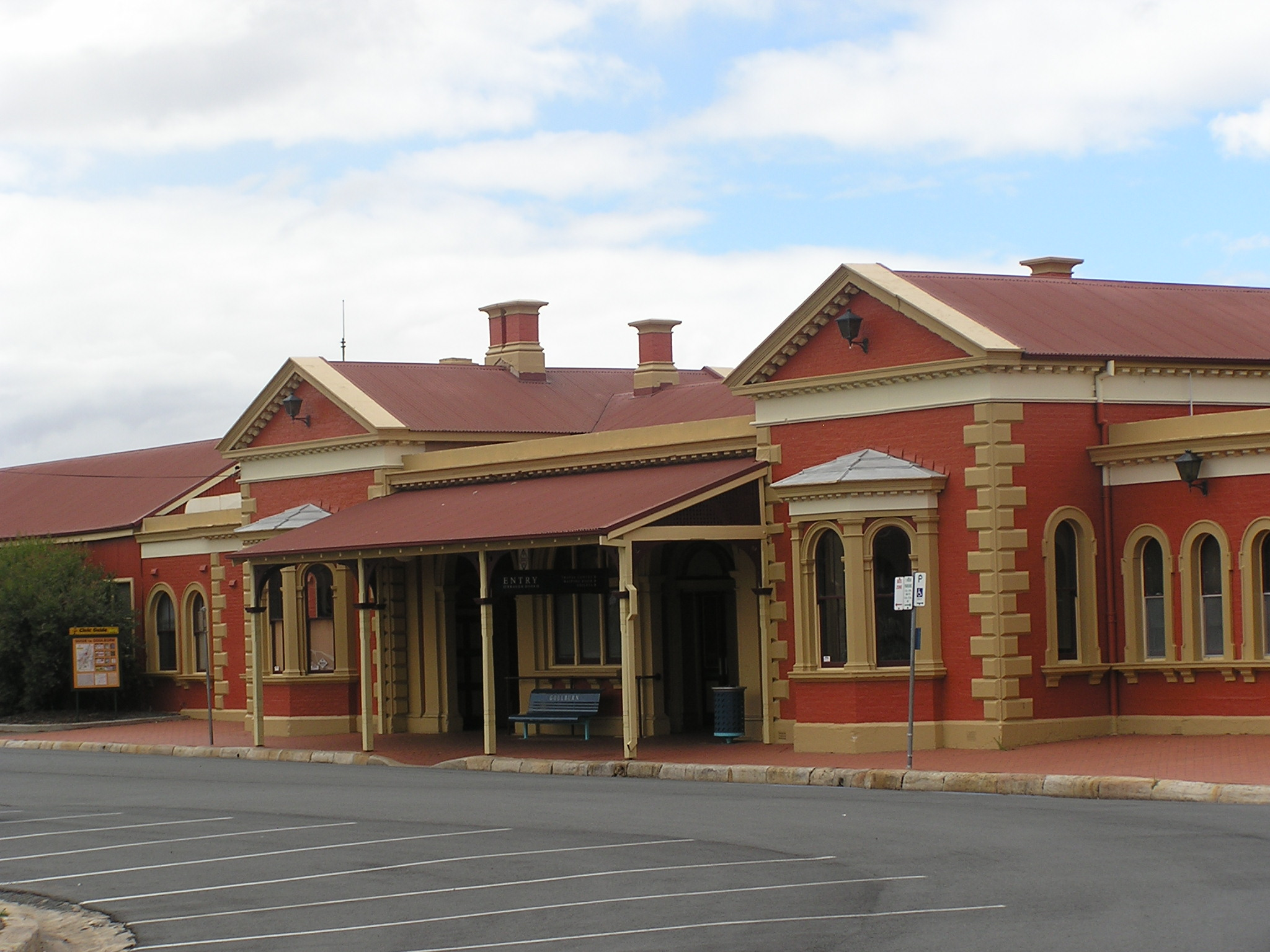
- Station building and entrance, March 2006

General information
- Location: Sloane Street, Goulburn; New South Wales; Australia
- Coordinates: 34°45′30″S 149°43′10″E
- Elevation: 635 metres (2,083 ft)
- Owner: Transport Asset Manager of New South Wales
- Operator: NSW TrainLink and Sydney Trains
- Line: Main Southern
- Distance: 224.9 km (139.7 mi) from Central via Granville; 215.0 km (133.6 mi) via East Hills
- Platforms: 3 (1 side, 1 island)
- Tracks: 3

Construction
- Structure type: Ground
- Accessible: Partial (platform 1 only, which is normally used by all passenger services)

Other information
- Status: Weekdays: Staffed: 3.30am to 12.00am: Weekends and public holidays: Staffed: 3.30am to 12.00am
- Station code: GUL
- Website: Transport for NSW

History
- Opened: 19 May 1869 (157 years ago)

Passengers
- 2023: 20,950 (year); 57 (daily) (Sydney Trains, NSW TrainLink)

Services
| Preceding station | Intercity Trains | Following station |
|---|---|---|
| Terminus | Southern Highlands Line | Marulan towards Central |
| Preceding station | NSW TrainLink | Following station |
| Tarago towards Canberra | NSW TrainLink Southern Line Canberra Xplorer | Bundanoon towards Sydney |
| Gunning towards Griffith | NSW TrainLink Southern Line Griffith Xplorer | Bundanoon towards Sydney |
| Gunning towards Melbourne | NSW TrainLink Southern Line Melbourne XPT | Moss Vale towards Sydney |
Former services
| Preceding station | Former services | Following station |
|---|---|---|
| Yarra towards Albury | Main Southern Line (1882–1975) | North Goulburn towards Sydney |
| Tirranna towards Bombala | Bombala Line (1906–1941) | Terminus |
| Komungla towards Bombala | Bombala Line (1941–1971) | Terminus |
| Argyle towards Crookwell | Crookwell Line (1902–1969) | Terminus |
| Kenmore towards Crookwell | Crookwell Line (1969–1975) | Terminus |
Location

Goulburn railway station is a heritage-listed railway station located on the Main Southern line, serving the Southern Tablelands city of Goulburn. Opened on 19 May 1869, it was added to the New South Wales State Heritage Register on 2 April 1999.

Goulburn Station is operated by NSW TrainLink, and has several train and coach services to destinations including Canberra, Albury, Melbourne, Griffith, Moss Vale, Campbelltown and Sydney.

== History ==
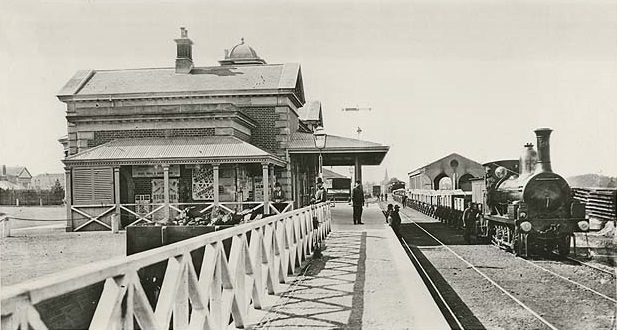
The station c.1879

The foundation stone for the main station building was laid by the Mayor of Goulburn, William Davies, on 12 May 1868. At the time, the explorer William Hovell lived immediately opposite the main station building on Sloane Street. The land on which the station buildings are sited was originally designated for public parkland.

The station buildings were opened in 1869 with arrival of the railway from Sydney, which was opened by the Governor Lord Belmore (an event commemorated by Belmore Park in the centre of the city), along with the completion of the line from Sydney to Albury in 1881 (and the connection with Victorian Railways in 1883), was a boom to the town. Later branchlines were constructed to Cooma (opened in 1889) and later extended further to Bombala, and to Crookwell and Taralga. Goulburn became a major railway centre with a roundhouse and engine servicing facilities and a factory which made pre-fabricated concrete components for signal boxes and station buildings. A large railway refreshment room opened on the island platform in 1915, closing in 1986 with the withdrawal of the Cooma Mail. A disused bay platform is located at the southern end of platform 1.

From April 1962 until March 1975, the Spirit of Progress conveyed a through car between Melbourne and Canberra, three days per week in each direction. The through carriage was detached at Goulburn and conveyed to Canberra attached to a mixed train. Until the early 1990s, Goulburn was also the terminating point for the Goulburn Day Train and Southern Highlands Express from Sydney.

== Platforms and services ==
Goulburn has one side platform and one island platform with two faces. It is serviced by early morning and evening Sydney Trains Intercity Southern Highlands Line services to and from Sydney Central, Campbelltown and Moss Vale.

During the day, it is served by one NSW TrainLink road coach service to/from Moss Vale.

It is also serviced by NSW TrainLink Xplorer and XPT long-distance services from Sydney to Canberra, Griffith and Melbourne. The Griffith Xplorer combines with the Canberra Xplorer to operate as one train between Sydney and Goulburn.

| Platform | Line | Stopping pattern | Notes |
| 1 | SHL | services to & from Moss Vale, Campbelltown & Sydney Central | |
| 1 | Southern Region | services to Canberra, Griffith, Melbourne & Sydney Central | |
| 2 | SHL | occasionally used if Platform 1 is occupied | |
| 2 | Southern Region | occasionally used if Platform 1 is occupied | |
| 3 | | not used by passenger services | |

== Description ==
The station complex includes a type 5 first-class brick station building on Platform 1, completed in 1869, and a type 11, initial island/side building of thirteen bays on the island platform 2 and 3, completed in 1915. Brick refreshment rooms, also completed in 1915, form part of the island platform station building. A brick two-storey signal box with a gable roof was completed in the 1970s.

The broader station complex included three residences and two railway barracks. The stationmaster's residence at 7 Sloane Street is a two-storey type 4 brick design. Two gatekeeper's residences – at 58 Reign Street and 1 Blackshaw Road – were type 1 design brick and stone buildings. All three residences were built in 1868. The HS railway barracks, built in brick in three pavilions, were completed c. 1880, while the standard railway barracks were built in 1891.

Other buildings in the station complex include:

- The locomotive supervisor's office (former police barracks), built in 1812
- The goods shed, a 146' x 45' corrugated iron through shed built c. 1870s
- The locomotive straight shed, a "Wellington Shed" built in Wellington in 1880 and transferred to Goulburn in 1930
- The roundhouse, built in brick and corrugated iron in 1916, including the turntable
- The per way and carriage workshops, built c. 1881

The heritage-listed complex also includes the station forecourt and plantings to Sloane Street including stone gutters, the footbridge (1894), another footbridge over the yard (1899), a water tank near the station, a water column at the south end of platform 2, a pumphouse, turntable and the Mulwaree Ponds dam.

The cedar wall panelling and timber door panels in the refreshment room and the timber train controller's desk in the area manager's office are specifically listed as artefacts in the station's heritage listing.

== Heritage listing ==
Goulburn railway precinct is of state significance as one of the earliest principal rail locations in NSW and has had continuous use as a major railway centre since the 1860s. The main station building (1869) is significant as the earliest "first class" station building constructed in NSW. The railway station is a prominent public building in Goulburn that, along with other significant railway structures in the adjacent yard, is closely associated with the development of Goulburn in the late 19th and early 20th centuries. The major railway buildings and other structures at Goulburn are integral to the history and identity of a town which has relied to a great extent on the railways for its growth and development for a large part of its history, with the railway being the major employer for much of Goulburn's history.

Other significant items within the Goulburn railway precinct include the former Station Master's residence (1869), the former Gatekeeper's residence on Blackshaw Road (c. 1869), the c. 1891 barracks, the former carriage and per way workshops (part of which remain in private ownership), and the former administrative headquarters on Sloane Street.

The Goulburn barracks building is an excellent representative example of 1890s railway barracks construction, is one of the oldest extant railway barracks in NSW, and is associated with an important historical phase in the history of NSW: the rapid development of the NSW railway network in the late 19th century. It is important as an example of a standard 19th century railway design, and along with the two residences at Goulburn, is significant as a group that collectively demonstrate the custom of providing accommodation for railway staff.

Goulburn railway station was listed on the New South Wales State Heritage Register on 2 April 1999 having satisfied the following criteria.

The place is important in demonstrating the course, or pattern, of cultural or natural history in New South Wales.

Goulburn was one of the earliest major railway centres in NSW and is therefore associated with the earliest development of railway infrastructure in regional NSW in the 1860s. The construction of the line to Goulburn was a major milestone in the development of the railways during the 19th Century and opened up the pastoral industry in this region to new markets. The 1860s station building is significant as one of the earliest first class buildings constructed in NSW, indicating the importance of Goulburn as a major railway centre in the state. The barracks building is one of the earliest extant buildings of its type constructed in NSW, and along with the two railway residences at Goulburn, is significant as a group that collectively demonstrate the custom of providing designated accommodation for railway staff. The site is significant for its collection of buildings form various periods, demonstrating continuous railway activity on the site for almost 150 years

The place has a strong or special association with a person, or group of persons, of importance of cultural or natural history of New South Wales's history.

The site is associated with John Whitton ('Father of the NSW Railways'), through his achievement in completing the trunk lines to Goulburn. The line from Picton to Goulburn via Thirlmere is one of Whitton's greatest triumphs throughout his career.

The place is important in demonstrating aesthetic characteristics and/or a high degree of creative or technical achievement in New South Wales.

The 1860s station building is a significant and imposing landmark in Goulburn which demonstrates a high level of aesthetic significance. The building is a fine example of a first-class Victorian Italianate railway building, demonstrating the importance of railway development during the earliest period of railway construction. Aspects of the main buildings of special note are the original interiors including the interior of the refreshment room.

The 1915 station building and railway refreshment rooms are significant for demonstrating a variation on a standard building type employed throughout NSW, adapted to accommodate the high level of traffic at Goulburn railway station.

Several other items within the precinct are excellent examples of their type and demonstrate technical and/or aesthetic significance, particularly the Station Master's and Gatekeeper's residences which are good examples of Victorian Gothic style domestic buildings. The roundhouse is of significance as a good example of a large scale industrial railway structure retaining much of its original fabric and form. The railway barracks building at Goulburn is aesthetically significant as an example of late 19th century standard railway architecture.

The place has strong or special association with a particular community or cultural group in New South Wales for social, cultural or spiritual reasons.

The major railway buildings at Goulburn are integral to the history and identity of the town which has relied on the railways to a large extent for its growth and prosperity, particularly in the late 19th and early 20th centuries. The depot, in particular, employed a large number of people, many of whom still live in or near Goulburn.

The place has potential to yield information that will contribute to an understanding of the cultural or natural history of New South Wales.

The site has research significance as Goulburn once contained the most comprehensive group or railway buildings outside Sydney, representing most stages of railway development and technology. Much of this infrastructure remains. The roundhouse and associated structures are maintained and interpreted by a local rail heritage group, allowing public access to the roundhouse and surrounds. The collection of residential buildings within close proximity are of research potential by providing an insight into the variety of residences used to accommodate railway staff; providing a contrast between the simple, utilitarian barracks and the grand Station Master's residence.

The place possesses uncommon, rare or endangered aspects of the cultural or natural history of New South Wales.

The site is rare as a large scale railway precinct, retaining the majority of its significant features. The Goulburn locomotive depot is rare as an excellent example of a largely intact locomotive depot in NSW, with the roundhouse being one of only seven remaining roundhouse buildings in NSW. The 1869 Gatekeeper's residence is a rare example of its type still in railway ownership and one of the earliest extant examples of its type in NSW. The footbridge is one of only a few surviving old rail truss footbridges, and is a good example of the effects of the economic constraints of the 1890s.

The place is important in demonstrating the principal characteristics of a class of cultural or natural places/environments in New South Wales.

The site has representative significance for its collection of railway structures that collectively demonstrate widespread 19th and early 20th century railway customs, activities and design in NSW, and are representative of similar items that are found in many other railway precincts across the state.

The c. 1890 barracks building is a good representative example of late 19th century barracks (rest house) design, displaying full length verandahs on two sides and other features typical of barracks design in the late 19th century.

The 1860s station building is a fine example of the first class station buildings constructed throughout major NSW towns during the 19th Century.

The 1915 station building is a good example of a standard (A8–A10) early twentieth century station design with fabric, form and details typical of many other island platform buildings of the period.
