= Crookwell railway line =

Former railway line in New South Wales

Crookwell Line
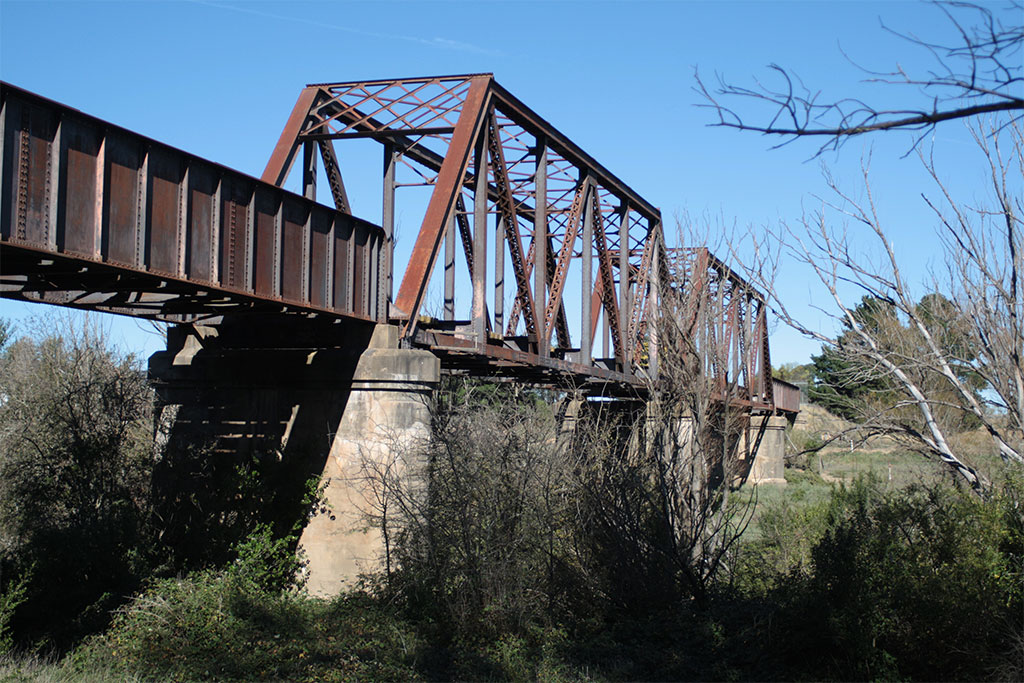
- Disused rail bridge near Goulburn North

Overview
- Status: Closed
- Termini: Goulburn; Crookwell
- Stations: 8

Service
- Operator(s): State Rail Authority

History
- Opened: 22 April 1902
- Closed: 18 September 1989

Technical
- Line length: 57.3 km (35.6 mi); 35 miles 49 chains
- Number of tracks: 1
- Track gauge: 4 ft 8 1/2 in (1,435 mm)

The Crookwell railway line is a disused branch railway line in the south of New South Wales, Australia. Although it has never officially been closed, the line has not seen services since the late 1980s. It branched from the Main South line at North Goulburn and passed north through the localities of Kenmore and Roslyn to the town of Crookwell.

== History ==
The Crookwell district north of Goulburn is rich and productive agricultural land, with a high annual rainfall. A railway to Crookwell was proposed as early as 1857, but it was not until the late 1870s and early 1880s that formal submissions were made by local residents and landowners to the Commissioner for Railways. Various routes and proposals were considered, including the option of a tramway as a feeder to the Main South railway. From 1884, public meetings were held and deputations were made, with a survey of the proposed route taking place, but not until 1899 did the NSW Parliament finally pass a Bill for the construction of the Crookwell line.

The major engineering feature was a heavy (and expensive) steel lattice bridge over the Wollondilly River to the north of Goulburn. The line then passed through rolling hills to the town of Crookwell, and was opened in 1902. A platform was provided at Argyle, near the Goulburn Training Centre (now the Goulburn Correctional Centre), and stations were built at Kenmore, Norwood, The Forest, Woodhouselee, Roslyn, McAlister and Crookwell, with sidings at each of these locations. Several intermediate sidings were provided for stock loading and similar activities.

In 1913, there was a proposal to extend the branch line further northwest to Cowra. With the advent of World War I, the proposal didn't move forward.

== Traffic ==
From opening, the line carried a mix of goods and passenger traffic. Superphosphate and livestock were the main goods carried, and superphosphate in particular was responsible for keeping the line operational long past the closure of similar branch lines. Initial passenger traffic was locomotive hauled 'mixed' trains of passenger and goods cars until the introduction of CPH railmotors from 1926. Two return daily railmotor services were provided allowing day return travel in either direction. Steam power was replaced with diesel from 1961. From the mid-1970s, goods traffic began to decline in competition with road transport. Passenger traffic ceased in 1974, and by the 1980s freight traffic had dwindled to such unprofitable levels that the last train operated in 1985. The last passenger train to operate on the line was hauled by steam locomotives 3001 and 3102 on 25 August 1985 with both being turned on Crookwell's turntable. The final train out of Crookwell was in September 1985, a 48 class locomotive hauling the last freight wagons from Crookwell yard. The points connecting the line to the Main South line at Goulburn were removed in September 1989 and the line listed as "out of use". The branchline has not been formally closed.

== Current state ==
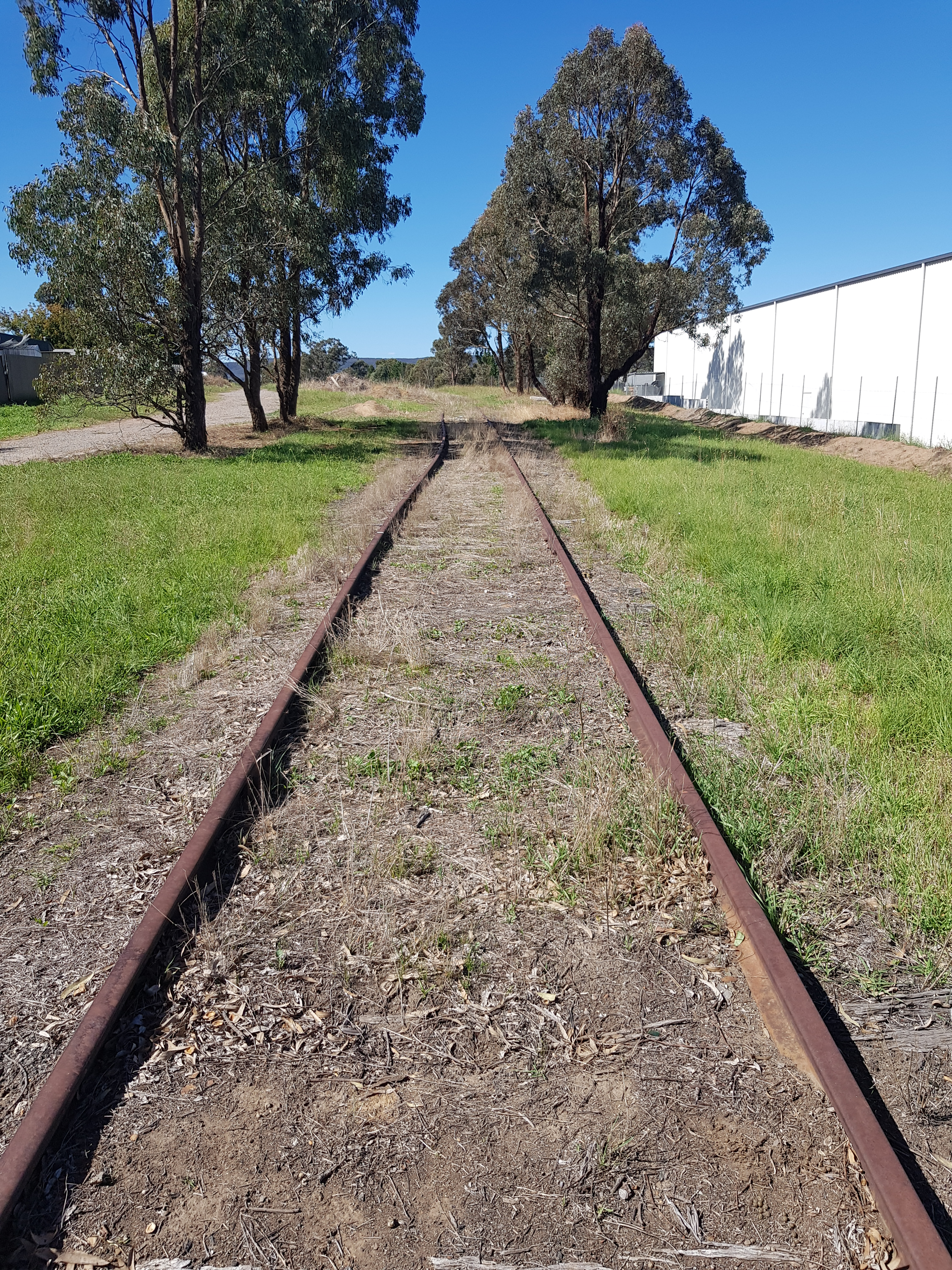
Crookwell railway line on 28 February 2021, looking north east from Ross St intersection.

Much of the alignment and track of the line remains in place, including the substantial bridge over the Wollondilly River. Since 2000 there were continuing plans to operate heritage rail trips over the line. 2020 saw a push to convert the rail corridor into a walking trail. As of 2026 neither plans have come to fruition.

== Taralga Branch ==
At Roslyn, a branch line to Taralga diverged, opening on 23 February 1926 and suspended on 1 May 1957. Whilst initially the line saw a six-days-a-week service, by the time of its demise it saw trains on Wednesdays only.

The station buildings were of concrete, similar to other stations constructed in that period. The line has been lifted and little remains of the formation. Part of the original alignment remains but has been turned into a road.
