= Crookwell railway station =

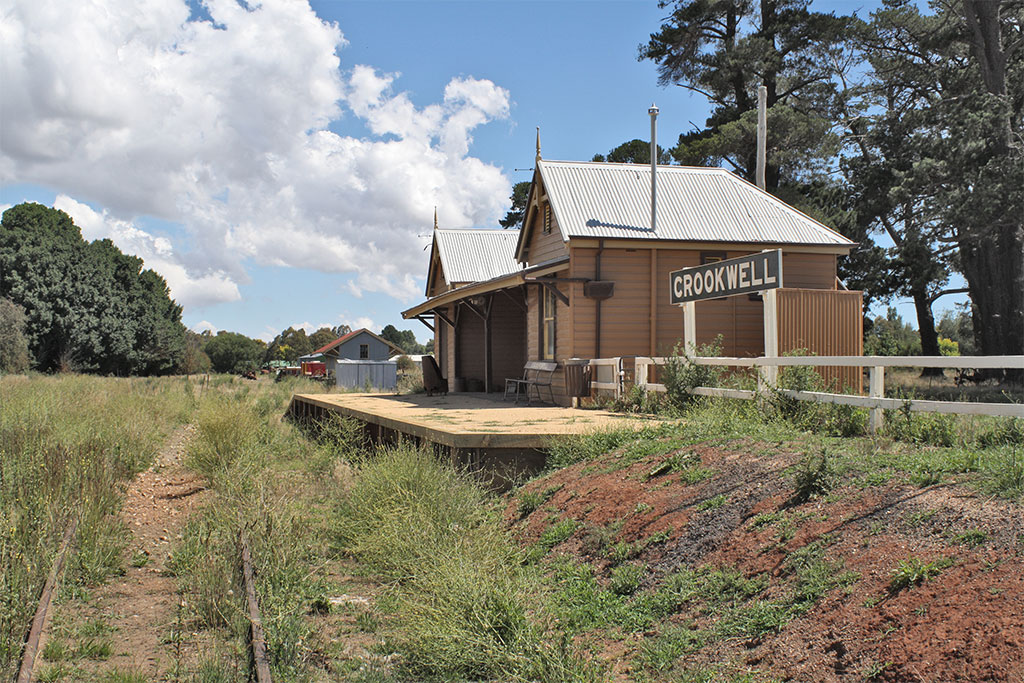
- Crookwell railway station, in 2010

- Location within New South Wales Location within Australia
- 34°27′28″S 149°28′32″E
- Location: Goulburn-Crookwell branch line, Crookwell, Upper Lachlan Shire, New South Wales, Australia

History
- Built: 1902

Site notes
- Owner: Transport for NSW

New South Wales Heritage Register
- Type: State heritage (complex / group)
- Designated: 2 April 1999
- Reference no.: 1124
- Type: Railway Platform/Station
- Category: Transport – Rail

Crookwell railway station is a heritage-listed former railway station and now functioning as a museum, at the terminus of the Goulburn-Crookwell branch line in the Southern Tablelands region of New South Wales, Australia. The property is owned by the Transport Asset Holding Entity, an agency of the Government of New South Wales. It was added to the New South Wales State Heritage Register on 2 April 1999. It is under the care of the Goulburn Crookwell Heritage Railway Inc.

== History ==
Crookwell railway station was the terminal railway station of the Crookwell branch railway line. The station opened in 1902 with the opening of the line, and consisted of a 30-metre (100 ft) platform with wooden station building on the down side of the line, a stock siding, goods siding, goods platform and a 15-metre (50 ft) turntable. Most of the facilities remain in place, including the timber station building which is well maintained. Passenger services were withdrawn in 1974, and the line and station closed to goods traffic in 1985.

== Description ==
The complex comprises a type 16, timber pioneer station building, completed in 1902; a corrugated iron lamp room, also completed in 1902; and a 18.3 by 4.6 metres (60 ft × 15 ft) corrugated iron goods shed, also completed in 1902. Other structures include timber platform faces; a Sellers 1284/3.6941 18-metre (60 ft) turntable; a T233, 5-tonne (4.9-long-ton; 5.5-short-ton) gantry crane; an 20-tonne (20-long-ton; 22-short-ton) Avery weighbridge, erected in 1902; a loading bank; and an ash pit. The heritage area includes the surrounding yard and station precinct as landscape project, together with plantings, particularly pine trees. Artefacts include basins and signs.

== Heritage listing ==
As at 24 November 2000, Crookwell railway station was a significant surviving pioneer terminus station and yard with most elements intact from the date of opening in 1902. It represents an early period of growth by the railways to areas of marginal revenue. This then was reflected in economic constraints causing a cutting back on the cost of railway construction. It is the best surviving such complex in the State and contributes to the townscape of Crookwell. The site retains its setting and significant details such as basins, signs, plantings. The line is now closed and the site re-used as an operating heritage railway and museum.

Crookwell railway station was listed on the New South Wales State Heritage Register on 2 April 1999 having satisfied the following criteria.

The place possesses uncommon, rare or endangered aspects of the cultural or natural history of New South Wales.

This item is assessed as historically rare. This item is assessed as scientifically rare. This item is assessed as arch. rare. This item is assessed as socially rare.

== See also ==
- List of disused regional railway stations in New South Wales

Preceding station	Former services	Following station
Terminus	Crookwell Line	McAlister towards Goulburn
