= Moss Vale High School =

Location
- Moss Vale, Southern Highlands, New South Wales; Australia; 34°33′10″S 150°23′07″E

Information
- Type: Government-funded co-educational comprehensive secondary day school
- Motto: Truth and Honour
- Established: 1963; 63 years ago
- School district: Wollondilly; Regional South
- Educational authority: New South Wales Department of Education
- Principal: Patrica Holmes
- Teaching staff: 54.9 FTE (2018)
- Years: 7–12
- Enrolment: 647 (2018)
- Campus type: Regional
- Colours: Navy blue, red and white
- Slogan: Respectful, Responsible, Safe.
- Website: mossvale-h.schools.nsw.gov.au

Moss Vale High School is a government-funded co-educational comprehensive secondary day school, located in Moss Vale, a town in the Southern Highlands region of New South Wales, Australia.

Established in 1963, the school enrolled approximately 650 students in 2018, from Year 7 to Year 12; six percent identified as Indigenous Australians and six percent were from a language background other than English. The school is operated by the NSW Department of Education; the principal is Patricia Holmes, and deputy principals are Matthew Carlyon and Helen Campbell.

== Overview ==
The school's catchment area is drawn from the towns of Moss Vale, Bundanoon and Robertson; and the villages of Burrawang, Avoca, Wildes Meadow and Fitzroy Falls, Sutton Forest, Exeter, Penrose and Wingello, and surrounding rural areas.

== Notable alumni ==
- Darren Beadman – horse racing jockey
- Nathan Hindmarsh – rugby league player

== Sports and Traditions ==
Moss Vale high has a long running tradition of splitting students into four 'houses'. These Houses are colour coded with Carrington(red), Belmore(yellow), Gibraltar(blue) and Morton(green). The house groups compete against each other by accumulating points, where the winner, the house with the most points, is announced at the end of the year.

== See also ==
- List of government schools in New South Wales
- Education in Australia
