= Glenquarry, New South Wales =

Glenquarry
- Town
- Coordinates: 34°32′S 150°30′E
- Country: Australia
- State: New South Wales
- Region: Southern Highlands
- LGA: Wingecarribee Shire
- Location: 134 km (83 mi) SW of Sydney CBD; 7 km (4.3 mi) SE of Bowral; 16 km (9.9 mi) NW of Robertson

Government
  - State electorate: Goulburn
  - Federal division: Whitlam
- Elevation: 762 m (2,500 ft)

Population
  - Total: 261 (SAL 2021)
- Postcode: 2576
- County: Camden
- Parish: Yarrunga, Mittagong, Kangaloon
Localities around Glenquarry
Bowral	Mittagong	Mount Lindsey
Moss Vale	Glenquarry	Kangaloon
Moss Vale	Avoca	Burrawang

Glenquarry (/ɡlɛnkwɒri/) is a locality in the Southern Highlands of New South Wales, Australia, in Wingecarribee Shire. It is a scattered village on the banks of the Wingecarribee River.

== Population ==
At the 2016 census, it had a population of 222. According to the 2021 census, there were 261 people living at Glenquarry.
