= Woodlands, New South Wales =

Woodlands
- Town
- Coordinates: 34°25′S 150°23′E
- Country: Australia
- State: New South Wales
- Region: Southern Highlands
- LGA: Wingecarribee Shire
- Location: 124 km (77 mi) SW of Sydney; 7 km (4.3 mi) WNW of Mittagong; 86 km (53 mi) ENE of Goulburn

Government
  - State electorate: Goulburn
  - Federal division: Whitlam
- Elevation: 698 m (2,290 ft)

Population
  - Total: 294 (SAL 2021)
- Postcode: 2575
- County: Camden
- Parish: Kangaloon
Localities around Woodlands
		Welby
Mandemar	Woodlands	Mittagong
Joadja	Berrima	Bowral

Woodlands is a small village situated at the T-intersection of Wombeyan Caves Road and Spring Hill Road in the Southern Highlands of New South Wales, Australia, in Wingecarribee Shire.

According to the 2016 census, Woodlands had a population of 272. At the 2021 census, there were 294 residents.
