= High Range, New South Wales =

High Range
- Town
- Coordinates: 34°22′S 150°18′E
- Country: Australia
- State: New South Wales
- Region: Southern Highlands
- LGA: Wingecarribee Shire
- Location: 131 km (81 mi) SW of Sydney; 18 km (11 mi) WNW of Mittagong; 87 km (54 mi) NE of Goulburn

Government
  - State electorate: Goulburn
  - Federal division: Whitlam
- Elevation: 724 m (2,375 ft)

Population
  - Total: 497 (SAL 2021)
- Postcode: 2575
- County: Camden
- Parish: Berrima, Jellore, Joadja, Wanganderry
Localities around High Range
| Blue Mountains National Park | Blue Mountains National Park | Wattle Ridge |
| Bullio | High Range | Colo Vale |
| Joadja | Mandemar | Woodlands |

High Range is a locality located in the Southern Highlands of New South Wales, Australia near Bowral and Mittagong. The village is centred just off the Wombeyan Caves Road 55 kilometres (34 mi) east of the Wombeyan Caves. High Range has a church (St Thomas), a rural fire station, a bus stop and a cricket pitch.

The "High Range" itself is an 827-metre (2,713 ft) hill about 2 kilometres (1.2 mi) to the NE.

High Range is about 720 metres (2,360 ft) above sea level and receives about 740 millimetres (29 in) of rain per year. It is 100 kilometres (62 mi) south west of Sydney and 70 kilometres (43 mi) south from Katoomba. It is a rural area with a number of vineyards.

== Population ==
At the 2016 census, there were 394 people living at High Range. At the 2021 census, the population was 497.

== See also ==
- Taralga
