= Wingecarribee Swamp =

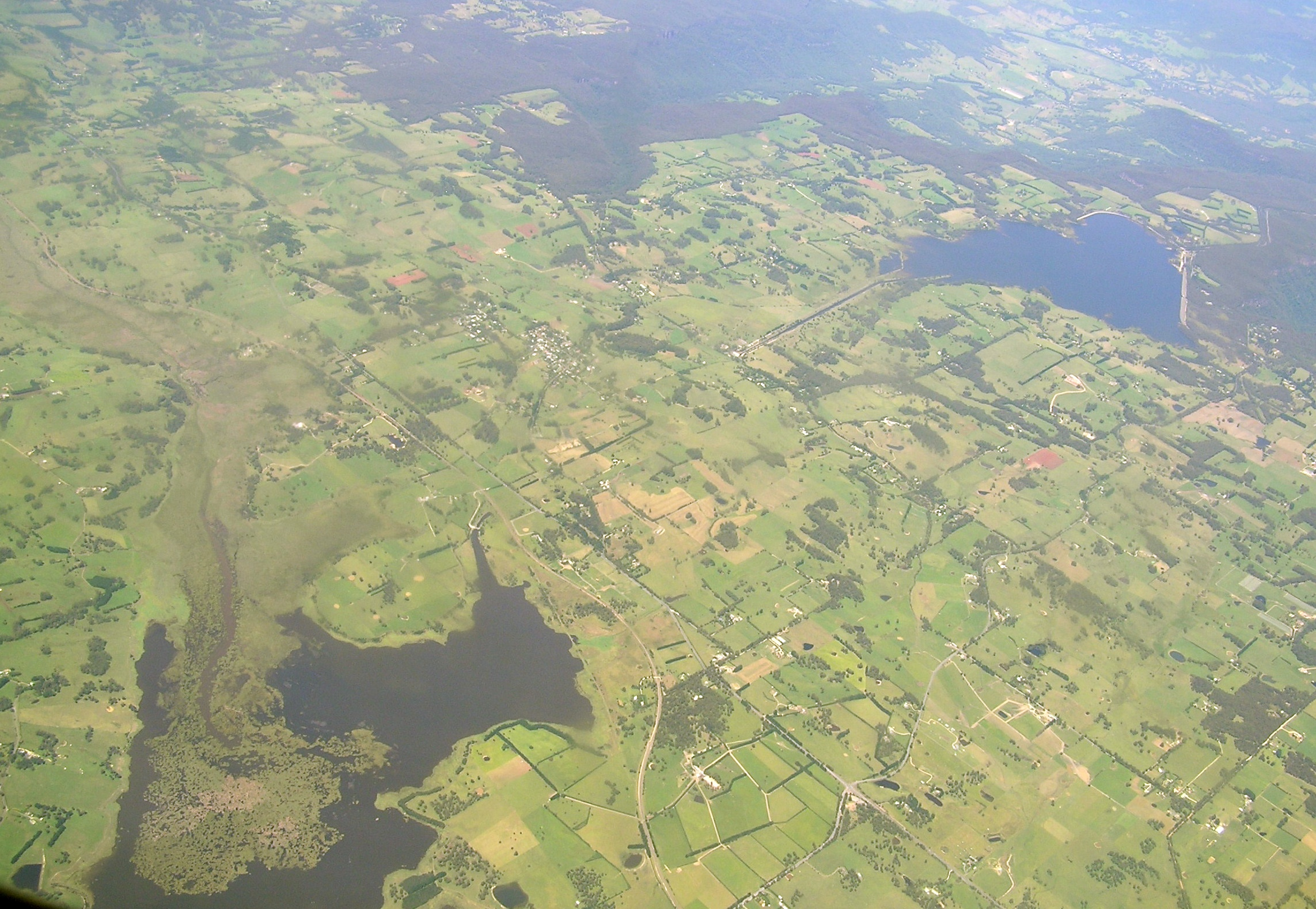
- Wingecarribee Swamp and Fitzroy Reservoir

- Location within New South Wales Location within Australia
- 34.5760°S 150.5284°E
- Location: Illawarra Highway, Robertson, Wingecarribee Shire, New South Wales, Australia

Site notes
- Owner: Water NSW

New South Wales Heritage Register
- Official name: Wingecarribee Swamp
- Type: state heritage (landscape)
- Designated: 2 April 1999
- Reference no.: 784
- Type: Wetland or river
- Category: Landscape - Natural

Wingecarribee Swamp is a heritage-listed wetland at Illawarra Highway, Robertson, Wingecarribee Shire, New South Wales, Australia. It was added to the New South Wales State Heritage Register on 2 April 1999. It is also listed on the Directory of Important Wetlands in Australia and the former Register of the National Estate.

== History ==
A natural site, Wingecarribee Swamp is a remnant of a late glacial swamp overlying the Triassic sandstone and Wianamatta Shale of the Southern Highlands. The wetlands' peat deposits provide a rare resource for scientific study but are also sought after as a mining resource.

The Wingecarribee Swamp covers 340 ha (840 acres) and is over 5000 years old. It is listed as an Endangered Ecological Community at both State and Federal levels and contains four threatened species: the plants Lysimachia vulgaris var. davurica (yellow loosestrife); Gentiana wingecarribiensis (Wingecarribee gentian) and Prasophyllum uroglossum (leek orchid) and one insect, Petalura gigantea (giant dragonfly). The adjacent Wingecarribee Reservoir plays a pivotal role in the water supply system as water from Tallowa Dam is pumped up to Wingecarribee Reservoir and then can be diverted to Warragamba Dam or Nepean Dam.

The swamp has a history of disturbance with a portion being partly inundated with the construction of the Wingecarribee Reservoir in 1974. It was grazed for many years and had been burned frequently to provide green pick for cattle. It was also mined for peat.

In August 1998 the swamp partially collapsed into the reservoir. The collapse cannot be attributed to any one factor but a high rainfall event coupled with instability, as a result of peat mining, and low reservoir levels at the time of the collapse, may have contributed. Spontaneous bog bursts have been documented from time to time in the Northern Hemisphere.

Following the swamp's collapse, its geomorphology changed dramatically, the peat fractured and a major channel was formed on its northern side. The vegetation was highly disturbed and bare peat was exposed. Turbidity (cloudiness) in the adjoining reservoir was over 300 NTU. A few months later willows (Salix sp.) growing on the margin of the swamp seeded and there was an explosion of willow seedlings germinating in the nutrient-rich bare peat.

The level of disturbance suffered by the swamp is too great to consider restoration as a feasible option for action, however management is focused on the values the swamp still retains.

The swamp is now referred to by its post-collapse landform units: the intact, drying fissured channel and delta areas. The fissured areas have had a great deal of damage, while the delta - the mass of peat expelled into the reservoir - seems to be developing an ecological value in its own right. The delta area closest to the swamp is fairly stable, whereas the front rises and falls with the reservoir level but does not move laterally.

== Description ==
The swamp is in the Southern Highlands, backing on the Wingecarribee Reservoir (to its west) and forming the headwaters of the Wingecarribee River.

Wingecarribee Swamp forms the main headwaters of the Wingecarribee River which is a tributary of the Wollondilly River. It exists now as a remnant of what was probably a larger late glacial swamp overlying the Permian sandstone and wianamatta shale, and now mostly removed by the combined rejuvenation of the Wollondilly, Nepean and lower Shoalhaven catchments resulting from the last uplift of the sandstone plateau. Only Wingecarribee Swamp has survived intact, by reason of an unusual combination of geomorphic phenomena: it is surrounded on the north, east and south by low basalt hills which protect it from capture by tributaries of the Nepean River and Shoalhaven River, leaving a small outlet to the west into the gently west-dipping Wollondilly catchment. The swamp contains a rich assemblage of water and bog plants. Perched water table and impeded drainage has resulted in the development of a deep acid peat swamp of late glacial age.

The swamp is the largest peatland in montane Mainland Australia with an area of about 7 square kilometres (2.7 sq mi), an average depth of fibrous and humic peat of around 3 m (9.8 ft), and up to 10 m (33 ft) of peat in some areas. Peatlands of this kind are rare in Australia and have developed in isolation from each other and related ecosystems. The accumulation of peat in the swamp is very rapid with most of the peat being formed in the past 25,000 years with up to 6 m (20 ft) of very fresh peat preserved. This is a very rapid accumulation rate, especially for temperate Australia.

Wingecarribee Swamp has a number of plant communities represented including Eucalyptus ovata open woodland, Poa australis closed tussock grassland, Leptospermum ovatum tall shrubland, Sphagnum christatum mossland, Carex gaudichaudiana closed sedgeland, Phragmites communis tall closed grassland, Eleocharis dulcis typha muelleri open sedgeland, Triglochin procerum-carex sp. aquatic sedgeland and Lepyrodia anarthria open rushland which is the dominant community. The lepyrodia community found here is the richest and most extensive of this type known. There is an extension of higher altitude taxa at this site and it might be inferred that the swamp has acted as a refuge for flora and possibly invertebrate fauna since the last cool period. One endangered plant species, Wingecarribee gentian, (Gentiana wingecarribiensis), is an endemic noted only from Wingecarribee Swamp. The nearest relative species is the alpine gentian. Botanical and palaeoenvironmental research has been carried out by several workers with studies continuing.

The peat deposits act as repositories for information about ecosystem history and environmental change in the locality. Fossil wood more than 35,000 years old has been recovered from the north-western margin of the swamp indicating that the swamp may be of this age. Studies of carbonised particles from cores taken from the swamp have inferred a regime of fire events over the 150,000 years prior to European settlement. It is possible that Indigenous values of National Estate significance may exist in this area. As yet these have not been identified, documented or assessed.

A reservoir floods the north west third of the swamp, which is not included in the listing. The dam does not detract from the ecological or palaeoecological values of the section of the swamp listed. Fibrous peat has been extracted from the swamp over twenty years from two mining leases with a total area of about 10 ha (25 acres) so far effected removing the top 3 m (9.8 ft) of peat. This only affects a small area of the swamp. The whole of the swamp is affected by human disturbance. Longitudinal drains about 40 cm (16 in) deep run parallel to the water flow and remove some of the surface water allowing about sixty percent of the surface to be used as rough pasture. Evidence for burning of the swamp is seen as scorched shrubs and burnt fenceposts. Invasions by European weeds is at a remarkably low level except around the margins. Thus although the swamp has probably changed from its pre-European vegetational structure, it still preserves natural communities with the peatland still actively growing.

The adjacent Wingecarribee Swamp covers 340 hectares (840 acres) and is over 5000 years old. It is listed as an Endangered Ecological Community at both State and Federal levels and contains four threatened species: the plants Lyscimachia vulgaris var. davurica (yellow loosestrife); Gentiana wingecarribiensis (Wingecarribee gentian) and Prasophyllum uroglossum (leek orchid) and one insect, Petalura gigantea (giant dragonfly).

== Heritage listing ==
Wingecarribee Swamp is a remnant of a late glacial swamp. It is one of the oldest montane mires known in south-east Australia. Analyses of sediments dated from 15,000 BP (before the present) have provided valuable information about climatic and vegetation changes in Australia since the Pleistocene era.

Wingecarribee Swamp was listed on the New South Wales State Heritage Register on 2 April 1999 having satisfied the following criteria.

The place has potential to yield information that will contribute to an understanding of the cultural or natural history of New South Wales.

Wingecarribee swamp provides a rare example of a peatland in south-east Australia. Peatlands are rare in this region and Wingecarribee because of its large size is classed as outstanding. The swamp is biogeographically significant. It has acted as a refugia for alpine flora and possibly invertebrate fauna since the last cool time approximately 10,000 years ago. An endangered species, gentiana wingecarribeinsis, is known only from this swamp. Its closest relative is the alpine gentian which now occurs only in the Alps.

This swamp is the best example of a montane peatland at comparatively low altitude in Australia. It is also the northernmost significant peatland known in New South Wales. The dominant lepyrodia anarthria open rushland community is the richest and most extensive community of this type known in Australia. The swamp also provides an outstanding example of vegetation dynamics as well as providing some of the best known stands of the swamp vegetation types represented.

Wingecarribee Swamp has the oldest basal date of any montane mire known in Australia. Palaeobotanical and geomorphological analysis of sediments dated from 15,000 BP have provided valuable information about climatic and vegetation changes in Australia since the Pleistocene. Peatlands such as this which accumulate over a long period of time have high research value. Their sediments act as repositories for valuable information about ecosystem history and environmental changes in the locality. Carbonised particles from cores taken from the swamp have provided important evidence of the impact of humans on the vegetation and landscape of the region since the beginning of the Holocene.
