= Medway, New South Wales =

Medway
- Town
- Coordinates: 34°29′S 150°17′E
- Country: Australia
- State: New South Wales
- Region: Southern Highlands
- LGA: Wingecarribee Shire
- Location: 129 km (80 mi) SW of Sydney; 14 km (8.7 mi) W of Bowral; 71 km (44 mi) NE of Goulburn

Government
  - State electorate: Goulburn
  - Federal division: Whitlam
- Elevation: 671 m (2,201 ft)

Population
  - Total: 143 (SAL 2021)
- Postcode: 2577
- County: Camden
- Parish: Berrima, Belanglo
Localities around Medway
Joadja	Berrima	Mount Lindsey
	Medway	Berrima
Belanglo	Sutton Forest

Medway is a village in the Southern Highlands of New South Wales, Australia, in Wingecarribee Shire. It was formerly known as Village of Medway.

According to the 2016 census, there were 119 residents recorded. At the 2021 census, there were 143 people residing at Medway.
