= Mount Murray (New South Wales) =

- Town
- Coordinates: 34°33′00″S 150°37′30″E
- Country: Australia
- State: New South Wales
- Region: Southern Highlands
- LGA: Wingecarribee Shire
- Location: 148 km (92 mi) SW of Sydney; 29 km (18 mi) E of Bowral; 40 km (25 mi) SW of Wollongong

Government
  - State electorate: Goulburn
  - Federal division: Whitlam
- Elevation: 780 m (2,560 ft)
- Postcode: 2577
- County: Camden
- Parish: Kangaloon
Localities around Mount Murray
	Avon	Marshall Mount
East Kangaloon	Mount Murray	Tongarra
Robertson	Robertson	Knights Hill

Mount Murray is a mountain in New South Wales, Australia with an elevation of 780 metres (2,560 ft) above sea level. It is located six kilometres (3.7 mi) outside Robertson. The mountain is named after Sir George Murray. Mount Murray is also the name of a location at the top of the Macquarie Pass on the Illawarra Highway.

According to the 2016 census, it had a population of 54. At the 2021 census, there were 53 residents at Mount Murray.

== Heritage listings ==
Mount Murray has a number of heritage-listed sites, including:

- Moss Vale–Unanderra railway: Mount Murray railway station
