= Bangadilly, New South Wales =

Bangadilly
- Region
- Coordinates: 34°26′S 150°8′E
- Country: Australia
- State: New South Wales
- LGA: Wingecarribee Shire
- Location: 117 km (73 mi) from Sydney; 31 km (19 mi) from Sutton Forest

Government
  - State electorate: Goulburn
  - Federal division: Whitlam

Population
  - Total: 426 (2006 census)
- Postcode: 2577
- County: Camden
- Parish: Bangadilly

Bangadilly is an unofficial locality near the Southern Highlands of New South Wales, Australia, in Wingecarribee Shire. Bangadilly was originally recognized as a place name by the Geographical Names Board on the 25 November 1998, but the name was subsequently abandoned due to objections.
