= Burrawang =

Burrawang may refer to:

- The cycad plant species Macrozamia communis
- Other species in the genus Macrozamia
- Burrawang, New South Wales, Australia, a town named after the cycad
