= The Appleton Ladies' Potato Race =

- Based on: The Appleton Ladies' Potato Race by Melanie Tait
- Screenplay by: Melanie Tait
- Directed by: Lynn Hegarty
- Starring: Claire van der Boom; Katie Wall; Genevieve Lemon; Tiriel Mora; Robyn Nevin; Olivia Stamboulia; Andy Ryan
- Music by: Cornel Wilczek; Thomas Rouch
- Country of origin: Australia
- Original language: English

Production
- Producers: Andrea Keir; Lisa Duff
- Cinematography: Henry Pierce
- Editor: Katie Flaxman
- Running time: 108 minutes

Original release
- Network: Network 10
- Release: 26 July 2023

The Appleton Ladies' Potato Race is a 2023 Australian television film based on the stage play of the same name by Australian playwright and journalist Melanie Tait. The film premiered in Australia on Network Ten and was released on streaming on Paramount+ Australia.

== Plot ==
Doctor Penny Anderson moves from Sydney to her childhood home of Appleton. While visiting the hair salon of her sister Nikki, Penny sees a flyer advertising The Appleton Show and its famous potato race. She discovers the men's first prize pays out $2,000 and the winning woman's prize is only $200. Penny leads a protest which causes turmoil in Appleton, particularly with Nikki, who is the current champion.

Nikki's brother-in-law Gavin vigorously opposes any increase in the prize money for the women's race, and when Penny succeeds in raising enough money to offer a bigger prize, he attempts to sabotage the ladies' race.

== Cast ==
- Claire van der Boom as Penny Anderson
- Katie Wall as Nikki Anderson Bunyan
- Genevieve Lemon as Barb Brickner
- Tiriel Mora as Bob Bunyan
- Robyn Nevin as Joan Bunyan
- Olivia Stamboulia as Rania Hamid
- Andy Ryan as Gavin Bunyan
- Cece Peters as Kazzy Pearce
- Rohan Nichol as Mark Bunyan
- Nicholas Bakopoulos-Cooke as Elliot Bunyan
- TJ Barrett as Ethan Bunyan
- William Glinellis as Eddie Bunyan
- Safia Arain as Miriam Hamid
- Darren Gilshenan as Billy Pope
- John Batchelor as Billy Pearce
- Maggie Dence as Miss Vaughn
- John Gaden as Dr Holliday
- Will McNeill as Luke Pearce

== Production ==
The film is based on a play by Melanie Tait, originally developed and performed with the Ensemble Theatre in Sydney. This was inspired by a real event in Tait's hometown of Robertson, New South Wales.

The film was shot in Sydney and the Southern Highlands with finance from Screen Australia, Screen NSW, and the NSW Regional Film Fund.

== Reception ==
Andrew Mercardo of Mediaweek called it "charming… whilst it doesn’t play like a pilot, it would make for a great ongoing series." Lenny Ann Low of The Sydney Morning Herald described the film as "sparky, funny, compassionate and honest."
