= Bullio, New South Wales =

Bullio
- Town
- Coordinates: 34.345°S 150.169°E
- Country: Australia
- State: New South Wales
- Region: Southern Highlands
- LGA: Wingecarribee Shire
- Location: 147 km (91 mi) SW of Sydney; 34 km (21 mi) WNW of Mittagong; 103 km (64 mi) NE of Goulburn

Government
  - State electorate: Goulburn
  - Federal division: Whitlam
- Elevation: 777 m (2,549 ft)

Population
  - Total: 79 (SAL 2021)
- Postcode: 2575
- County: Camden
- Parish: Bullio
Localities around Bullio
| | Blue Mountains National Park |
| Goodmans Ford | Bullio | High Range |
| Bannaby | Canyonleigh | Joadja |

Bullio (/ˈbʊlioʊ/) is a small village in the Southern Highlands of New South Wales, Australia, in Wingecarribee Shire.

At the 2016 census, Bullio had a population of 82. At the 2021 census, there were 79 people living at Bullio.
