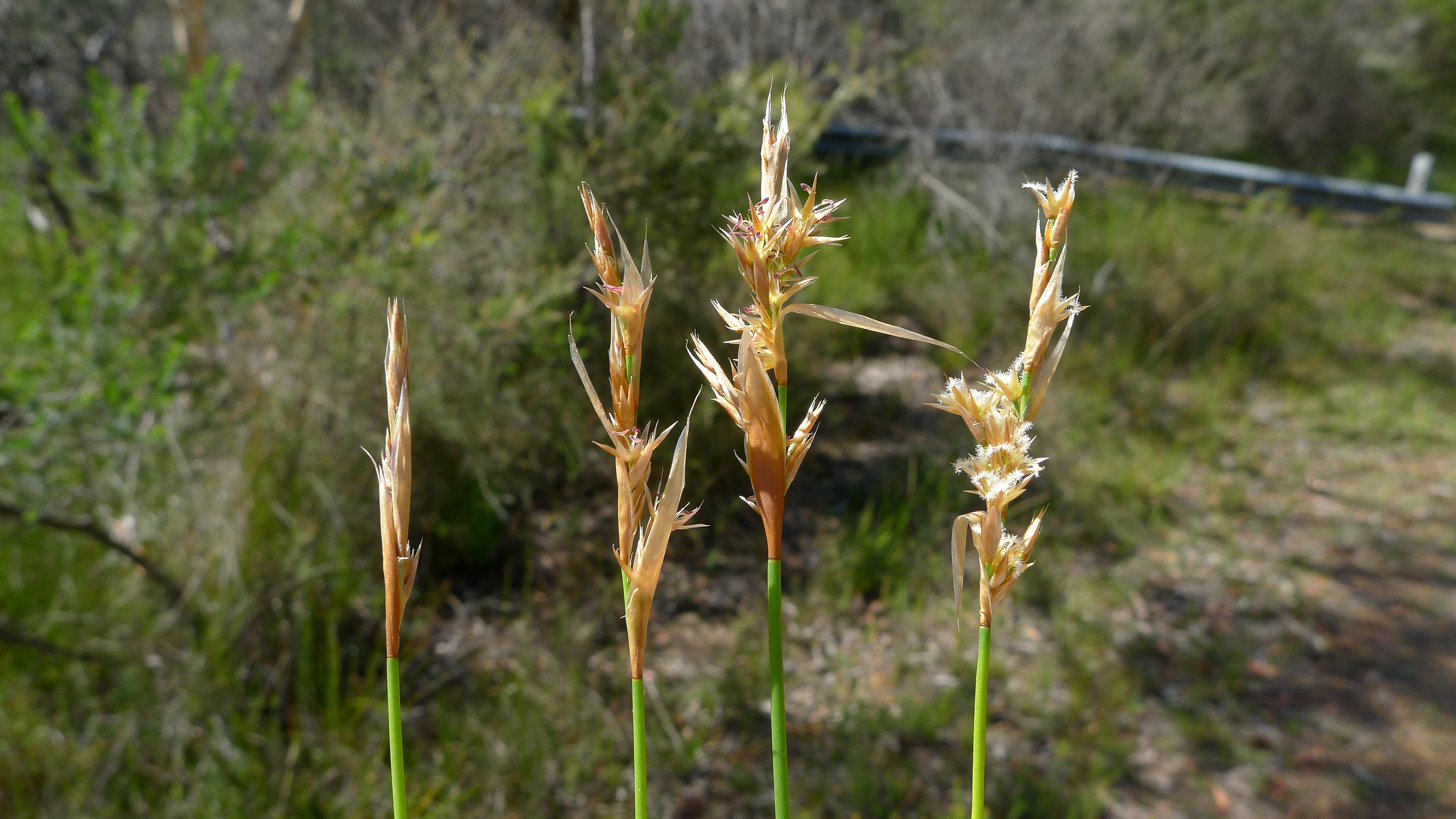
- Dharawal National Park, Australia

Scientific classification
- Kingdom: Plantae
- Clade: Tracheophytes
- Clade: Angiosperms
- Clade: Monocots
- Clade: Commelinids
- Order: Poales
- Family: Restionaceae
- Genus: Lepyrodia
- Species: L. scariosa

Binomial name
- Lepyrodia scariosa R.Br.

= Lepyrodia scariosa =

Species of plant

Lepyrodia scariosa is a common species of grass-like plant of the family Restionaceae. It is found mainly in New South Wales in moist sand or peaty soil, growing up to 90 cm tall in heath and woodland and near the edges of swamps. The specific epithet scariosa is derived from Latin, meaning membranous or scar-like, referring to the floral bracts. This is one of the many plants first published by Robert Brown with the type known as "(J.) v.v.", which means that Brown saw it living at Port Jackson. It appears in his Prodromus Florae Novae Hollandiae et Insulae Van Diemen in 1810.
