= Belanglo, New South Wales =

Belanglo
- Town
- Coordinates: 34°31′51″S 150°15′37″E
- Country: Australia
- State: New South Wales
- Region: Southern Highlands
- LGA: Wingecarribee Shire

Government
  - State electorate: Goulburn
  - Federal division: Whitlam

Population
  - Total: 22 (SAL 2021)
- Postcode: 2577
- County: Camden
- Parish: Belanglo
Localities around Belanglo
	Joadja
Canyonleigh	Belanglo	Medway
Sutton Forest	Canyonleigh

Belanglo /bəˈlæŋɡloʊ/ is a locality around the Belanglo State Forest in the Southern Highlands of New South Wales, Australia, in Wingecarribee Shire.

== History ==
The infamous Backpacker murders occurred in the Belanglo State Forest in between the years of 1989–1993. The 7 victims were brutally murdered by the criminal Ivan Milat, who was serving 7 life sentences in Goulburn Correctional Centre with a non-parole period up until his death from cancer in 2019. Ivan continued to claim his innocence against the killings of these several backpackers. Milat's great nephew, Matthew Milat was sentenced to 43 years in prison for murdering Bargo teenager David Auchterlonie in the Belanglo State Forest in 2010. Another person, Karlie Pearce-Stevenson was murdered and then dumped in the forest; her body was only found in 2010 and the body of her daughter was found next to a highway in 2015.

== Population ==
At the 2021 census, 22 people were recorded living at Belanglo. According to the 2016 census, there were 27 people living at Belanglo.
