= The Vegemite Tales =

Play by Melanie Tait

- Original language: English
- Written by: Melanie Tait
- Setting: London, England

Premiere
- Date: 2001
- Place: The Curtain's Up, London

The Vegemite Tales is a comedy theatrical production written by Australian playwright Melanie Tait. The play revolves around the lives of a group of young expats sharing a flat in Hammersmith, west London. It has been described as an Australian stage version of Friends. The name is taken from the iconic Australian food paste, Vegemite.

== Background ==
The Vegemite Tales was first staged at Barons Court Theatre, a small fringe theatre in west London in 2001. It was an overnight sell-out, finding enormous popularity with London's Australian, New Zealand, and South African communities.

Contemporary themes include living in a shared house, living in a city far away from home, dealing with different cultures and making the difficult decision to stop putting real life on hold and move back home. It has been reviewed as relying on cliches about living in London.

== Cast ==
Characters
Name	Synopsis	Played by (2006 season)
Dan	Quintessential bloke	Blair McDonough
Eddie	Good-hearted airhead	Tom Sangster
Gemma	Artist	Jessica Gerger
Gio	Italian waiter	Andy Leonard
Jane	Nasty Melburnian actress	Rebecca Gethings
Maddie	Romantic interest	Sarah McGlade
Portia	Blonde Thatcherite bombshell	Rebecca Gethings
Sam	Father figure	Andrew Robb
Guardian Angel	Backpacker angel	Brian Belo, Jade Goody

The 2006 & 2007 seasons featured Blair McDonough (ex Neighbours and Australian Big Brother). Other cast members have included Jonathon Dutton, Sarah Hadland, Ben Steel, Josephine Taylor, Patrick Harvey, Craig Rasmus, Tim Cove, Maxine Morrison, Priscilla Jackman, Dimity Harris, Christa Nicola, Spencer McLaren, Billy Gentle, Felicity Jurd, Justin Segal, Louis Sanchez, and Craig Giovanelli.

== Production ==
Following its successful 2001 premiere at the Curtains's Up, the show moved to the Old Red Lion and then the Courtyard. In 2005 the show had a 12-week sell-out season at the Riverside Studios, a London arts venue well known for its international theatre programme.

In 2006 the production made its successful West End debut at The Venue (now The Leicester Square Theatre).

In 2007 the production had its second West End season at The Venue from 26 July to 27 October.

The production was directed by Melanie Tait (2001-2003) and Bill Buckhurst (2004-2007). It was produced by Melanie Tait (2001-2004) and Andrew Robb (2005-2007).

Over 60,000 people have seen The Vegemite Tales since it was first staged.

== Documentary ==
In late 2025 Andrew Robb Films commenced production on a feature-length documentary about The Vegemite Tales.
