= Ginger Gorman =

Australian journalist

Ginger Gorman (born Claire Gorman) is an Australian social justice journalist, known for her book Troll Hunting: inside the world of online hate and its human fallout (2019). Gorman has worked in radio and print media since 2002, working as a freelance journalist since 2005. Since the publication of Troll Hunting she has mainly focused on links between trolling syndications and more serious crimes, including murder and terrorism. She is based in Canberra in the Australian Capital Territory.

== Early life and education ==
Gorman was born Claire Gorman in Wellington, New Zealand. She was nicknamed Ginger by a friend during her student days when a housemate noticed she liked to put a lot of ginger in her curries. She has used the name Ginger ever since.

Gorman's mother, a physiotherapist, was born in England to Slovak Jews who had fled the Holocaust. Her father, a teacher and, later, a diplomat, was from a poor Catholic family in Melbourne. Her parents met in Vancouver but later moved back to Australia. In Australia, Gorman's father joined the Department of Foreign Affairs and Trade and, as a diplomat, took his family around the world. Soon after Gorman was born, the family moved to a diplomatic posting in Pakistan. Gorman, the middle of three girls, also lived in England, Thailand, Ireland, Germany, and The Netherlands as a child of a diplomat; however, she regards Canberra as her home.

Gorman attended Narrabundah College in Canberra, and completed both the HSC and the International Baccalaureate Diploma, starting at the International School of Bangkok. Following this, Gorman went on to study journalism at RMIT University within the School of Communication and Media.

== Career ==
After graduating from RMIT, Gorman worked briefly as a print journalist for Fairfax Community Newspapers (now Australian Community Media) in Melbourne. Following this, from 2002 to 2015, she worked for ABC radio, in various roles, including producing, reporting, presenting and management. She worked mostly in Canberra on Radio 666 ABC Radio Canberra but with secondments to Melbourne, Cairns and Mount Isa. At the ABC, Gorman presented daily news programs and, in Cairns, she was the presenter for Radio Drive, a program broadcast throughout Far North Queensland. During this period, in 2008, Gorman briefly moved to the Netherlands to produce “The State We’re In” for Radio Netherlands Worldwide.

Gorman uses an immersive style of research and her work has been described as "fearless" by The Canberra Times journalist Megan Doherty. Speaking of the research Gorman undertook for Troll Hunting, journalist Tracey Spicer said Gorman had "risked her life to produce this book".

Some of Gorman's best-known stories include the live recording of plastic surgery, letting listeners hear her be set upon by a police dog, an award-winning series on death that included seeing a body being prepared in a morgue and another being burnt in a crematorium, as well as speaking to an inmate prior to his release from the Alexander Maconochie Centre in Canberra after serving a 12-year sentence for his part in another man's death.

One of Gorman's stories based on sexual orientation discrimination became part of a controversy years after its publication. In 2010, while presenting RN Drive for ABC Far North in Cairns, Gorman interviewed a gay couple with an adopted Russian-born son, with the story afterwards published online. Two years after publication, the couple Gorman interviewed were arrested for paedophilia. In an orchestrated attack by internet trolls, Gorman was castigated for her previous article. Gorman stood her ground against the attacks, admitted her mistakes, and spoke on the topic of internet trolling in a TEDxCanberra presentation. Based on her experience, she began to research the topic of Internet trolls and cyberhate, and later (2017) wrote series of articles and a book (Troll Hunting, 2019) on these topics.

In 2015, Gorman volunteered to accept a redundancy package from the ABC. She has since worked as a freelance journalist and author. Gorman is supported, in part, through subscriptions to the crowdfunding platform, Patreon, on which she posts monthly articles.

In January 2017, Gorman called out the online journals Mamamia and the Daily Mail for plagiarising her work on child abuse. Gorman had worked for months researching and writing an article for news.com.au called "Unspoken abuse: mothers who rape their sons". Excerpts and quotes from the article appeared in these publications without permission and/or attribution. Newscorp (owner of news.com.au) took the Daily Mail to court over the matter, but it was settled (reportedly without money changing hands) in a confidential settlement three months later.

In 2017, together with freelance journalist Sue White, Gorman became the co-director of Media Bootcamp. Media Bootcamp offers media training courses, both online and in person, in Sydney, Melbourne, and Canberra.

Her book Troll Hunting: inside the world of online hate and its human fallout was published in 2019.

In 2020, soon after Australia became exposed to the COVID-19 pandemic, Gorman became the host of the Academy of the Social Sciences in Australia podcast series, Seriously Social. Each week, Gorman interviewed leading Australian social scientists for insights into how the pandemic is affecting Australians and advice on how to manage the challenges of living in lockdown. Since 2022 the coverage of the podcast has diversified to cover other topics.

Since Troll Hunting, Gorman's work focuses mainly on trolling syndications and the links between internet trolling, terrorism, and violent crime. She is based in Canberra.

== Troll Hunting ==
In 2013, Gorman and her family suffered the effects of online hate speech after a same-sex couple Gorman interviewed in a story on parenting were exposed as paedophiles. From this experience, Gorman wrote a series of articles in 2017 on cyberhate for Fairfax Media and, later, her first book, Troll Hunting (published by Hardie Grant in February 2019). Troll Hunting explores the recruitment, strategies, characteristics and crimes of predator trolls.

During her five-year research project into online trolling, Gorman adopted an approach she later identified as the "radical empathy", described in Cheryl Strayed's book, Tiny Beautiful Things: Advice on Love and Life from Dear Sugar. Gorman contacted the internet trolls who had targeted her, earned their trust, and, ultimately formed complex and long-standing relationships with them. This gave her first-hand insight into their lives and motivations.

In Troll Hunting, Gorman explores the stereotype of trolls as hateful but, ultimately harmless, lone-wolves. Her research shows that predator trolls often hold down good jobs, lead normal lives, and work in international, online syndicates. She found that, in common with terrorist organisations, these syndicates use the internet to recruit and radicalise young people (mostly boys) aged 10–16. She warns that predator trolls do not confine their activities to the Internet; that attacks often spill over into the real world as stalking, physical abuse, murder, or even terrorism.

She writes:

One of the most pernicious myths about predator trolling is that it's virtual — that it stays online in a kind of fairyland. My research links predator trolling to all kinds of real-life horrors: shootings, suicide and suicide attempts, a woman killed and many others injured at a Unite the Right rally in Charlottesville, indecent communication with a child, stalking, domestic violence, PTSD, mental illness and more.”

— Ginger Gorman, ABC News

Soon after the publication of Gorman's book, 51 people were killed in the Christchurch mosque shootings; consecutive attacks on two mosques in Christchurch, New Zealand. The accused, a 28-year-old Australian man, was revealed as a member of an online trolling syndicate similar to those Gorman discusses in her book. At the invitation of the Institute of Directors in New Zealand, Gorman visited New Zealand to speak at their national conference and explain how an event like the Christchurch attack was foreshadowed in her book.

In 2019, Gorman spoke about social media self-defence at the 2019 KnowHow EdTech conference in Norway.

Because of her research, book and body of work, Gorman is now recognised as an international expert on online hate. She has written and spoken extensively about trolling and social media self-defence in Australian and global contexts.

Gorman's work on predator trolls has been widely disseminated online, in the media, and within academia. The American online journal Wired ranked Troll Hunting as #1 on its list of "must read" books for Summer 2019. Gorman has been interviewed on BBC World Service's "Trending", and by Ryan Tubridy on Ireland's RTÉ Radio 1. On 28 January 2019, Gorman appeared as a panelist, discussing online abuse and trolling, on ABC TV's The Drum.

== Other activities ==
After suffering from postnatal depression following the birth of her first daughter, Gorman became an ambassador for PANDSI (Post and Ante Natal Depression Support and Information Inc.) in Canberra. In 2006, Gorman's personal interest in "retro" baking and her childhood memories of The Australian Women's Weekly birthday cakes, inspired her to organise Cake Off, as a fundraising event for PANDSI. Staged as a competition, PANDSI's Cake Off has now become an annual event.

Gorman is also an ambassador for the Cancer Council Australia and Daffodil Day.

She has also been on the Canberra organising committee for Women in Media.

In November 2019, Gorman, together with photographers Hillary Wardhaugh and Martin Ollman, sculptor Tom Buckland, and printmaker Jess Higgens, was one of the organisers of "On Thin Ice", an arts-documentary collaboration which allowed young people recovering from addiction to crystal methamphetamine to tell their stories. The event was held at the Tuggeranong Arts Centre in Canberra.

== Awards and recognition ==
- 2006: World Press Institute Fellowship, which enabled Gorman to complete a study tour of the United States
- 2007: Annette Taylor Award for Excellence in Journalism, as well as The National Press Club (Australia) award for excellence in Health Journalism, for her interview series on organ donation
- 2023: Edna Ryan Awards - For Making a Feminist Difference in Media Communication

== Personal life ==
In early 2007, Gorman was diagnosed with thyroid cancer. Without treatment Gorman was given 18 months to live, but, with treatment, made a full recovery.

She married Don Gomez and they have two daughters.

She became friends with playwright Melanie Tait, after reaching out to her for forgiveness for having acted badly towards her for some years.
