= Berrima Parish =

Coordinates: 34°27′S 150°20′E

Berrima Parish New South Wales
- LGA(s): Wingecarribee
- Region: Southern Highlands
- County: Camden
- Division: Eastern
Lands administrative divisions around Berrima Parish:
Joadja	Jellore	Colo
Joadja	Berrima Parish	Mittagong
Belanglo	Bong Bong	Mittagong

The Parish of Berrima is a parish of the County of Camden in the Southern Highlands region of New South Wales. Berrima is the largest town in the parish, and the parish includes the land to the north and north-east of this town. The Wingecarribee River forms part of the boundary of the parish in the south, although some of the land near Berrima that is to the south of the river is also included in the parish. Both the old and new Hume Highway pass through the parish from the south-west to the north-east. Gibraltar creek is part of the boundary in the north-east. Bowral and Mittagong are located just to the east of the parish, along with the Southern Highlands railway line. Mandemar is located in the north-west of the parish.
