= Melanie Tait =

Australian radio broadcaster, playwright and author

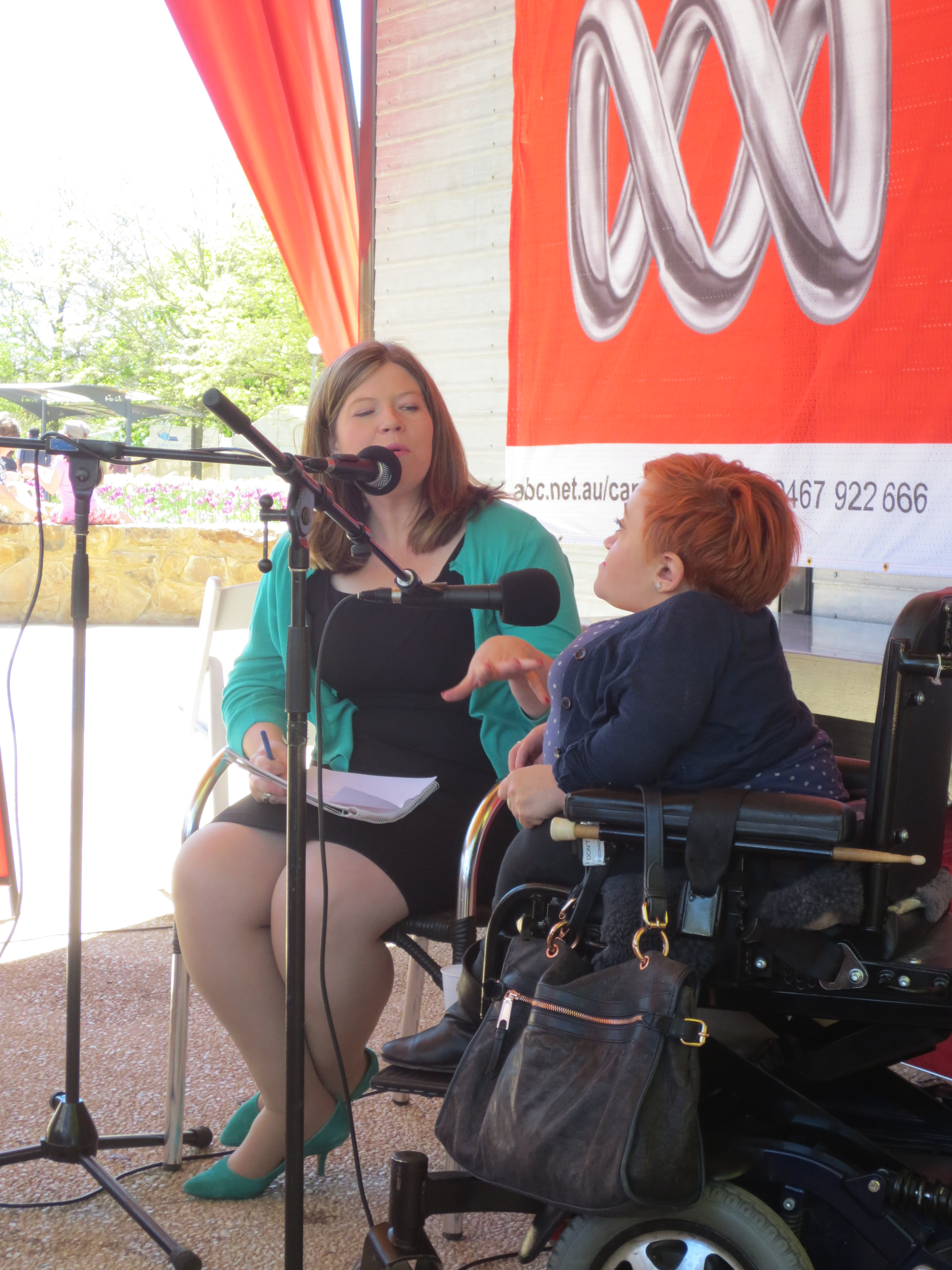
- Tait interviewing Stella Young at Floriade in Canberra in 2013
- Born: c. 1981
- Occupations: Radio presenter, journalist, playwright, screenwriter
- Known for: The Vegemite Tales; The Appleton Ladies' Potato Race

Melanie Tait (born c. 1981) is an Australian playwright, radio presenter, screenwriter, and journalist. As of 2024 a freelance journalist, she often writes for ABC Online, Guardian Australia, and news.com.au. She is the author of several plays, including The Appleton Ladies' Potato Race, which was made into a film of the same name, released in 2023.

== Early life ==
Melanie Tait was born in 1980 or 1981 and grew up in Robertson, New South Wales, where her parents built and ran a grocery store for 34 years. They bought "The Big Potato" in Robertson, which is located in the lot next to the store, when it was put up for sale around 2012–3.

== Career ==
At around 20 or 21 years of age Tait wrote the play The Vegemite Tales, which played in London over seven years from 2001 to 2007, including two years on the West End. The play focused on a group of young adults living in a London flat.

In 2001 Tait founded the Itchy Feet Company in London, and in 2002 was appointed artistic director of the Old Red Lion Theatre at The Angel, Islington, where she stayed until 2004.

Returning to Australia in 2005, Tait began her radio career as a producer on the John Laws Morning Show. She then moved to the Australian Broadcasting Corporation (ABC) as a trainee rural reporter in Darwin, before travelling around Australia for several years for ABC Rural, ABC News, and ABC Local Radio. She presented programs on 105.7 ABC Darwin, 702 ABC Sydney as well as on Radio National. career in broadcasting at the, where she worked as a journalist for 12 years. During her time at the ABC, Tait curated a live storytelling series, Now Hear This, for five years, and later presented Evenings on ABC Radio Hobart.

In 2010, Tait published the autobiographical work Fat Chance: My Big Fat Gastric Band Adventure. At that time, she was living in Canberra. The book was commended in the 2011 ACT Book of the Year Awards. Tait was the recipient of two ACT Arts Grants, in 2012 and 2014.

After leaving the ABC, she returned to playwriting with 2019's The Appleton Ladies' Potato Race, which was developed and performed with the Ensemble Theatre in Sydney, before being performed around the country. She also wrote the screenplay for the film adaptation, made by Paramount+ and released in 2023. The story was inspired by a real event in Tait's hometown of Robertson, NSW. At first the network was not keen on Tait writing the screenplay, but the producer Andrea Keir fought for her, and she was mentored by veteran screenwriter and novelist Kylie Needham.

Her third play, A Broadcast Coup, described as a "#MeToo comedy", premiered at Ensemble Theatre as part of Sydney Festival in January 2023.

She was the co-host and co-creator, with Kim Lester, of A Country Podcast, which was billed as "an affectionate look at one of Australia's all-time favourite TV shows – A Country Practice. It ran from September 2020 until 8 April 2022, and featured members of the cast and crew of the show.

As of 2023 Tait is a freelance writer, who frequently contributes to ABC Online, Guardian Australia, and news.com.au. She has also written for Guardian UK, The Daily Telegraph, Tasmanian literary magazine Island Magazine, and Mamamia. She said in July 2023 that she was working on several plays, two screenplays (one co-written with Yvette Poshoglian), and there was a television series in development with Cecilia Ritchie.

== Personal life ==
Tait had gastric banding surgery performed sometime before 2010, and lost around 25 kg (55 lb). She had the band removed in 2014, thinking that her eating disorder was under control, but found that her weight ballooned again. She spent a month in a specialist clinic in 2016 to treat her food-related depression, and in 2017 opted for the more drastic vertical-sleeve gastrectomy. She wrote that she had been unable to join the fat acceptance movement, despite trying. She was living in Hobart at the time and had to fly to Sydney to have the surgery.

Tait and Ginger Gorman became friends after many years of a professional rivalry at the ABC that verged on outright hostility, after Gorman had been made redundant in 2015 and reached out to Tait and asked for forgiveness for her previous behaviour.

As of May 2024 Tait lives in Sydney, after moving there with her two dogs from Hobart some time previously.

== Works ==
=== Plays ===
Tait's plays include:

- The Vegemite Tales (2001-2007)
- The Appleton Ladies' Potato Race (2019)
- A Broadcast Coup (2023)
- The Queen's Nanny (2024)
- How to Plot A Hit in Two Days (2025)
- The Royal Experiment (2025)

=== Books ===
- Fat Chance: My Big Fat Gastric Banding Adventure, 2010, New Holland Publishers Australia (ISBN 9781741109658).
