= East Kangaloon =

- Town
- Coordinates: 34°30′57″S 150°36′02″E
- Country: Australia
- State: New South Wales
- Region: Southern Highlands
- LGA: Wingecarribee Shire
- Location: 143 km (89 mi) SW of Sydney; 20 km (12 mi) ESE of Bowral; 52 km (32 mi) WSW of Wollongong

Government
  - State electorate: Goulburn
  - Federal division: Whitlam
- Elevation: 660 m (2,170 ft)

Population
  - Total: 80 (SAL 2021)
- Postcode: 2576
- County: Camden
- Parish: Mittagong, Kangaloon
Localities around East Kangaloon
Kangaloon	East Kangaloon	Mount Murray
	Robertson

East Kangaloon is a locality in the Southern Highlands of New South Wales, Australia, in Wingecarribee Shire.

At the 2016 census, it had a population of 83. According to the 2021 census, there were 80 people living at East Kangaloon.
