= Robertson Nature Reserve =

Nature reserve of New South Wales, Australia

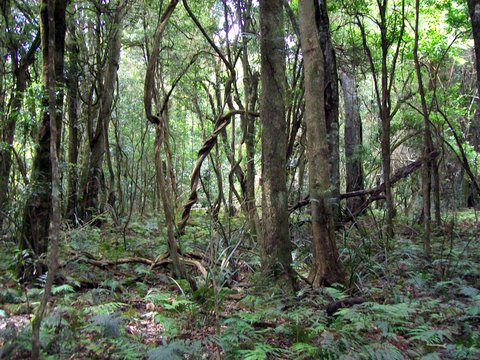
- Rainforest at Robertson Nature Reserve

- Location within New South Wales
- Location: New South Wales
- Nearest city: Robertson
- Coordinates: 34°35′36″S 150°35′49″E
- Area: 0.053 km^{2} (0.020 sq mi)
- Established: January 1979
- Governing body: NSW National Parks and Wildlife Service
- Website: Official website

The Robertson Nature Reserve is a protected rainforest nature reserve in the Southern Highlands region of New South Wales, in eastern Australia. The 5.3-hectare (13-acre) reserve is situated near Robertson on the edge of the Illawarra Escarpment and is a remnant of the Yarrawa Brush, once 2,450 hectares (6,100 acres) in size.

== Features ==
A 600-metre (2,000 ft) track through the forest is suitable to wheelchairs, with several signs with information on local plants and animals. The reserve is situated on the outskirts of Robertson, at 750 metres (2,460 ft) above sea level.

Despite the relatively rich basaltic soils, and 1,600 millimetres (63 in) of average annual rainfall, the rainforest has a low 15-metre (49 ft) canopy, with only a few trees taller than 20 metres (66 ft). Because of small size and isolation, the reserve is subject to weed attack. Chinese Privet and Glossy Privet, Holly and Himalayan Blackberry being particularly troublesome.

The rainforest is categorised as warm temperate rainforest, (not cool temperate), with the canopy dominated by trees such as golden sassafras, coachwood, Lilly Pilly, Native Daphne, Possumwood, Beefwood, Featherwood and Blackwood. Genuine cool temperate rainforest trees such as pinkwood and black olive berry are either absent or inconspicuous. A common tree species is the Brown Beech, usually associated with tropical or sub-tropical rainforests.

== See also ==
- Protected areas of New South Wales
