= Wildes Meadow, New South Wales =

Wildes Meadow
- Town
- Coordinates: 34°36′S 150°31′E
- Country: Australia
- State: New South Wales
- Region: Southern Highlands
- LGA: Wingecarribee Shire
- Location: 140 km (87 mi) SW of Sydney; 19 km (12 mi) ESE of Moss Vale; 7 km (4.3 mi) SW of Robertson; 89 km (55 mi) ENE of Goulburn

Government
  - State electorate: Goulburn
  - Federal division: Whitlam
- Elevation: 695 m (2,280 ft)

Population
  - Total: 249 (SAL 2021)
- Postcode: 2577
- County: Camden
- Parish: Kangaloon
Localities around Wildes Meadow
Burrawang		Robertson
Avoca	Wildes Meadow
Fitzroy Falls		Upper Kangaroo Valley

Wildes Meadow is a locality in the Southern Highlands of New South Wales, Australia, in Wingecarribee Shire.

According to the 2016 census, it had a population of 259. At the 2021 census, there were 249 people living at Wildes Meadow.
