= Mandemar, New South Wales =

Mandemar
- Town
- Coordinates: 34°26′S 150°17′E
- Country: Australia
- State: New South Wales
- Region: Southern Highlands
- LGA: Wingecarribee Shire
- Location: 133 km (83 mi) SW of Sydney; 20 km (12 mi) W of Mittagong; 86 km (53 mi) ENE of Goulburn

Government
  - State electorate: Goulburn
  - Federal division: Whitlam
- Elevation: 702 m (2,303 ft)

Population
  - Total: 64 (SAL 2021)
- Postcode: 2575
- County: Camden
- Parish: Berrima, Joadja
Localities around Mandemar
	High Range
Joadja	Mandemar	Berrima
	Berrima

Mandemar (/mændɪmɑːr/) is a locality in the Southern Highlands of New South Wales, Australia, in Wingecarribee Shire. The village is situated east of the ghost town, Joadja and has its own NSW Rural Fire Service.

According to the 2016 census, the population of Mandemar was 62. At the 2021 census, 64 residents were recorded.
