= Avoca, New South Wales =

Avoca
- Town
- Coordinates: 34°36′55″S 150°29′05″E
- Country: Australia
- State: New South Wales
- Region: Southern Highlands
- LGA: Wingecarribee Shire
- Location: 137 km (85 mi) SW of Sydney; 15 km (9.3 mi) ESE of Moss Vale; 85 km (53 mi) ENE of Goulburn

Government
  - State electorate: Kiama
  - Federal division: Whitlam
- Elevation: 722 m (2,369 ft)

Population
  - Total: 208 (SAL 2021)
- Postcode: 2577
- County: Camden
- Parish: Yarrunga
Localities around Avoca
Moss Vale	Glenquarry	Burrawang
Moss Vale	Avoca	Wildes Meadow
Fitzroy Falls	Fitzroy Falls	Wildes Meadow

Avoca (/əˈvoʊkə/) is a small town in the Southern Highlands of New South Wales, Australia, in Wingecarribee Shire.

Situated 700 m above sea level, Avoca is just 15 minutes drive from bigger towns such as Bowral and Moss Vale and around 25 minutes drive to Mittagong. The village includes a public school, with around 7 students, an events hall (Avoca Hall) and a NSW RFS brigade, although it is situated further away from the main centre of the village. Avoca is situated on the main Sheepwash Road. The village also includes several dairy farms, which provide milk to many larger companies such as Pura Milk and Dairy Farmers.

== Etymology ==
The village of Avoca was named after the River Avoca in Ireland in 1867.

== Events ==
- Annual Avoca XI vs Burrawang XI cricket match on Australia Day.
- Avoca Bushtime Dance – monthly Friday night dance held at the Avoca Hall, open to all ages.
- Red Faces – a talent contest held annually with a close association and support from the Avoca Public School.
- Waratah Ball – annual dinner held in October with all proceeds going to the Hall committee.

== Transport ==
Daily bus services are provided by Berrima Buslines, morning and afternoons in conjunction with local school times. They travel along the Illawarra Highway and Barrengarry Mountain, en route to Kangaroo Valley and Nowra.

== Population ==
According to the 2021 census, there were 208 people living in Avoca. At the 2016 census, the population was 199.
