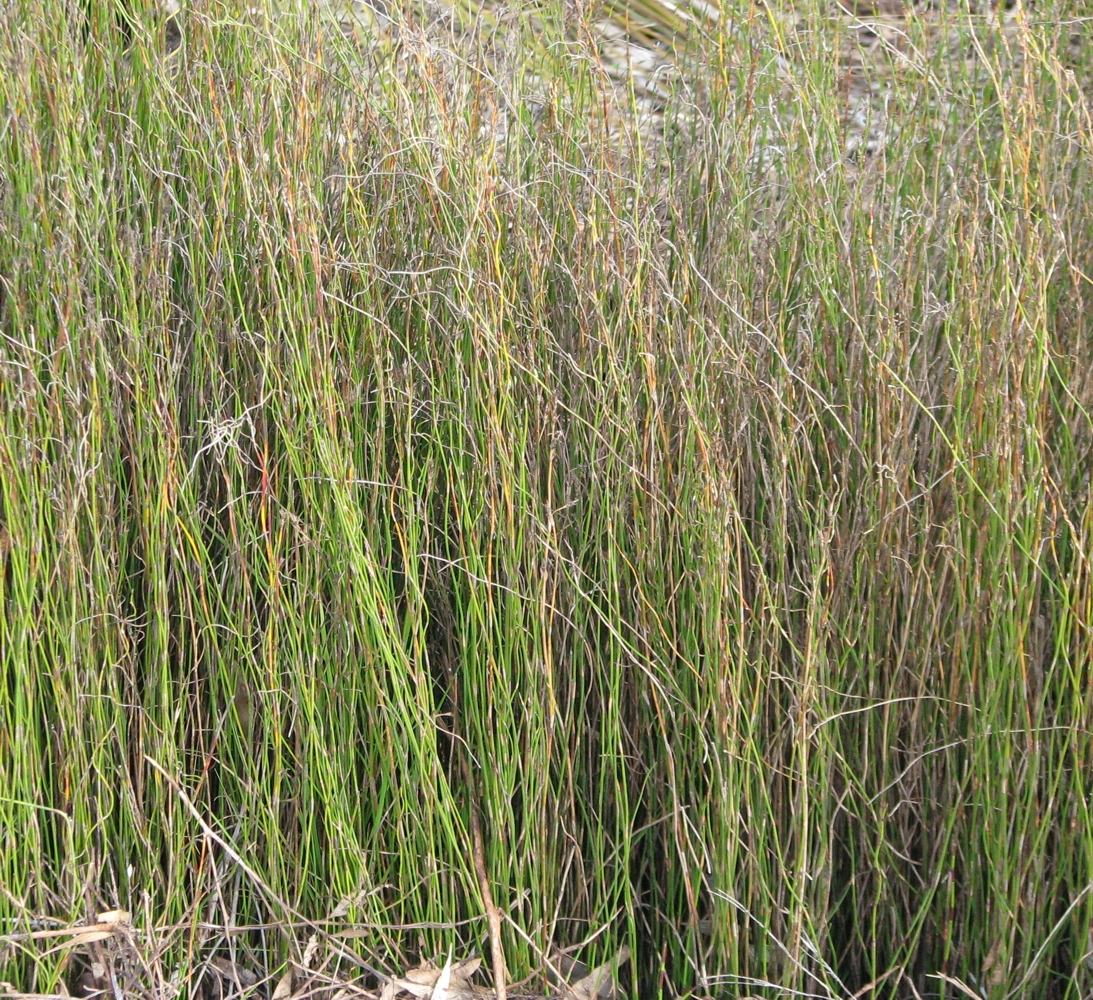
- Lepyrodia muelleri

Scientific classification
- Kingdom: Plantae
- Clade: Tracheophytes
- Clade: Angiosperms
- Clade: Monocots
- Clade: Commelinids
- Order: Poales
- Family: Restionaceae
- Genus: Lepyrodia; R.Br.

= Lepyrodia =

Genus of flowering plants

Lepyrodia is a plant genus in the family Restionaceae, described as a genus in 1810.

The entire genus is endemic to Australia, found in all 6 states and in the Northern Territory.

Species

- Lepyrodia anarthria F.Muell. - Qld, NSW, Vic, NT
- Lepyrodia drummondiana Steud. - WA
- Lepyrodia flexuosa (Benth.) L.A.S.Johnson & O.D.Evans - Vic
- Lepyrodia glauca (Nees) F.Muell. - WA
- Lepyrodia heleocharoides Gilg - WA
- Lepyrodia hermaphrodita R.Br. - WA
- Lepyrodia leptocaulis L.A.S.Johnson & O.D.Evans - Qld, NSW
- Lepyrodia macra Nees - WA
- Lepyrodia monoica F.Muell. - WA
- Lepyrodia muelleri Benth. - NSW, Vic, SA, Tas
- Lepyrodia muirii F.Muell. - WA
- Lepyrodia scariosa R.Br. - Qld, NSW
- Lepyrodia valliculae J.M.Black - SA incl. Kangaroo I
