= Burrawang, New South Wales =

Coordinates: 34°36′S 150°31′E

Burrawang
- Town
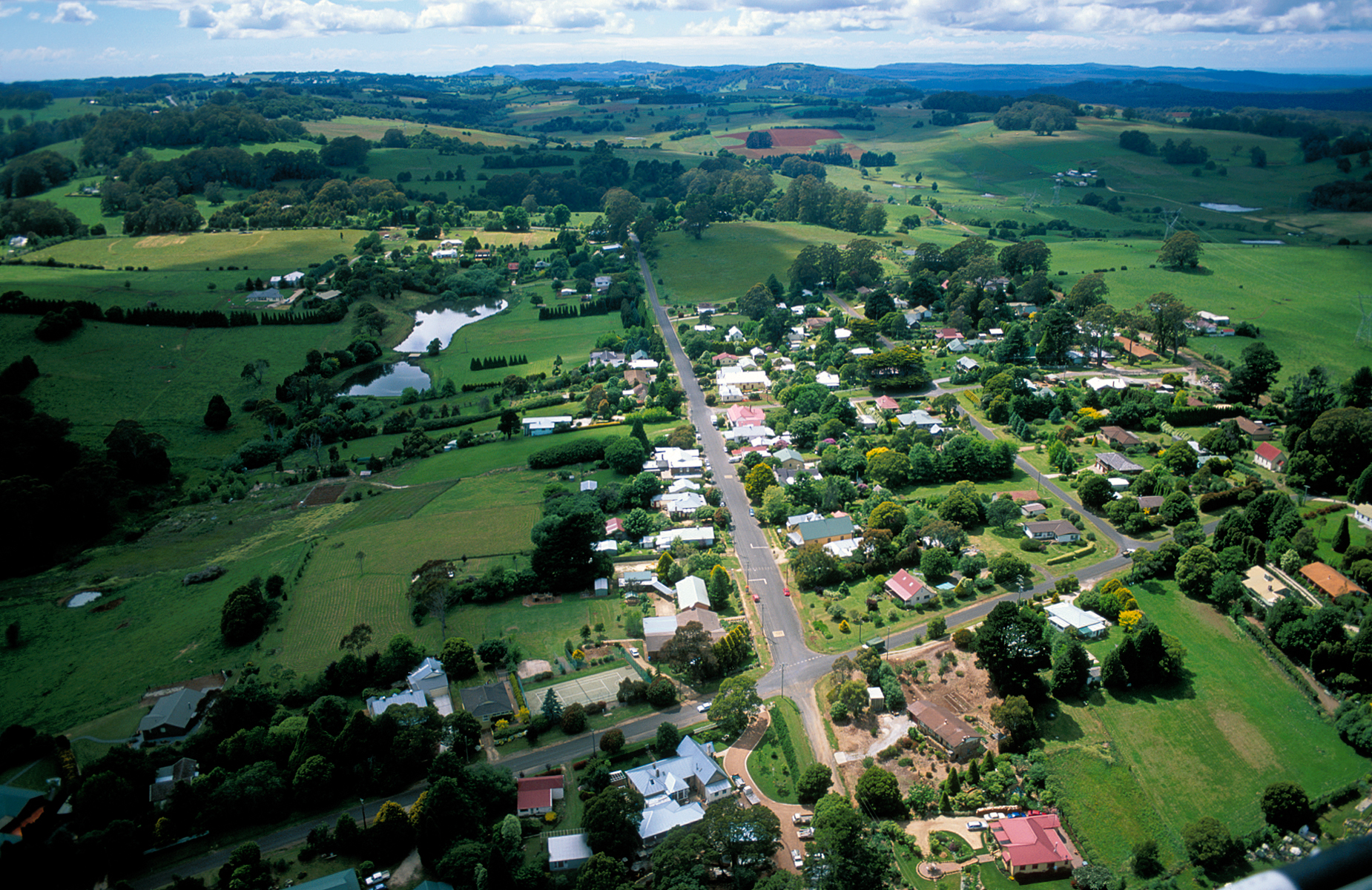
- Aerial photo
- Country: Australia
- State: New South Wales
- LGA: Wingecarribee Shire
- Location: 139 km (86 mi) SW of Sydney; 16 km (9.9 mi) ESE of Moss Vale; 87 km (54 mi) ENE of Goulburn

Government
  - State electorate: Goulburn
  - Federal division: Whitlam
- Elevation: 760 m (2,490 ft)

Population
  - Total: 270 (UCL 2021)
- Postcode: 2577
- County: Camden
- Parish: Yarrunga
Localities around Burrawang
	Kangaloon
Avoca	Burrawang	Robertson
	Wildes Meadow

Burrawang (/ˈbʌrəwæŋ/ BURR-ə-wang) is a village in the Southern Highlands of New South Wales, Australia in Wingecarribee Shire.

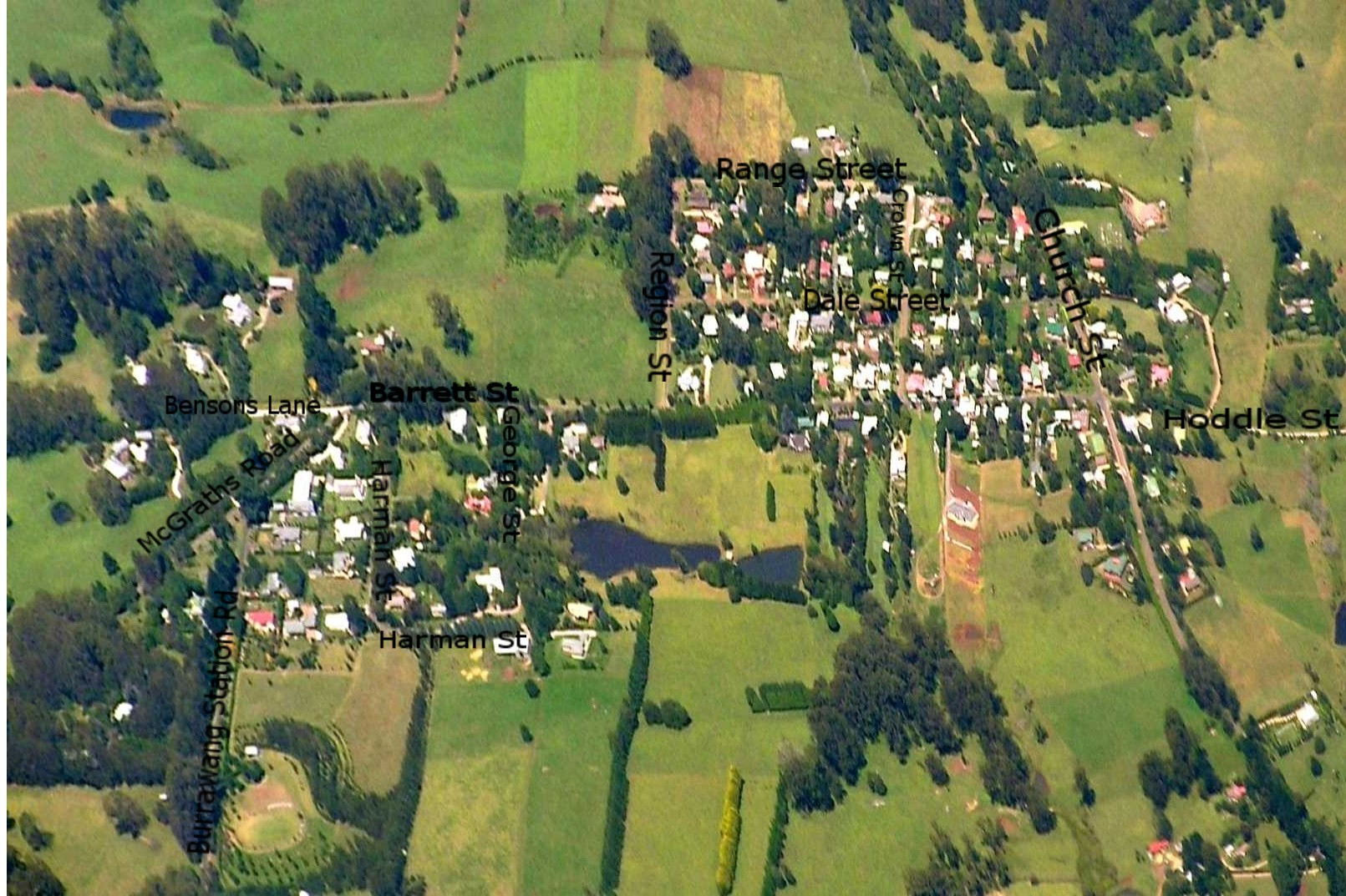
Map with streets named

It is situated high on a hill, 760m above sea level, midway between two reservoirs, the Wingecarribee and the Fitzroy.

== History ==
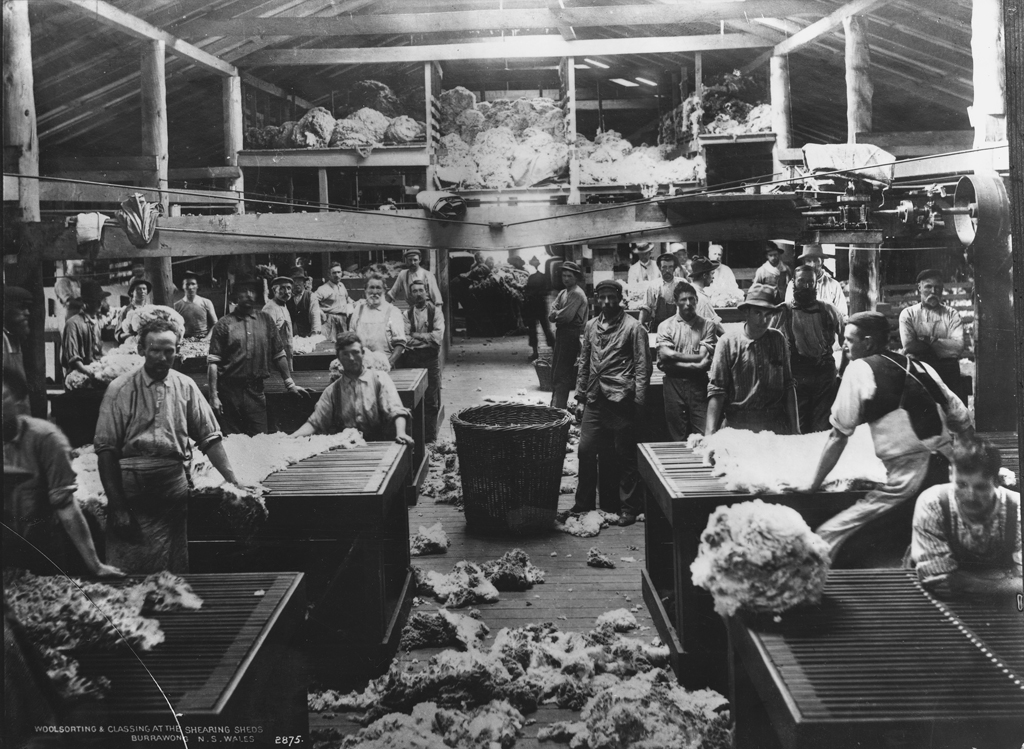
Wool classing and sorting at the shearing sheds of Burrawong, circa 1900.

Burrawang

Burrawang (Yarrawa) area is part of the traditional lands of the Tharawal people. The British naval surgeon Charles Throsby (1777–1828), became a settler in the colony in 1802 at the age of 31 and from 1804 served in the colonial medical establishment in the Newcastle area until 1809. He, along with his 58-year-old assistant Joseph Wild were mapping what is now known as the Moss Vale and Sutton Forest area and were commissioned to find an overland route from there to Jervis Bay as well as to plan and oversee the construction of a road to Goulburn Plains.

Throsby became the first landowner in what is now the Southern Highlands area in 1819 developing a cattle station which is now a museum open for public inspection called Throsby Park just off the Illawarra Highway in Moss Vale. This extremely capable pioneer became a member of the Legislative Council in 1825.

Surveyor Robert Hoddle and a gang of convicts cut a bridle path down the escarpment in 1830 as part of a track joining Cowpastures (Camden) to Kiama and Gerringong.

Sometime during this era the natural attributes of the Yarrawa Brush region came to their attention with its exotic rain forest and rich volcanic soil. This later became public knowledge and in 1859 the first land grant was issued in what is now the pretty hamlet of Wildes Meadow (a derivative of the name Wild’s meadow).

In 1865 the first post office was established at Burrawang, which was named after the native palm once plentiful in the area. Shortly thereafter came the first school, originally an Anglican establishment, which in 1876 was replaced by the first public school at the ‘Old School House’ (now a private residence).

In what is now Church Street the three churches were established around this time; Catholic 1875, Anglican 1886 and Presbyterian in 1888 (now a residential dwelling).

Major industries at the time included dairying, potatoes and vegetable growing, plus flour and timber milling. Burrawang also had a newspaper; the Burrawang Herald and the hall boasted an active social calendar including an annual ball.

Burrawang remained the major development in the Yarrawa Brush for some years but Robertson took over sometime in the late 1880s with the advent of a more direct road to Moss Vale the neighbouring development of Robertson started to overtake as the key settlement in the region. Once Macquarie Pass was opened in 1898, Burrawang became somewhat isolated.

== Population ==
In the 2016 census, there were 361 people in Burrawang. 80.1% of people were born in Australia and 88.1% of people spoke only English at home. The most common response for religion was No Religion at 31.1%. According to the 2021 census, there were 431 people living at Burrawang.

== Mythology of the Burrawang Bunyip ==
There is a swamp outside the town that is home to the legendary Burrawang Bunyip. It is said to roam around at night. It is rumoured to kill cattle and if anyone wanted to capture the bunyip, it will disappear.
