= Wingecarribee Shire =

- Local government area
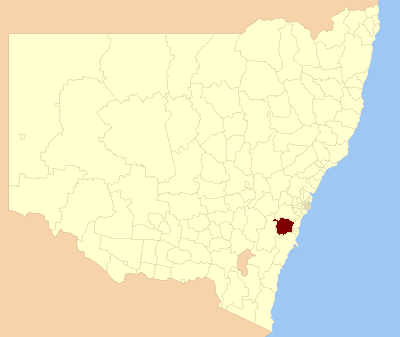
- Location in New South Wales

- Interactive map of Wingecarribee Shire
- Coordinates: 34°28′S 150°25′E
- Country: Australia
- State: New South Wales
- Region: Southern Highlands, Capital Country
- Established: 1 January 1981
- Council seat: Moss Vale

Government
  - Mayor: Jesse Fitzpatrick
  - State electorates: Goulburn; Wollondilly
  - Federal division: Whitlam

Area
  - Total: 2,689 km^{2} (1,038 sq mi)

Population
  - Totals: 47,882 (2016 census); 50,493 (2018 est.)
  - Density: 17.807/km^{2} (46.119/sq mi)
- Website: Wingecarribee Shire
LGAs around Wingecarribee Shire
| Upper Lachlan | Wollondilly | Wollongong |
| Goulburn | Wingecarribee Shire | Shellharbour |
| Goulburn | Shoalhaven | Kiama & Shoalhaven |

Wingecarribee Shire is the local government area of the Southern Highlands in the state of New South Wales, Australia. The Wingecarribee Shire is around 110 kilometres (70 mi) southwest of Sydney and is part of regional Capital Country and to some extent can be considered part of the Southern Tablelands.

Wingecarribee Shire covers an area of 2,700 square kilometres (1,000 sq mi) that is typically referred to as the Southern Highlands. Wingecarribee Shire is an important catchment area for water supply to Sydney, Wollongong and the Northern Shoalhaven.

The Council seat and Chambers is in Moss Vale. However, the centre of commerce of the Shire is in Bowral.

The Shire came into existence on 1 January 1981 as an amalgamation of the three previous local government areas that made up the Southern Highlands; Mittagong Shire (itself an amalgamation of Nattai Shire and Mittagong Municipality), Bowral Municipality and the former Wingecarribee Shire (based in Moss Vale).

In 2012, the Wingecarribee Shire Council won a landmark class action against Lehman Brothers Australia in the Federal Court after it was found that Lehman Brothers failed to give sound financial advice to the Wingecarribee Shire and other councils through exposure to high-risk investments known as collateralised debt obligations. Wingecarribee Council suffered A$1.5 million of losses on its investments. The Federal Court found that the council was entitled to an initial award of A$9 million. In 2016 Council announced they had recovered $9.5 million of the $11 million in total losses, recovering 85.6% of all losses. Council's total legal costs of $724,894 were also recovered.

Before the council was suspended in 2021 and an administrator was appointed, the mayor of Wingecarribee Shire was Duncan Gair. On 20 May 2021, Lisa Miscamble was appointed General Manager.

== Major towns and villages ==
The major towns in the Shire are Mittagong, Bowral, Moss Vale, Robertson and Bundanoon.

Villages include: Alpine, Aylmerton, Avoca, Balaclava, Balmoral Village, Belanglo, Berrima, Braemar, Bullio, Burradoo, Burrawang, Canyonleigh, Colo Vale, East Kangaloon, Exeter, Fitzroy Falls, Glenquarry, High Range, Hill Top, Joadja, Kangaloon, Manchester Square, Mandemar, Medway, Meryla, Mount Murray, New Berrima, Paddys River, Penrose, Renwick, Wattle Ridge, Welby, Werai, Wildes Meadow, Willow Vale, Wingello, Woodlands and Yerrinbool.

== Etymology ==
The current shire retains the name of the former Wingecarribee Shire because the Wingecarribee River is one of the most significant geographical features that is found in all the three previous local government areas that made up the Highlands prior to amalgamation.

The word Wingecarribee is from the Dharawal language (an Indigenous Australian language) which loosely translates into "a flight of birds", or "waters to rest beside". Moreover, the term "Wingecarribee" was used as the name of the area by the first settlers of the area, the Oxley Family (See, History of Bowral) and Governor Macquarie in 1816 recorded it as "Winge Karribee". In 1838, the contemporary spelling was adapted by Surveyor Mitchell.

== Geology and geography ==
The Shire is crossed by the Hume Highway and the Southern Highlands railway line.

The pattern of development is one of small towns and villages. The eastern parts of the Shire are bounded by the Illawarra escarpment and Morton National Park, with some remnant rainforest and heathland. The north of the Shire is characterised by rugged eucalypt bushland, with gullies, gorges and sandy soils. This area forms part of the catchment for Sydney's water supply and two major storage dams (Avon and Nepean Dams) are in this area. The dams cannot be accessed by any roads within the Wingecarribee Shire but by roads leading off south-east of the Wollondilly Shire. The Wollondilly and Wingecarribee Rivers flow through the west of the Shire, through deep sandstone valleys and much of this area forms part of the catchment for Warragamba Dam. The south of the Shire is bounded by Uringalla Creek and is a sandstone plateaux dissected by deep gorges.

Wingecarribee Swamp is home to the remaining population of the endangered Giant dragonfly and Wingecarribee Leek Orchid.

== Demographics ==
=== Population ===
At the 2016 census, the Wingecarribee Shire had an estimated population of 47,882 and has grown from 40,636 at the 2001 census, a growth rate 1.1% per annum.

The population density is 17.8 person/km^{2}. The Shire is relatively homogenous with an Australian-born population making up 77.1% of the population. Indigenous Australians make up 2.0% of the population. 88.4% of the population speak English at home.

=== Workforce ===
The Shire's workforce is at a current estimate of 18,919 residents, around 40% of Shire's entire population. The Shire's workforce are 14.7% managers, 19.3% professionals, 16.2% technicians and trades workers, 9.2% community and personal service workers, 12.5% clerical and administrative workers, 9.5% sales workers, 6.3 machinery operators and drivers, and 10.7% labourers. At the 2006 census, the average median income for the workforce of the Shire was $43,052. The workforce are primarily employed in four main industries: 16% in retail trading, 12% in manufacturing, 11% in health and community services, and 9% in construction. The workforce predominately works within the Shire, with 77% of the workforce working within the Shire. Moreover, 3% travel to nearby Wollongong for employment and 20% work in Sydney. Educationally, 40% of residents of the Shire are qualified with post High School certification in which 11% hold a University Degree and 28% qualified with a Diploma or Certificate.

At the 2006 census the Shire had an unemployment rate of 4.3%.

=== Housing and residential ===
Separate and detached housing make up the majority of the housing in the Shire at 90.7%. The rest is semi-detached/townhouse at 5.9% and apartments and units at 1.8%.

== Council ==
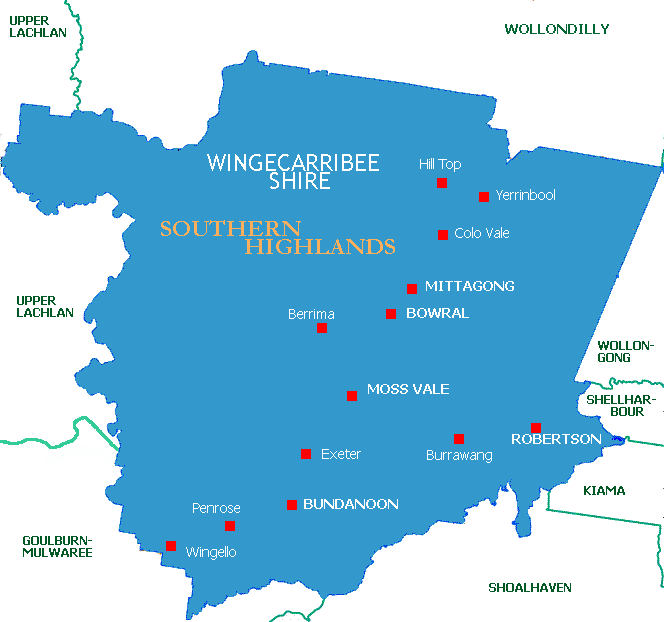
Wingecarribee Shire & Southern Highlands

=== Composition and election method ===
Wingecarribee Shire is composed of nine councillors elected proportionally. All councillors are elected for a fixed four-year term of office. The mayor is elected by the councillors at the first meeting of the council. The most recent election was held on 10 September 2016. The council was suspended by the Minister for Local Government and gazetted on 12 March 2021 at 12:35pm.

The composition of the council prior to it being suspended by the Minister for Local Government on 12 March 2021 was as follows:

| Party | Councillors |
|---|---|
| Independents | 7 |
| Labor | 1 |
| Total | 8 |

The council elected in 2016 and suspended in 2021, in order of election, was:

| Councillor | Party | Notes |
|---|---|---|
| Duncan Gair | Independent | Mayor |
| Graham McLaughlin | Labor | |
| Grahame Andrews | Independent | Deputy Mayor |
| Larry Whipper | Independent | |
| Garry Turland | Independent | Resigned 12 March 2021 |
| Ken Halstead | Independent | Resigned 9 March 2021 |
| Ian Scandrett | Independent | |
| Peter Nelson | Independent | |
| Gordon Markwart | Greens | Resigned 4 August 2020 |

=== Past mayors ===
In 1981, the first shire president was David Wood and the shire clerk was Harold Jopling.

- Duncan Gair
- Gordon Lewis 2004
- Dr Sara Murray 2012
- Philip Yeo
- Juliet Arkwright

== Election results ==
=== 2024 ===
2024 New South Wales local elections: Wingecarribee
| Party | Candidate | Votes | % | ±% |
|---|---|---|---|---|
| Fresh Vision Youthfully Driven | 1. Jesse Fitzpatrick (elected 1); 2. Erin Foley (elected 3); 3. Therese Duffy (elected 4); 4. James Farrell (elected 9); 5. Sharon Fitzpatrick; 6. Andrew Buttfield; 7. Mark Hughes; 8. Andrew Phillips | 13,421 | 41.1 | +41.1 |
| Representing Our Community | 1. Rachel Russell (elected 2); 2. David Rapley; 3. Joshua Sloss; 4. Antony Dubber; 5. Shardae Ewart; 6. Ryan Elphick; 7. James Salter; 8. Glen Jenkins; 9. Jillian Cockram | 4,217 | 12.9 | +12.9 |
| Greens | 1. Heather Champion (elected 5); 2. Erin Levee; 3. Yash Mash; 4. Claire Hall; 5. Clive West; 6. Maree Byrne; 7. Gregory Olsen; 8. Jenny Webster; 9. Sarah Cains | 2,675 | 8.2 | −1.5 |
| Labor | 1. David Kent (elected 6); 2. Penny Newlove; 3. Dean Cowgill; 4. Jeffrey Lapidos; 5. Linda Mclaughlin | 2,625 | 8.0 | −8.2 |
| Let's Get It Right | 1. Nicole Smith (elected 8); 2. Bronwyn Tregenza; 3. Thomas Farquhar; 4. Samuel Jones; 5. Alison Courts; 6. Kristie Phelan | 2,319 | 7.1 | +7.1 |
| Wingecarribee First | 1. Sara Moylan (elected 7); 2. Sabrina Venish; 3. Ian Bollen; 4. Stephen Wentworth (Ind. Nat); 5. Hamilton Becher; 6. Valentine Tyson (Ind. Nat) | 2,307 | 7.1 | +7.1 |
| Duncan Gair Team | 1. Duncan Gair; 2. Donna Jensen; 3. Gordon Lewis; 4. Peter Nelson; 5. David Reid; 6. Douglas Webb | 2,048 | 6.3 | −12.6 |
| Libertarian | 1. Raymond Khoury; 2. Robert Thomas; 3. Alan Stockman; 4. Andrew Brough; 5. James Brough | 2,033 | 6.3 | +6.3 |
| Independent Liberal | 1. Juliet Arkwright; 2. Julia McKay; 3. Sam Zilinskas; 4. Ken Street; 5. Colin Maslen; 6. Amanda Lynch | 966 | 3.0 | +3.0 |
| Total formal votes | | 32,611 | 93.9 | |
| Informal votes | | 2,107 | 6.1 | |
| Turnout | | 34,718 | 86.4 | |

== Local media ==
Weekly paid local newspapers, Southern Highland News and Southern Highlands Express, closed down in early 2025. The Southern Wire covers regional news including in the Southern Highlands, Wollondilly and Southern Tablelands. Local news is published online through The Bowral News. Commercial radio station is broadcast via stations 2ST 102.9 and Highland FM 107.1.

== See also ==
- Local government areas of New South Wales
