= Robertson, New South Wales =

Robertson
- Town
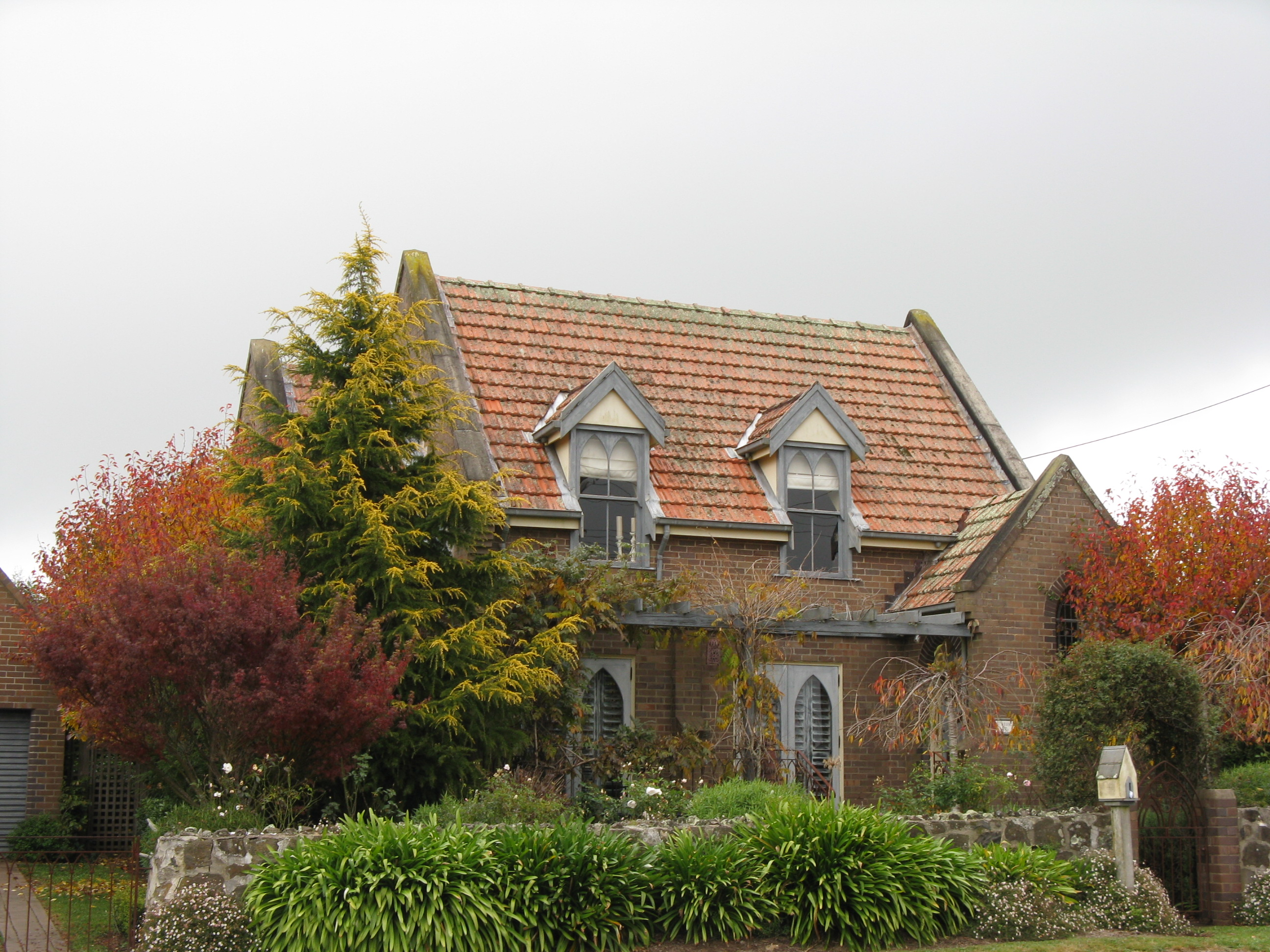
- Historic house in Robertson

- Coordinates: 34°35′S 150°35′E
- Country: Australia
- State: New South Wales
- Region: Southern Highlands
- LGA: Wingecarribee Shire
- Location: 140 km (87 mi) SW of Sydney CBD; 47 km (29 mi) SW of Wollongong

Government
  - State electorate: Goulburn
  - Federal division: Whitlam
- Elevation: 731 m (2,398 ft)

Population
  - Total: 1,476 (UCL 2021)
- Postcode: 2577
- County: Camden
- Parish: Yarrawa, Kangaloon
Localities around Robertson
Kangaloon	East Kangaloon	Mount Murray
Burrawang	Robertson	Macquarie Pass
Wildes Meadow	Upper Kangaroo Valley	Pheasant Ground

Robertson is a town in the Southern Highlands of New South Wales, Australia, in Wingecarribee Shire. The town is located on the edge of an elevated plateau (the Illawarra escarpment) about 35 km (22 mi) from the coast.

Robertson is known for its high annual rainfall and fertile soil. It was previously covered by an extensive temperate rainforest, most of which has been cleared for farming though remnants such as Robertson Nature Reserve still exist. The town is colloquially known as "Robbo" by the locals.

The town is surrounded by lush pasture used for beef and dairy production. It was once famous for cheese production; its distance from, and poor transport to, the Sydney markets meant that in the early days fresh milk was not a viable industry and so the key dairy industries were butter and cheese. The remnants of the cheese industry are seen with one of the old cheese factories remaining in the town; it has been converted into a commercial row of shops. There is also the remnants of an old butter factory at the western end of town. Robertson is now more widely known for potato growing and is the home of the "Big Potato". The Big Potato was built in the 1970s by a local potato grower. Robertson is also where the 1995 movie Babe was filmed.

== History ==
Robertson is named after former Premier of New South Wales Sir John Robertson, whose 1861 Land Act cleared the way for the establishment of the town. Before then it was called Yarrawa Bush.

== Population ==
According to the 2021 census, there were 2,017 people living in Robertson.

At the 2016 census, Robertson and its surrounding area had a population of 1,865. 76.7% of people were born in Australia. The next most common country of birth was England at 5.6%. 89.0% of people spoke only English at home. The most common responses for religion were No Religion 28.9%, Anglican 25.2% and Catholic 17.2%.

== Events ==
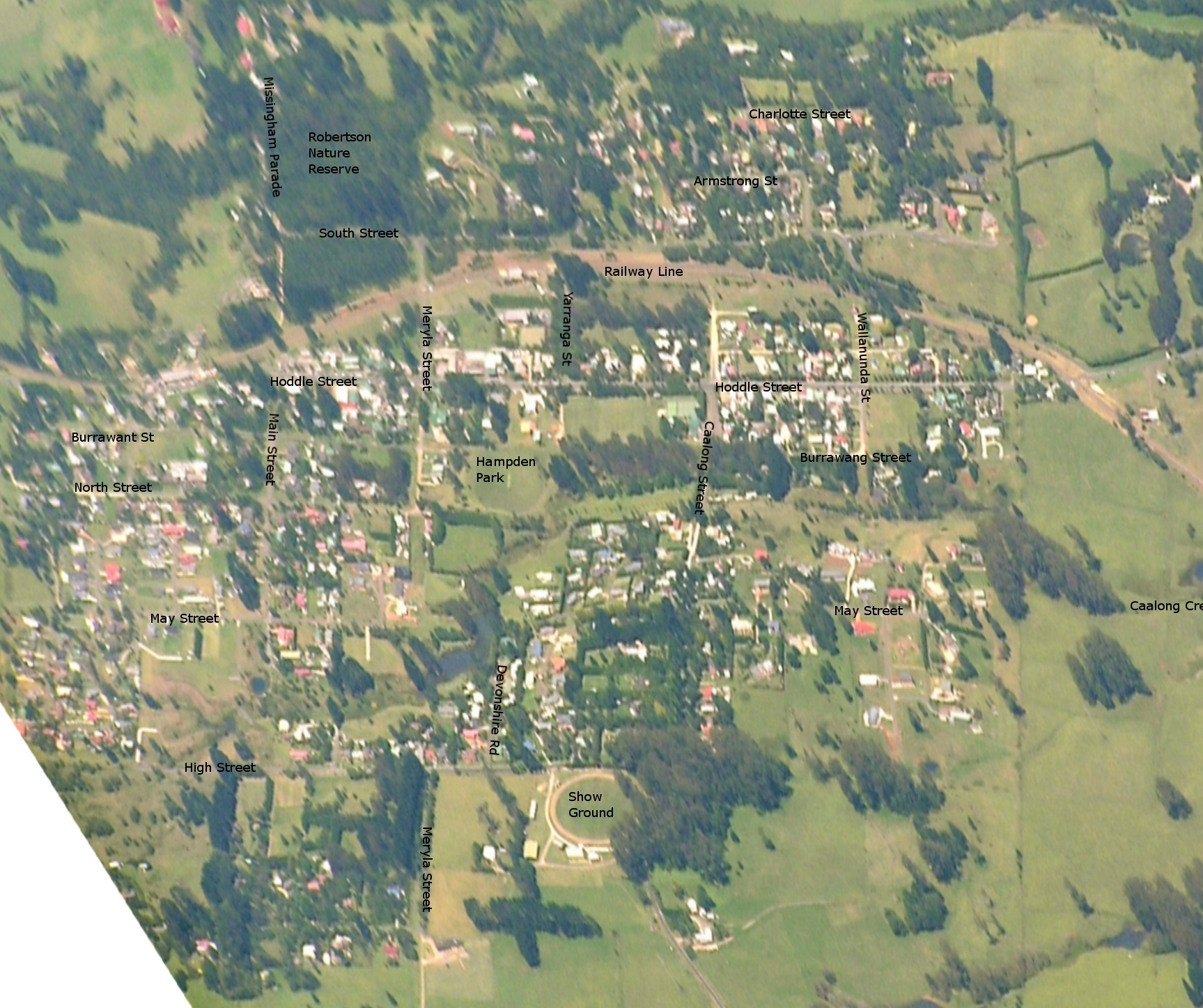
Aerial photo with street names

Though the date varies, the Robertson Show is often held between February and April on a Friday and Saturday of each year. There are many games and showcases during the two days it is held, with "The Great Australian Potato Race" occurring on Saturday, alongside the demolition derby and fireworks show at night.

In spring Robertson holds a spring festival, with local gardens open to the public.

== Attractions ==
=== Robertson Hotel ===
Robertson is home to the "Robertson Hotel", a popular hotel and wedding venue. The hotel was originally built in 1924, opening as Hotel Robertson. It had a nine-hole golf course, two tennis courts, croquet, lawn bowls, billiards, fishing, hunting, horse riding, and an onsite mechanic who looked after guests' cars during their stay. The hotel won the "Most luxurious hotel in the Commonwealth" award in 1925, and was the first hotel in Australia to have phone lines to every room.

The hotel was built to draw some of the Sydneysiders, who in the past retreated to the cool climate of the Southern Highlands to escape the heat of a Sydney summer and enjoy the beauty of the countryside. It was a success and the developer went on to subdivide and develop the local area, less successfully.

In 1930 the hotel was sold and marketed as an exclusive country club and renamed Ranelagh Country Club after Ranelagh Gardens in London. However, the Great Depression made those plans short-lived.

In the buildup to World War II the hotel became a WAAAF training base, serving as a signals base and a training area for budding pilots. After World War II, the hotel was used as a hospice for returned pilots.

The building sold again in 1947 and became St Anthony's College, a Franciscan friary and seminary; it was also used as a school and accommodation house run by the monks. It was during this period that the stained glass windows, rock walls and fountains were built. These are still in the building and around the gardens and grounds.

The hotel has its own railway platform on the Moss Vale – Unanderra line called Ranelagh House, which is still used today.

In 1972 the monks moved to smaller premises in Campbelltown and the building returned to its original use as a hotel, named Ranelagh House.

The hotel was sold again in late 2007, and was renamed Fountaindale Grand Manor and Ranelagh Gardens, undergoing major renovations and refurbishments. Recently it was renamed to Robertson Hotel.

In 2022, the hotel played host to the Network 10 reality game show, The Traitors - during which the contestants stayed at the hotel while playing a murder-mystery-themed game styled similar to the party game Mafia. The show returned to the hotel for the second season in 2023. The series did not return to the hotel when it was revived in 2026.

=== Illawarra Fly ===
On 15 March 2008, the Illawarra Fly Tree Top Walk opened to the public. It is similar to the Otway Fly, in Victoria. It is perched on the Illawarra escarpment at Knights Hill, located east of Robertson. The tree top walk is joined with an observation outdoor tower with views of Wollongong.

=== The Big Potato ===
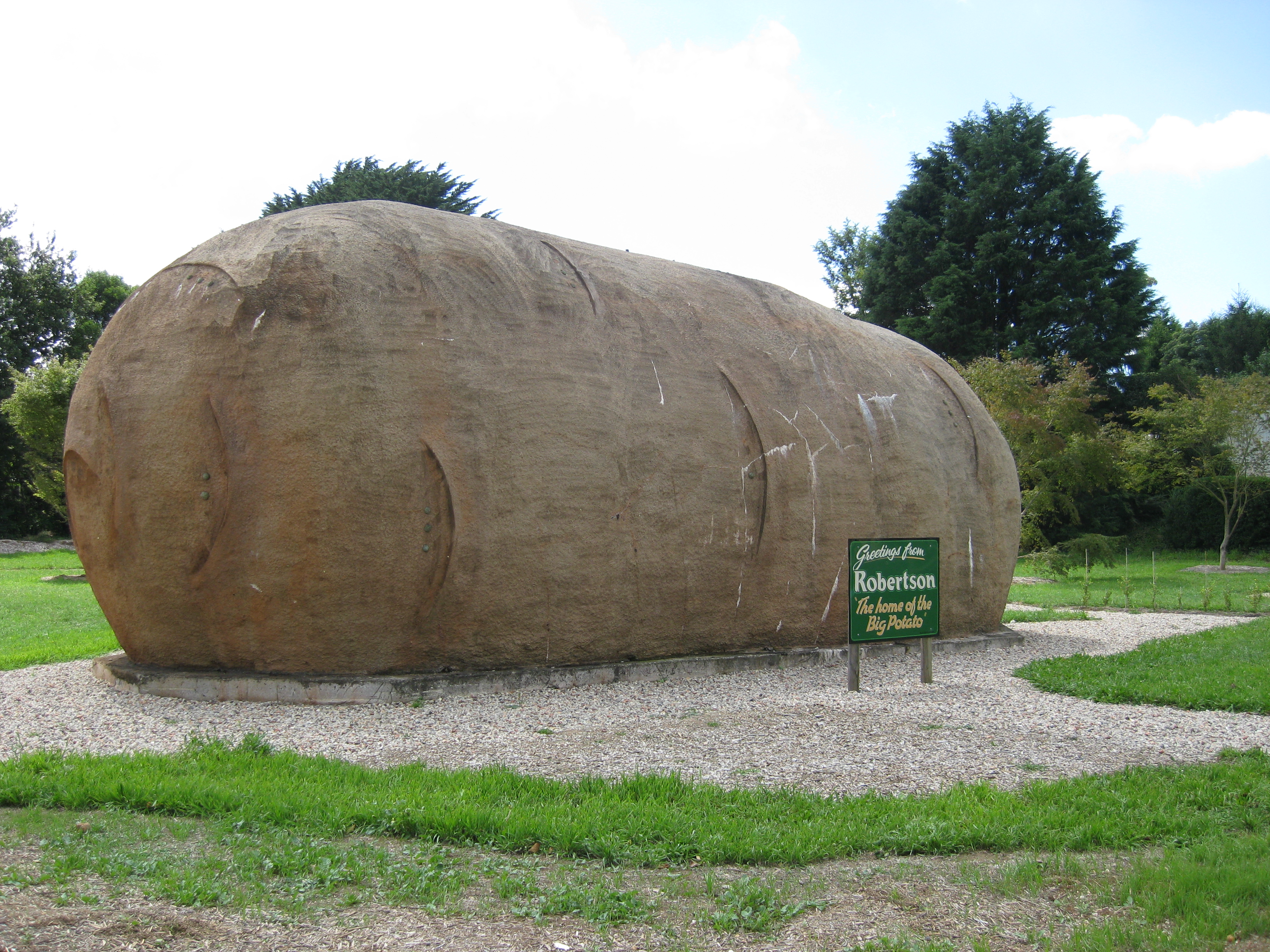
The Big Potato in 2009

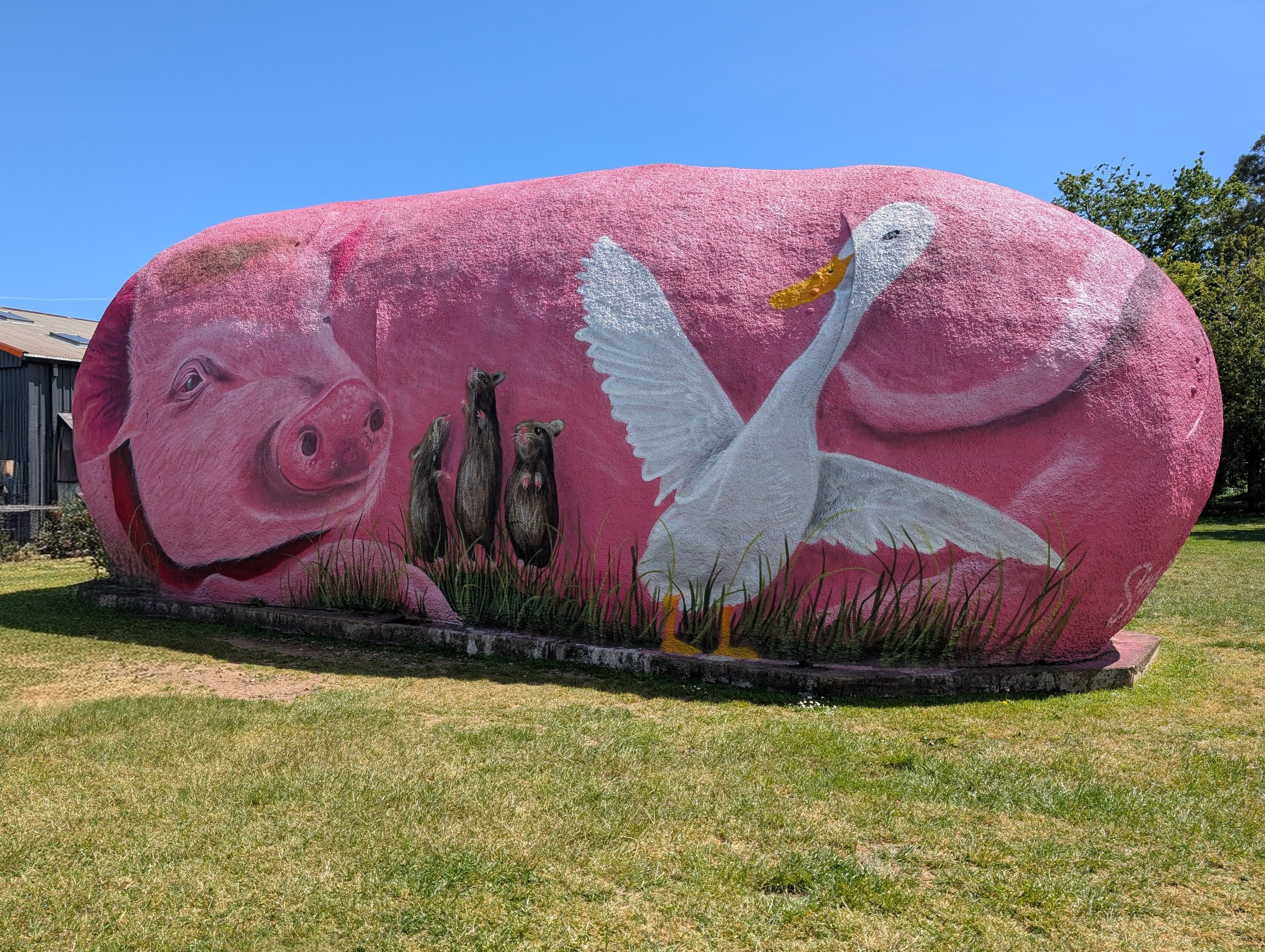
The "Pig" Potato in 2025, painted pink to commemorate the 30th anniversary of the movie Babe

Built in 1977 by local potato grower and shire councillor Jim Mauger from local soil mixed with cement, the Big Potato originally sat alone in a bare field. It was modelled on the Sebago potato and is approximately 10×4 m (33×13 ft). Originally it was intended to house a museum or kiosk, but this never happened. The Big Potato, alone in its field, appears in the 1990s classic film Babe.

During the International Year of the Potato in 2008, volunteers from the community led by Judy and Allan Hollis decided to refurbish the potato and the landscape around it. Over time they raised funds to erect picnic benches, and local nurseries pitched in with donations of plants and their labour. Artist Ben Quilty even helped plant some daffodils.

In 2012 Mauger said that he was forced to sell the land because of rising rates that he could not afford, as the land on which it sits is zoned for commercial use. The parents of playwright and journalist Melanie Tait, who grew up in Robertson, bought the land and the potato, as it lay adjacent to their supermarket. Her father, Neil who was 62 at the time, raised a mortgage on the land, to save his business as well as the Big Potato. According to Melanie, Neil loves the Big Potato. In September 2022, the Tait family sold the land. When Melanie announced the news on Twitter, her friends responded with some witty puns, such as "This news has mashed me up. I'm wedged between joy and sadness. Is there no way we could hash this out? Perhaps if we all chip in?".

The Big Potato became a source of amusement across Australia from the beginning. It has been dubbed "big turd" by some, and in 2010 vandals created a face on it by sticking on eyes, nose, and mouth made out of papier-mâché. It has featured in the arts and popular culture several times, including:

- 1997: Featured in the feature film Babe
- 2021: Voted Australia's "Shittest Big Thing" in a public vote held by Shit Towns of Australia
- 2022: Filming of a scene in Apple TV show ROAR, with Nicole Kidman and Judy Davis
- 2022: Featured on Channel Ten show The Living Room
- 2023: Featured in the feature film The Appleton Ladies' Potato Race, based on Melanie Tait's play of the same name

In 2025 it was transformed into 'The Pig Potato' with a large mural of a pig covering it, this was to honour the 30 year anniversary of the film Babe which was filmed on family farms around Robertson. This pig, with the addition of Ferdinand the duck and three singing mice was painted by local artist Samuel Hall .

== Transport ==
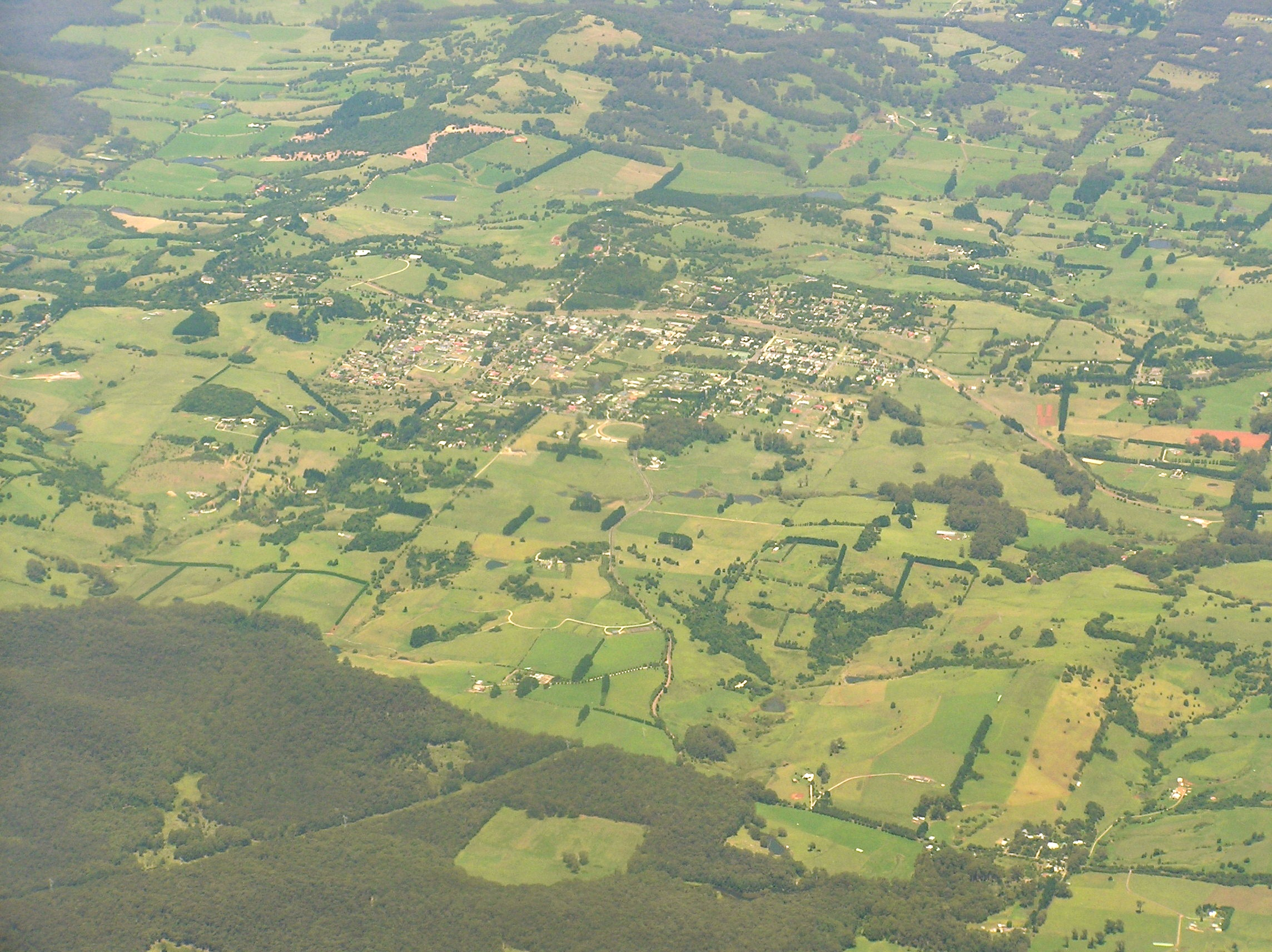
Aerial photo from north west

Robertson was served by a railway station on the Unanderra–Moss Vale railway line. The railway line is mainly used for freight. East Coast Heritage Rail operates its Cockatoo Run train on a monthly basis across the line from Sydney to Moss Vale and return (via Wollongong). Other heritage trains sometimes use the line, however no regular passenger services are present on the line.

NSW TrainLink buses travel along the Illawarra Highway, linking the Southern Highlands to Wollongong. The Illawarra Highway winds down the escarpment via the Macquarie Pass. Robertson would be impacted by an upgrade or replacement to Macquarie Pass. Despite some Illawarra and Highland residents strongly supporting an improvement to the link between Robertson and Albion Park, no government has shown any interest in such a project.

== Facilities and services ==
The Robertson Rural Fire Brigade has been officially active since 5 February 1939, but is believed to have been formed by local people on 14 January, in response to catastrophic bushfires at that time.

== Heritage listings ==
Robertson has a number of heritage-listed sites, including the Wingecarribee Swamp.

== Notable residents ==
- Noeline Brown, Australian entertainer
- Bob Dwyer, former Australia national rugby union team coach
- Ian Hindmarsh, brother of Nathan and retired National Rugby League (NRL) player (born in Bowral)
- Nathan Hindmarsh, Parramatta Eels NRL player who grew up in the town (born in Bowral)
- Betty Klimenko, V8 Supercar Erebus Motorsport race team owner
- Brett Lee, Australian cricketer, owns property near town
- Miriam Margolyes, British-born actress, lived near the town for some years
- Ben Quilty, artist
- Kyle Sandilands, radio host
- Melanie Tait, playwright and journalist, who grew up in the town
- John Waters, English-born actor
- Emma Watkins, former Wiggles performer and actress
