= Kangaloon, New South Wales =

Kangaloon
- Town
- Coordinates: 34°33′S 150°32′E
- Country: Australia
- State: New South Wales
- Region: Southern Highlands
- LGA: Wingecarribee Shire
- Location: 140 km (87 mi) SW of Sydney; 16 km (9.9 mi) ESE of Bowral; 57 km (35 mi) WSW of Wollongong

Government
  - State electorate: Goulburn
  - Federal division: Whitlam
- Elevation: 814 m (2,671 ft)

Population
  - Total: 206 (SAL 2021)
- Postcode: 2576
- County: Camden
- Parish: Mittagong, Kangaloon
Localities around Kangaloon
| Glenquarry | Mount Lindsey | East Kangaloon |
| Glenquarry | Kangaloon | East Kangaloon |
| Burrawang | Burrawang | Robertson |

Kangaloon /kæŋɡəluːn/ is a village in the Southern Highlands of New South Wales, Australia, in Wingecarribee Shire.

At the 2016 census, Kangaloon had a population of 151. At the 2021 census, there were 206 residents.

== Etymology ==
Kangaloon is Aboriginal for "kangaroo landing ground".

== Notable people ==
- Michelle Bridges
