= Manchester Square, New South Wales =

Manchester Square
- Town
- Coordinates: 34°36′S 150°24′E
- Country: Australia
- State: New South Wales
- Region: Southern Highlands
- LGA: Wingecarribee Shire
- Location: 140 km (87 mi) SW of Sydney; 9 km (5.6 mi) SE of Moss Vale; 77 km (48 mi) ENE of Goulburn; 69 km (43 mi) WSW of Wollongong

Government
  - State electorate: Goulburn
  - Federal division: Whitlam
- Elevation: 667 m (2,188 ft)

Population
  - Total: 27 (SAL 2021)
- Postcode: 2577
- County: Camden
- Parish: Yarrunga, Bong Bong
Localities around Manchester Square
Moss Vale	Moss Vale	Moss Vale
Werai	Manchester Square	Fitzroy Falls
Werai	Meryla	Fitzroy Falls

Manchester Square is a locality in the Southern Highlands of New South Wales, Australia, in Wingecarribee Shire.

According to the 2016 census, the population of Manchester Square was 19. At the 2021 census, there were 27 residents.
