= Parish of Nattery =

Coordinates: 34°45′S 149°53′E

Nattery Parish New South Wales
- LGA(s): Goulburn Mulwaree
- County: Argyle
- Division: Eastern
Lands administrative divisions around Nattery Parish:
Norrong	Norrong	Billyrambija
Towrang	Nattery Parish	Marulan
Towrang	Jerrara	Jerrara

The Parish of Nattery is a parish of Argyle County located between Goulburn and Marulan in New South Wales. It is just east of the village of Towrang and includes the locality of Carrick. The Wollondilly River is the boundary in the north-west. Jerraba creek is part of the boundary in the south-east. The Southern Highlands railway line runs through the northern end of the parish, to the east of the Wollondilly river. The Hume Highway passes through the middle of the parish.

Portion 103 of the parish was granted to Joseph Peters, on which the Woolpack Inn was built and licensed on 17 June 1834.
