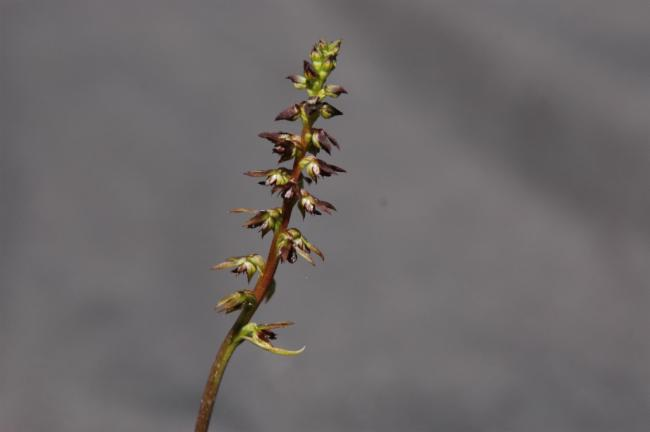
- Genoplesium plumosum near Goulburn

Conservation status
- Endangered (EPBC Act)

Scientific classification
- Kingdom: Plantae
- Clade: Tracheophytes
- Clade: Angiosperms
- Clade: Monocots
- Order: Asparagales
- Family: Orchidaceae
- Subfamily: Orchidoideae
- Tribe: Diurideae
- Genus: Genoplesium
- Species: G. plumosum

Binomial name
- Genoplesium plumosum (Rupp) D.L.Jones & M.A.Clem.

= Genoplesium plumosum =

Tallong midge orchid

Species of orchid

Genoplesium plumosum, commonly known as the Tallong midge-orchid or plumed midge-orchid, is a species of orchid endemic to New South Wales. It is a small orchid only known from a few sites near the towns of Tallong and Wingello on the Southern Tablelands and is only relatively easy to find for about a month, when it flowers. It has been classified as "Endangered" under the EPBC Act.

== Description ==
Genoplesium plumosum is a terrestrial, perennial, deciduous, sympodial herb, usually with a few inconspicuous, fine roots and a pair of more or less spherical tubers. The tubers are partly covered by a protective fibrous sheath which extends to the soil surface. There is a single cylindrical, glabrous leaf fused to the flowering stem. The leaf is 10–20 cm (4–8 in) long and the part which is free from the stem is 15–30 mm (0.6–1 in) long and ends below the flowers. The leaf of flowering plants is solid but the leaves on plants without flowers are hollow.

The inflorescence is a spike 10–30 mm (0.4–1 in) tall, with between one and eight, non-resupinate flowers. The flowers are more or less pendulous, moderately crowded, 8 mm × 5 mm (0.3 in × 0.2 in), greenish with purple stripes and have a purplish-red labellum. The dorsal sepal is narrowly egg-shaped, 6–7 mm (0.2–0.3 in) long, about 3 mm (0.1 in) wide, dished on the lower surface with smooth edges and a pointed tip. The lateral sepals are linear to lance-shaped, 7.5–9 mm (0.3–0.4 in) long, about 1 mm (0.04 in) wide and diverge from each other. The petals are narrow egg-shaped, 5.5–6.5 mm (0.2–0.3 in) long, about 1.5 mm (0.06 in) wide with a long, pointed tip. The labellum is above the column and stiffly hinged to it, and is oblong, about 5 mm (0.2 in) long, 2 mm (0.08 in) wide with hairy edges and a pointed tip. The callus is narrow egg-shaped to lance-shaped and extends nearly to the tip of the labellum. Flowering usually occurs 4 to 6 weeks following summer or autumn rainfall. The fruit is a non-fleshy, dehiscent capsule containing hundreds of seeds.

== Taxonomy and naming ==
The first formal description of Prasophyllum plumosum was by Herman Rupp in 1942 from a specimen found near Kurnell and the description was published in The Victorian Naturalist. In 1989, David Jones and Mark Clements placed it and most other species of Prasophyllum into Genoplesium. In 2002 Jones and Clements have proposed moving all but one of Genoplesium back to Corunastylis but the move has not been widely accepted.

The specific epithet (plumosum) is a Latin word meaning "feathered".

== Distribution and habitat ==
Tallong midge-orchid grows among low shrubs in forest and in moss gardens over sandstone mainly between Sydney Harbour and Marulan.

== Conservation ==
Genoplesium plumosum has not been observed at the type location for more than 80 years and is now only known from a total area of 20 km^{2} (8 sq mi) and with a total population estimated in 2008 to be between 250 and 280 plants near Tallong and Wingello with a few individual plants in the Morton National Park. The main reasons for its decline have been land clearing and grazing by the introduced European Rabbit (Oryctolagus cuniculus). The species is now listed as "Critically Endangered" in terms of the EPBC Act.
