= Sutton Forest Parish =

Coordinates: 34°37′S 150°16′E

Sutton Forest Parish New South Wales
- LGA(s): Wingecarribee
- Region: Southern Highlands
- County: Camden
- Division: Eastern
Lands administrative divisions around Sutton Forest Parish:
Belanglo	Bong Bong	Bong Bong
Murrimba	Sutton Forest Parish	Meryla
Murrimba	Bundanoon	Meryla

The Parish of Sutton Forest is a parish of the County of Camden in the Southern Highlands region of New South Wales. It includes the land to the south and south-west of the small village centre presently known as Sutton Forest. The northern boundary of the parish is the Illawarra Highway and part of Canyonleigh Road. Part of Paddys River is the south-western boundary. The Southern Highlands railway line passes through the parish and is near the boundary in the east. The Hume Highway passes through a small part of the parish in the north-west. The parish includes the towns of Exeter and Bundanoon. The town of Bundanoon is at the southern edge of the Parish of Sutton Forest, with the Parish of Bundanoon just to the south.
