= Werai, New South Wales =

Werai
- Town
- Coordinates: 34°35′S 150°21′E
- Country: Australia
- State: New South Wales
- LGA: Wingecarribee Shire Council
- Location: 146 km (91 mi) SW of Sydney; 7 km (4.3 mi) S of Moss Vale; 67 km (42 mi) ESE of Goulburn; 71 km (44 mi) WSW of Wollongong

Government
  - State electorate: Goulburn
  - Federal division: Whitlam
- Elevation: 667 m (2,188 ft)

Population
  - Total: 98 (SAL 2021)
- Postcode: 2577
- County: Camden
- Parish: Bong Bong, Meryla
Localities around Werai
Sutton Forest	Moss Vale	Manchester Square
Exeter	Werai	Manchester Square
Exeter	Meryla	Meryla

Werai is a locality in the Southern Highlands of New South Wales, Australia, in Wingecarribee Shire.

According to the 2016 census, Werai had a population of 90. At the 2021 census, 98 people were living at Werai.

== See also ==
- Werai railway station
