= Paddys River, New South Wales =

Paddys River
- Town
- Coordinates: 34°39′S 150°7′E
- Country: Australia
- State: New South Wales
- Region: Southern Highlands
- LGA: Wingecarribee Shire
- Location: 157 km (98 mi) SW of Sydney; 31 km (19 mi) WSW of Moss Vale; 46 km (29 mi) E of Goulburn

Government
  - State electorate: Goulburn
  - Federal division: Whitlam
- Elevation: 599 m (1,965 ft)

Population
  - Total: 64 (SAL 2021)
- Postcode: 2577
- County: Camden
- Parish: Murrimba, Wingello
Localities around Paddys River
Brayton	Canyonleigh	Sutton Forest
Brayton	Paddys River	Penrose
Marulan	Wingello	Penrose

Paddys River is a locality in the Southern Highlands of New South Wales, Australia, in Wingecarribee Shire. The locality was previously known as Murrimba. It is south of Canyonleigh.

According to the 2016 census, there were 31 people living at Paddys River. At the 2021 census, the population had increased to 64.

The locality takes its name from the watercourse, Paddys River (Southern Highlands).

This locality should not be confused with another identically-named locality, in the Snowy Valleys Council Local Government Area.
