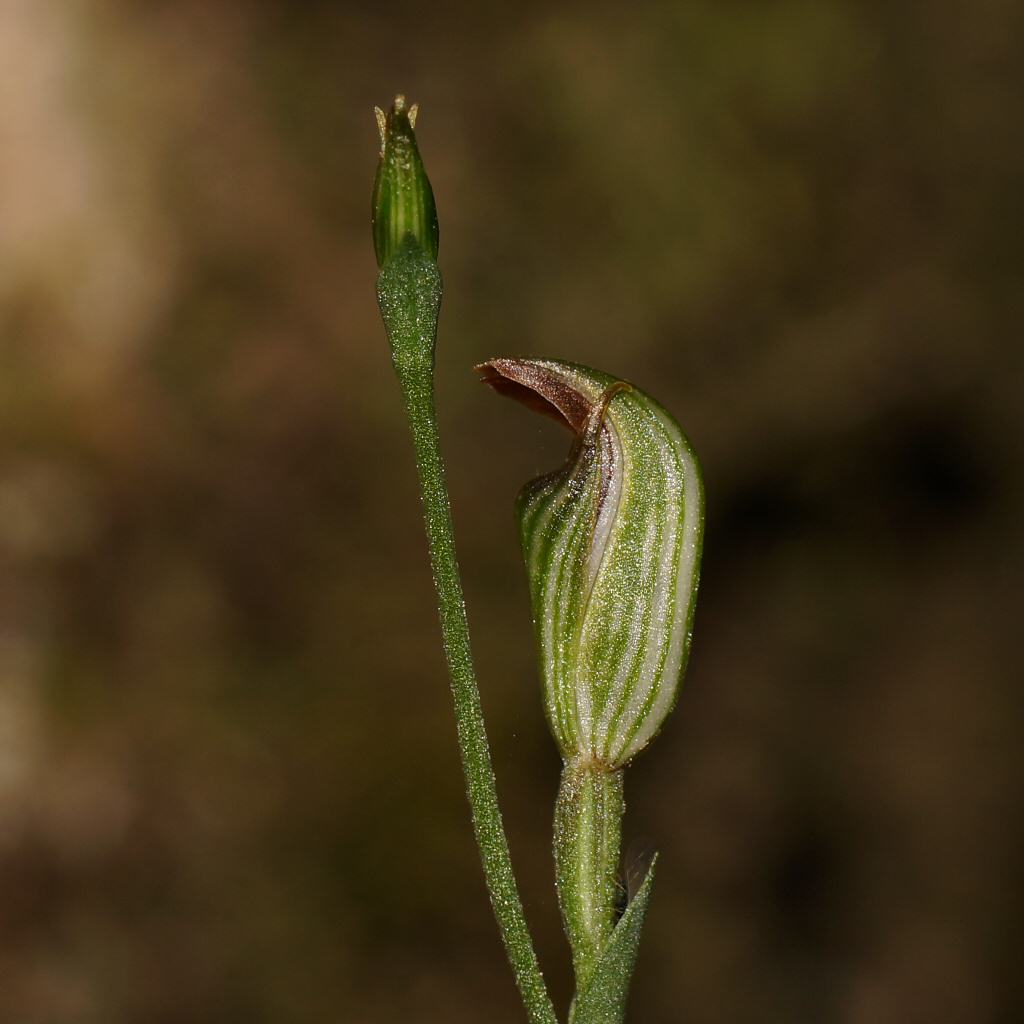
- Pterostylis ventricosa growing near Jervis Bay

Scientific classification
- Kingdom: Plantae
- Clade: Tracheophytes
- Clade: Angiosperms
- Clade: Monocots
- Order: Asparagales
- Family: Orchidaceae
- Subfamily: Orchidoideae
- Tribe: Cranichideae
- Genus: Pterostylis
- Species: P. ventricosa

Binomial name
- Pterostylis ventricosa (D.L.Jones) G.N.Backh.

Synonyms
- Speculantha ventricosa D.L.Jones

= Pterostylis ventricosa =

Species of orchid

Pterostylis ventricosa is a recently described, critically endangered species of orchid that is endemic to a small area of New South Wales. As with similar orchids, the flowering plants differ from those that are not flowering. The non-flowering plants have a rosette of leaves but the flowering plants lack a rosette at the base but have up to six tiny green, white and brown flowers.

== Description ==
Pterostylis ventricosa is a terrestrial, perennial, deciduous, herb with an underground tuber and when not flowering, a rosette of four to nine dark green, egg-shaped leaves which lie flat on the ground. Each leaf is 3–12 mm (0.1–0.5 in) long and 3–6 mm (0.1–0.2 in) wide. Flowering plants have up to six well-spaced flowers 10–13 mm (0.4–0.5 in) long and about 5 mm (0.2 in) wide borne on a thin, wiry spike 80–300 mm (3–10 in) high. One or two leaf rosettes are arranged on the side of the flowering spike. The flowers are green and white, swollen at the base and taper towards a bright reddish-brown tip. The dorsal sepal and petals are fused, forming a hood or "galea" over the column. The dorsal sepal is erect near the base but then curves forward and is 13–16 mm (0.5–0.6 in) long and 5–8 mm (0.2–0.3 in) wide. The petals are slightly longer than the dorsal sepal. The lateral sepals are erect, held closely against the galea with thread-like tips about 3mm long reaching just past the top of the galea. The labellum is about 5 mm (0.2 in) long, 2 mm (0.08 in) wide, dark brown and white, curved and barely visible above the sinus.

== Taxonomy and naming ==
This greenhood was first formally described in 2008 by D.L.Jones who gave it the name Speculantha ventricosa and published the description in The Orchadian. In 2010, Gary Backhouse changed the name to Pterostylis ventricosa. The specific epithet (ventricosa) mean "swollen", especially to one side.

== Distribution and habitat ==
This tiny greenhood mostly grows in tall forest with a dense understorey, but sometimes in disturbed areas, including roadsides. It occurs near Nowra, Tallong, Mittagong, in the Jervis Bay area, Shoalhaven and (discovered in May 2021) in the Southern Highlands of New South Wales.

== Ecology ==
While the exact processes are not clear, this orchid has a relationship with fungi in the soil (hence does well after wet weather), and it is thought that they could play a role in the ecosystem with insects and other pollinators.

== Conservation ==
Pterostylis ventricosa is classed as "critically endangered" under the New South Wales Biodiversity Conservation Act 2016 , the successor to the Threatened Species Conservation Act 1995. The main threats to the species are land clearing, disturbance by off-road vehicles, grazing by livestock and illegal collection.

The find of approximately about 170 plants in the Southern Highlands of New South Wales excited scientists, as they had previously only been found closer to the coast and not at such elevations. A spokesperson said that the find demonstrated that the New South Wales Government’s "Saving our Species" (SoS) program (which commits to increasing the number of threatened species that are secure in the wild in NSW for 100 years) was having a positive effect on biodiversity.
