= Pterostylis glyphida =

Scientific classification
- Kingdom: Plantae
- Clade: Tracheophytes
- Clade: Angiosperms
- Clade: Monocots
- Order: Asparagales
- Family: Orchidaceae
- Subfamily: Orchidoideae
- Tribe: Cranichideae
- Genus: Pterostylis
- Species: P. glyphida

Binomial name
- Pterostylis glyphida (D.L.Jones) G.N.Backh.

Synonyms
- Speculantha glyphida D.L.Jones

Species of orchid

Pterostylis glyphida is a species of orchid endemic to a small area of New South Wales. As with similar orchids, the flowering plants differ from those which are not flowering. The non-flowering plants have a rosette of leaves but flowering plants lack a rosette at the base, but have up to seven green, white and brown flowers, up to three open at a time.

== Description ==
Pterostylis glyphida is a terrestrial, perennial, deciduous, herb with an underground tuber and when not flowering, a rosette of three to six egg-shaped to arrow-head shaped leaves 3–12 mm (0.12–0.47 in) long and 3–6 mm (0.12–0.24 in) wide. When flowering, the plant has up to seven flowers, with up to three open at any time, on a flowering stem 80–350 mm (3.1–13.8 in) tall. Each flower is green and white near the base, dark to blackish brown near the tip, 10–13 mm (0.39–0.51 in) long and 4.5–5.0 mm (0.18–0.20 in) wide on a pedicel 1–4 mm (0.039–0.157 in) long. The dorsal sepal and petals are fused, forming a hood or "galea" over the column. The dorsal sepal is egg-shaped, 15–18 mm (0.59–0.71 in) long and 5–8 mm (0.20–0.31 in) wide, and boldy striped. The lateral sepals are erect, held closely against the galea with tapered, linear tips that just reach the top of the galea. The sinus between the bases of the lateral sepals is deeply notched and bulges forward. The petals are broadly oblong, 10–13 mm (0.39–0.51 in) long, 2.5–3.0 mm (0.098–0.118 in) long and dark brown, striped with white. The labellum is not visible above the sinus. Flowering occurs from February to April.

== Taxonomy ==
This orchid was first formally described in 2008 by David Jones who gave it the name Speculantha glyphida. The description was published in the journal The Orchadian from a specimen collected from Tallong Park Reserve in 2001. In 2010, Gary Backhouse changed the name to Pterostylis glyphida in The Victorian Naturalist. The specific epithet (glyphida) means "notched or grooved like an arrow".

== Distribution and habitat ==
Pterostylis glyphida grows in open areas in tall forest with a heathy understorey, and is only known from the type location, a site at St Georges Basin, and another at Sussex Inlet, in south-eastern New South Wales.
