= Eucalyptus imitans =

Illawarra stringybark

Scientific classification
- Kingdom: Plantae
- Clade: Tracheophytes
- Clade: Angiosperms
- Clade: Eudicots
- Clade: Rosids
- Order: Myrtales
- Family: Myrtaceae
- Genus: Eucalyptus
- Species: E. imitans

Binomial name
- Eucalyptus imitans L.A.S.Johnson & K.D.Hill

Species of eucalyptus

Eucalyptus imitans, commonly known as the Illawarra stringybark, is a species of small tree that is endemic to New South Wales. It has rough, stringy, greyish bark on the trunk and larger branches, lance-shaped, elliptic to egg-shaped or curved adult leaves, flower buds in groups of between nine and fifteen, white flowers and hemispherical fruit. It is found on near-coastal tablelands inland from the south coast.

== Description ==
Eucalyptus imitans is a tree that typically grows to a height of 10 m (33 ft) and forms a lignotuber. It has rough, stringy, greyish bark on the trunk and on branches thicker than 50 mm (2.0 in). Young plants and coppice regrowth have egg-shaped to elliptical, glossy green leaves 25–110 mm (0.98–4.33 in) long and 12–55 mm (0.47–2.17 in) wide. Adult leaves are lance-shaped, elliptic to egg-shaped or curved, 50–130 mm (2.0–5.1 in) long and 15–35 mm (0.59–1.38 in) wide on a petiole 7–18 mm (0.28–0.71 in) long. The flower buds are arranged in leaf axils in groups of between nine and fifteen on an unbranched peduncle 5–12 mm (0.20–0.47 in) long, the individual buds sessile or on pedicels up to 3 mm (0.12 in) long. Mature buds are oval to diamond-shaped, 6–7 mm (0.24–0.28 in) long and 3–4 mm (0.12–0.16 in) wide with a conical operculum. Flowering occurs from May to June or from October to November and the flowers are white. The fruit is a woody, hemispherical to shortened spherical capsule, 4–6 mm (0.16–0.24 in) long and 7–12 mm (0.28–0.47 in) wide with the valves near rim level or slightly protruding above it.

== Taxonomy and naming ==
Eucalyptus imitans was first formally described in 1991 by Lawrie Johnson and Ken Hill from a plant found inland from Kangaroo Valley in 1989. The description was published in the journal Telopea. The name imitans is a Latin word meaning "imitating", referring to the resemblance of this species to E. oblonga.

== Distribution and habitat ==
The Illawarra stringybark grows in woodland on sandstone on the plateau inland between Tallong and Nerriga.

== See also ==
- List of Eucalyptus species
