= Carrick railway station =

Former railway station in New South Wales, Australia

Carrick
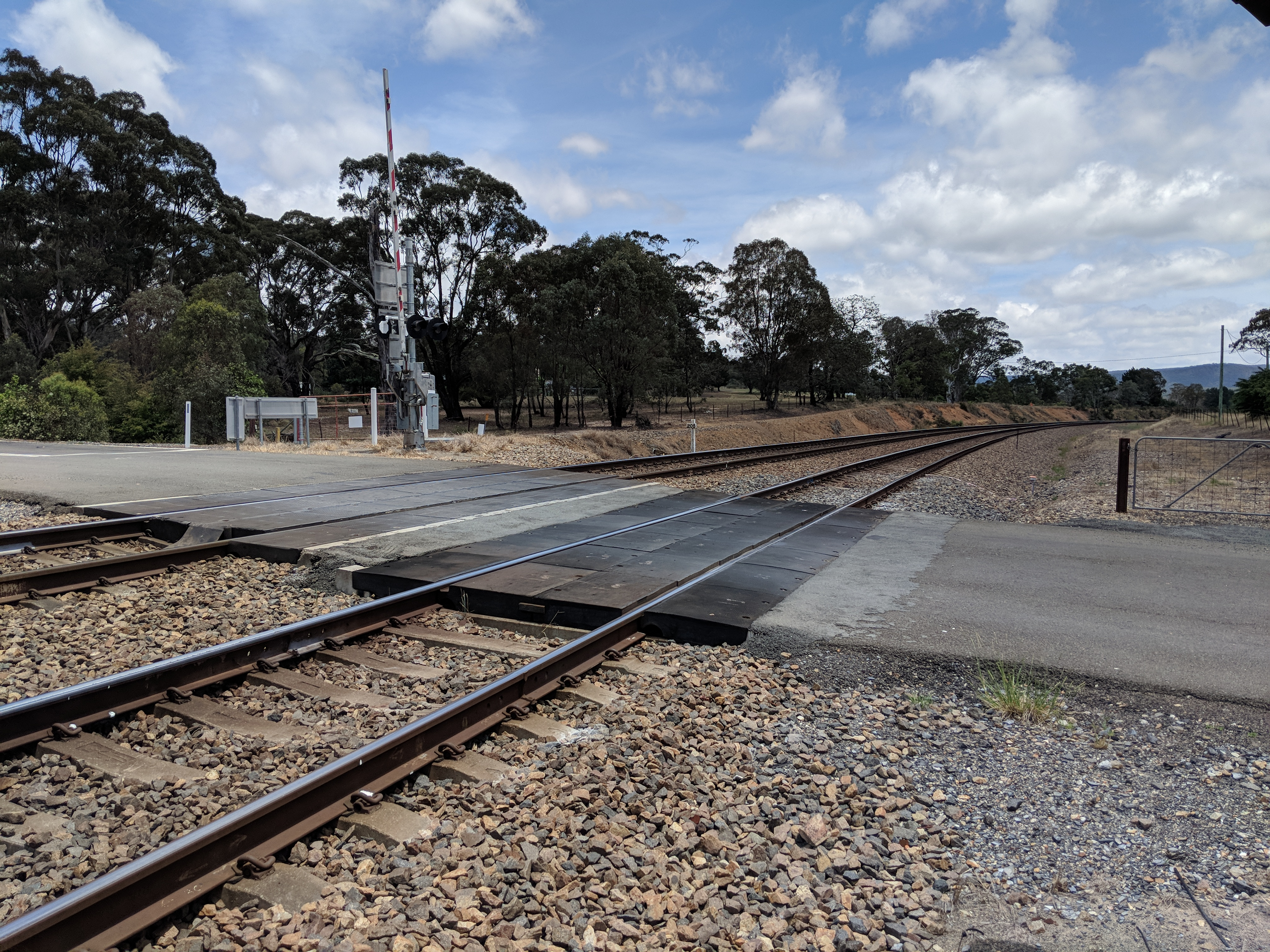
- The level crossing adjacent to the site of the former station.

General information
- Location: Carrick, New South Wales; Australia
- Coordinates: 34°41′36″S 149°52′51″E
- Operator: Public Transport Commission
- Line: Main South line
- Distance: 205.020 km from Central
- Platforms: 2
- Tracks: 2

Construction
- Structure type: Ground

History
- Opened: 9 May 1869
- Closed: 22 March 1975
- Former names: Towrang (1869-1879)

Services
Preceding station	Former services	Following station
Towrang towards Albury	Main Southern Line	Marulan towards Sydney
Location

Carrick railway station was a railway station on the Main South railway line in New South Wales, Australia. It opened in 1869 initially as Towrang, but was renamed Carrick in 1879, after sharing names with neighbouring station Towrang for nine years. Carrick closed to passenger services in 1975. It was later completely demolished and no trace of the station now survives.
