= Parish of Towrang =

Coordinates: 34°47′S 149°47′E

Towrang Parish New South Wales
- LGA(s): Goulburn Mulwaree
- County: Argyle
- Division: Eastern
Lands administrative divisions around Towrang Parish:
Narrangarril	Narrangarril	Norrong
Goulburn	Towrang Parish	Nattery
Goulburn	Gundary	Jerrara

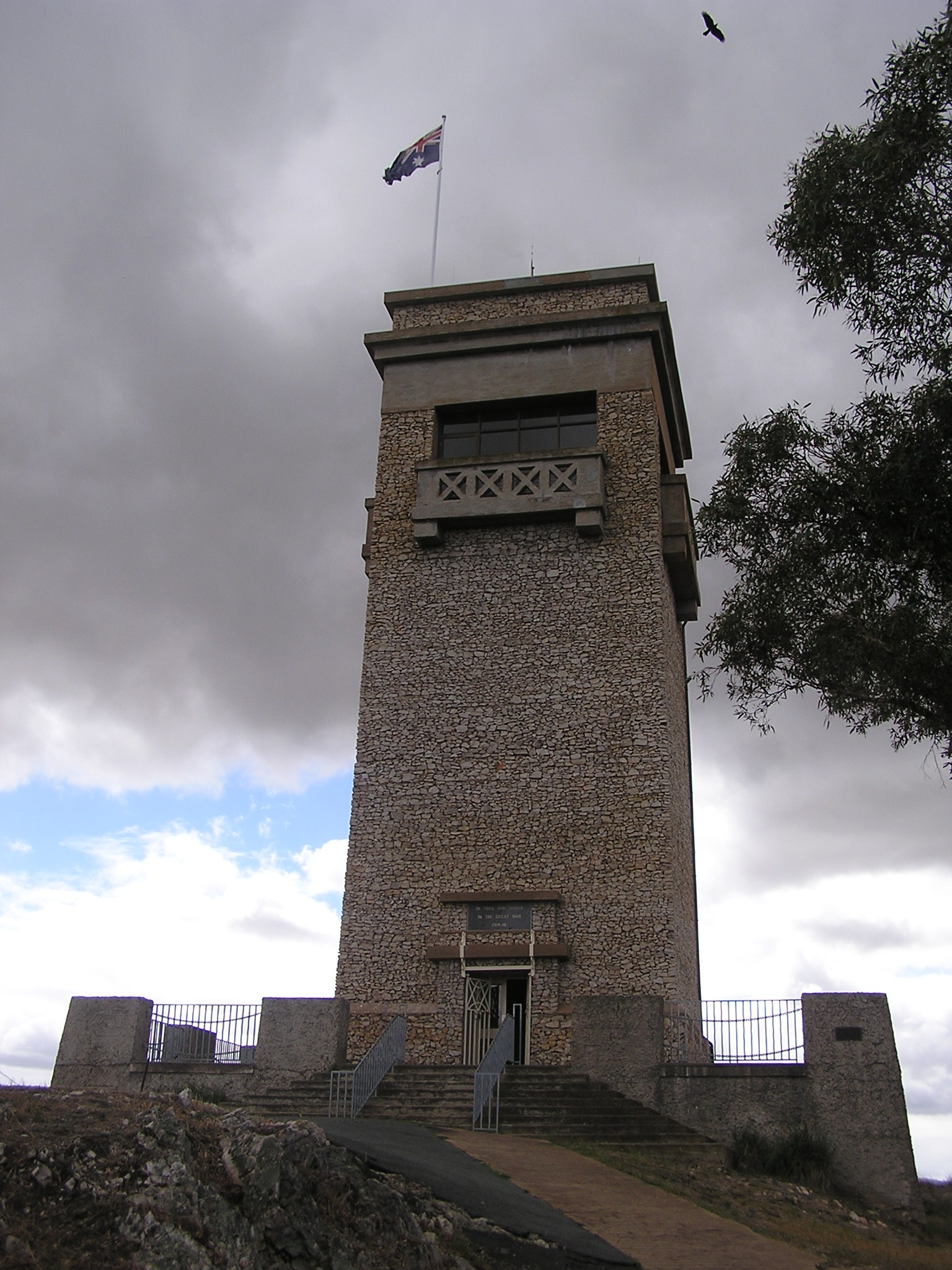
The Goulburn War Memorial is located in this parish

The Parish of Towrang is a parish of Argyle County located to the south-east of Goulburn, and including some of its outer suburbs such as Goulburn North, and the area to the east of the Wollondilly River and Mulwaree Ponds. The Goulburn War Memorial is also located in this parish. The village of Towrang is located at the north-eastern edge of the parish, with Towrang creek part of the boundary in this area.

The Wollondilly River is the boundary of the parish to the north-west. The Southern Highlands railway line runs through the northern end of the parish, just to the south of the Wollondilly River. The Hume Highway also passes through the parish. Other major roads in the area include Rosemonte road, Boxers Creek Road and Shaws Creek Road. It includes the localities of Gundary, Boxers Creek and Murrays Flats.

Sergeant Jonas Bradley (1769–1841) had received large land grants in the Parish of Towrang and was the first grower of tobacco in the colony. This land passed to William Bradley on his death in October 1841.
