= Parish of Marulan =

Coordinates: 34°45′S 149°59′E

Marulan Parish New South Wales
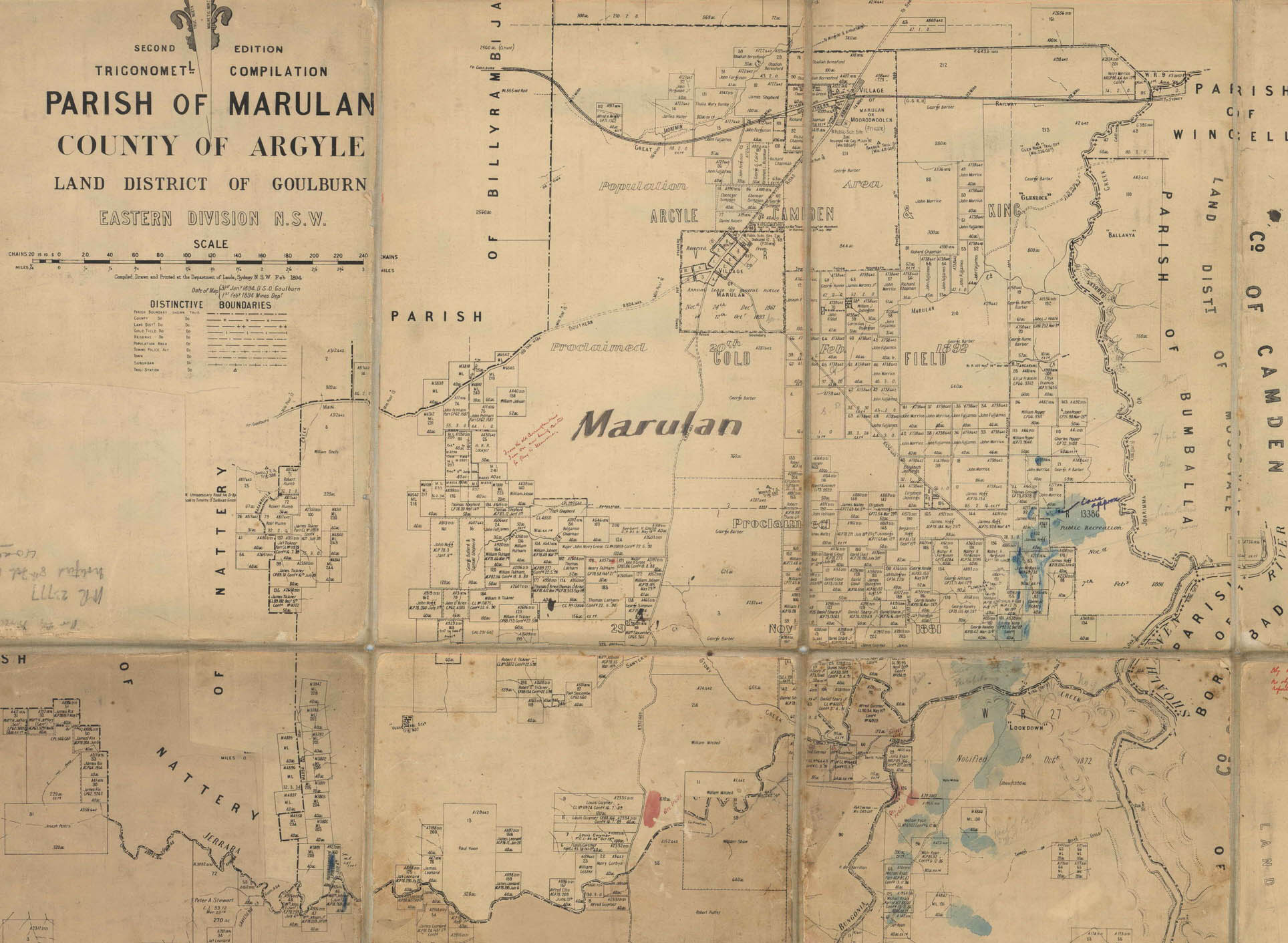
- 1894 map of the parish
- LGA(s): Goulburn Mulwaree
- County: Argyle
- Division: Eastern
Lands administrative divisions around Marulan Parish:
Billyrambija	Uringalla	Wingello (Camden)
Nattery	Marulan Parish	Bumballa (Camden)
Jerrara	Inverary	Borimbadal (Camden)

The Parish of Marulan is a parish of Argyle County located with the Goulburn Mulwaree local government area, which includes the towns of Marulan and Marulan South. The parish is bounded by Barbers Creek to the east, a small part of the Shoalhaven River to the south-east, and Jerrara Creek to the south. The Hume Highway and the Southern Highlands railway line run through the parish. Jerrara Road and Marulan South Road are other main roads in the area.
