= Towrang Convict Stockade =

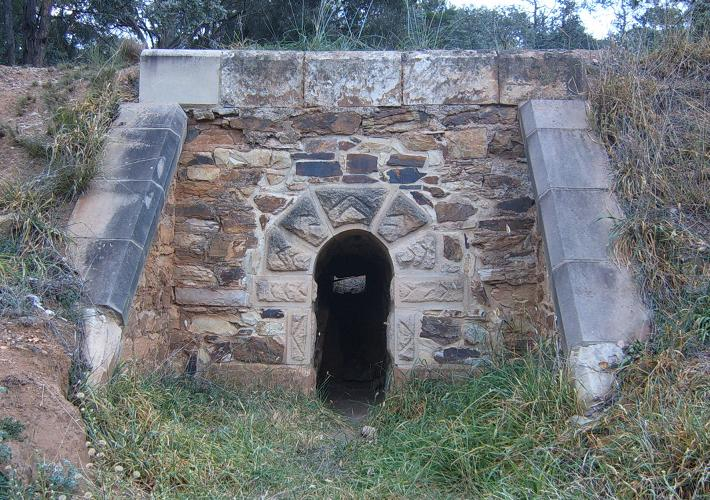
- Culvert at the site

- Location within New South Wales Location within Australia
- 34.7323°S 149.8283°E
- Location: Old Hume Highway, Towrang, Goulburn Mulwaree Council, New South Wales, Australia

History
- Built: 1838–1843

Site notes
- Architect: Possible association with David Lennox
- Owner: Roads and Traffic Authority, NSW; TOWRANG STOCKADE TRUST

New South Wales Heritage Register
- Official name: Towrang Convict Stockade, Associated Sites and Road Formations; Towrang Stockade; Great South Road; Towrang Convict Stockade; Tourang; Towrang stockade reserve; Bridge; Culverts; Powder Magazines and Graves
- Type: state heritage (archaeological-terrestrial)
- Designated: 1 February 2013
- Reference no.: 1905
- Type: Convict labour depot
- Category: Law Enforcement
- Builders: Convict Gang

Towrang Convict Stockade is a heritage-listed former convict stockade on the Old Hume Highway at Towrang, Goulburn Mulwaree Council, New South Wales, Australia. It was built from 1838 to 1843 by convict gangs. It was added to the New South Wales State Heritage Register on 1 February 2013.

== History ==
The Towrang Stockade, bridge, culverts, powder magazine and grave sites are located close to the Wollondilly River and approximately 9.6 kilometres north of Goulburn on the Hume Highway near the Towrang turn-off. It was one of several stockades that were located along the Great South Road approximately 10–11 miles (16–17 km) apart, including Wingello Stockade just east of Marulan. The distance between the stockades, as well as their distance from towns are believed to have allowed the men to easily march to the work site and back 5 miles (8 km) a day, taking about an hour each way.

Prior to European settlement the Goulburn Plains and the Wollondilly River provided native game and fish for a number of the traditional Aboriginal peoples, including the Mulwaree, Tarlo, Burra Burra, Wollondilly, Wiradjuri, Gundungurra, Dharruk, Tharawal, Lachlan, Pajong, Parramarragoo, Cookmal and Gnunawal. The Goulburn region was known as a meeting place rather than being inhabited by just one group of people. Evidence remains of sites where stone tools were made and great corroborees were held until the 19th century. Some known significant sites in the region include areas around the Wollondilly River and Mulwaree Flats.

The Goulburn Plains area was first sighted by Europeans in 1798. In 1818 Hamilton Hume, James Meehan and an exploratory party traversed and named the plains. In 1819 Governor Macquarie ordered the construction of the Great South Road (the basis for the Hume Highway) from Picton to the Goulburn Plains. The route first followed the track blazed by Meehan in 1818, and ran generally to the east of the present Hume Highway alignment and via Bungonia. Hume and Hovell's 1824 expedition and the growth of Goulburn saw the road diverted to the west. From that time most traffic travelled across Boxers Creek near the present bridge site and through Goulburn to reach southern NSW and Victoria. Settlers soon followed. The site for the town of Goulburn was gazetted in 1833.

Governor Darling held the office of Governor of the colony from December 1825 until October 1831. He not only improved the civil administration of the colony, but also encouraged exploration and expansion by instigating a road building program for roads that led to the north, south and west of Sydney. Darling's emphasis on roads had already been seen during his short acting Governorship of Mauritius where he initiated a program to improve roads. This program promoted a rise in the use of wheeled vehicles with a lessening of the demand for "slaves" to manually carry goods and palanquins. It also promoted economic development.

Darling had instructions to assign all convicts capable of reform to settlers and to send the remaining convicts to the penal settlements. The latter proved impossible. Instead he increased the severity of the conditions in the penal settlement and employed hundreds of convicts in chain gangs on road works and other public works. These acts reflected the Bigge Reports of 1822 and 1823 which recommended a great emphasis on punishment in the colony.

The road gangs soon became viewed as the place for those convicts who were least capable of reform or improvement. They were usually formed by 30 to 60 men with two convict overseers. Some of the gangs worked in irons. Removal from irons was a reward for good behaviour.

Darling's roads were designed to form a network radiating from Sydney and were modelled on the great roads of England which radiated from London. The Great South Road was the second of Darling's three roads, running from the Cross Roads south of Liverpool to Goulburn. It commenced with a survey in 1829. The Great North Road to the Hunter Valley commenced in 1826, and the Great Western Road from Emu Plains to Bathurst in 1830.

Surveyor General Thomas Mitchell resurveyed the road to Goulburn in detail in the early 1830s, and his suggested line between Lupton's Inn and Goulburn was adopted. Construction of the Great South Road, like the other roads, was slowed down by the constant resurveying of the route as better alignments were identified. This reflected the limited early knowledge and exploration of the route. The Great South Road would not reach Yass until the 1850s.

The Great South Road reached Yass in 1850 and then continued as a track through Gundagai, following the south bank of the Murrumbidgee River, through Lower Tarcutta, Holbrook and via Bowna to Albury. By 1858 it was still described as "a scarcely formed bullock track with its tottering bridges, rugged steeps and treacherous passes" but it was nevertheless a popular road for coaches.

=== The Stockade ===
By the time the Towrang Stockade was established, the stockade system had been operating for nearly half a century in the colony and was used for housing work gangs in settled areas and along major roads. A system of direct surveillance was used to discourage escape until the 1820s when the sites were generally surrounded by high timber paling fences. This became known as stockading. Stockading was officially abandoned in 1837 and the system returned to direct surveillance by troops, although paling walls were known to exist beyond 1837. The road gang was sometimes known as the Marulan Gang after the town being established between the Wingello and Towrang stockades.

The Towrang Stockade became the chief penal camp in the southern district of the newly founded colony of NSW from about 1838 to 1843 and was noted for its harsh discipline. In 1838 it was reported that Towrang housed seventy men in irons working on the road and twenty one not in irons. Other sources state that the stockade held 250 convicts for most of its history. It is certainly believed to have had the largest concentration of convicts in southern NSW during the period of its operation. The convicts were guarded by soldiers of various British regiments, including the 28th, 31st, 51st and 80th. The first commander of the stockade was Captain J. Darley (1833 to 1836), followed by Lieutenant R. Waddy (1836–39), Lieutenant R. Sherberras (1839), Captain W. Houghton Tyssen (1841), Lieutenant W. Cookson (1842) and in 1843, the last year of the stockade's operation, Lieutenant Owen Gorman. The stockade is believed to have consisted of a small cottage and a number of huts for the soldiers and their families, together with a garden tended by the military, and huts and boxes or timber cells about 4m square for the convicts further down the Wollondilly River. The huts are believed to have been of wooden and rubble construction. A plan by Surveyor Larmer shows the stockade laid out in a hollow square on the ridge running down to the powder magazine. An additional row of huts were located closer to the river and where a row of rubble heaps were still extant in 1907 while another was located on the upper side of the main quadrangle.

The stockade is said to have housed men of both short and long sentences. Men with short sentences were assigned to work such as looking after officer's horses and quarters, driving the bullock teams and felling trees. Men with longer sentences were placed on the iron gang responsible for packing and rolling sections of road, building the culverts and other heavy labour. It is contended that the Harrow Inn opened in 1840 to serve the Stockade, but no other hotel opened at Towrang until 1855, therefore it was probably to serve the traveller rather than any burgeoning village community.

The stockade was closed in 1843, and in 1845 Surveyor Larmer drew up a plan for subdivision and sale of 13 allotments in the area where the stockade was located. Evidence of the stockade was located in Lots 4, 10, 11 and 12 of the subdivision. A stockade is clearly marked in Lot 10. Although Larmer made no mention of the powder magazine or the cemetery, he did note ten buildings and four portable lock ups. Later archaeological inquiry revealed a number of these buildings believed to be convict huts without fireplaces and of pise construction. Physical occupation of the stockade area following subdivision was limited with few known accounts of activity there.

Powder Magazine

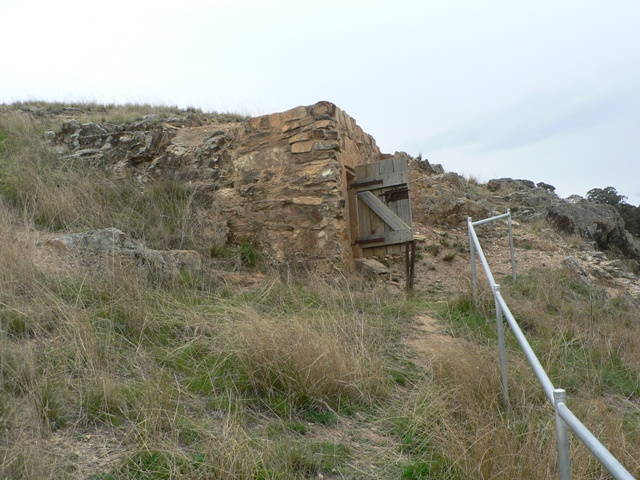
Towrang Powder Magazine.

The powder magazine was partly excavated under the bank of the Wollondilly river, and is thought to have been used to store the blasting powder used on the road cuttings and for splitting building stone. The upper part of the entrance passage was restored in 1975 but the remainder is in original condition.

Cemetery

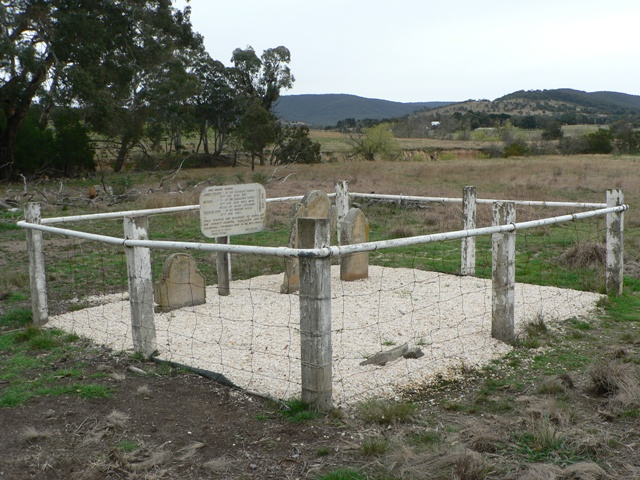
Towrang grave stones.

Only three headstones remain in the cemetery, those of Private John Moxey of the 80th Regiment (died 1838 aged 38), Elizabeth Whittacker (died 1841 aged 33) and Mary Brown (died 1841 aged 4). Charles Macalister, in his 1907 publication, claimed that both soldiers and convicts were buried there.

Bridge and Culverts

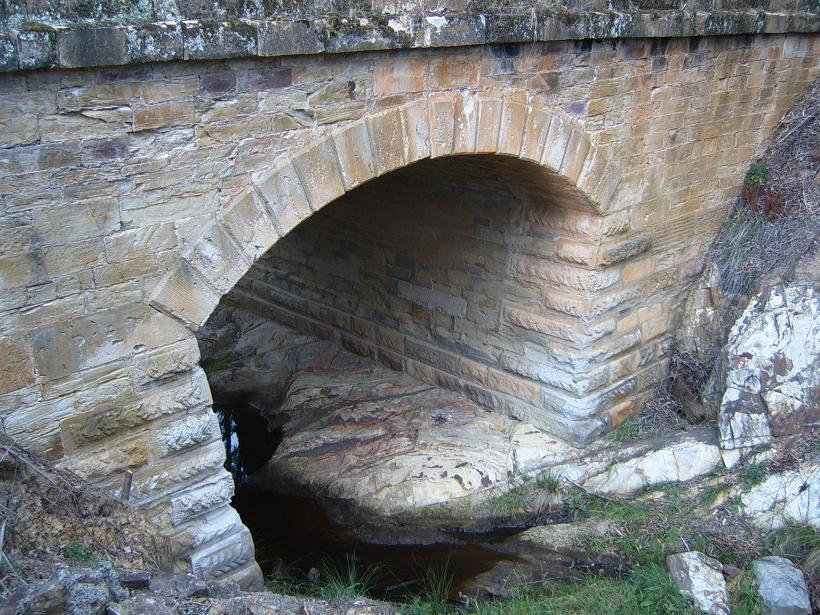
Towrang bridge of 1839.

A short distance away from the cemetery, powder magazine and associated archaeological sites are the Towrang Bridge over Towrang Creek, and the seven culverts probably constructed by convict labourers from the Towrang Stockade as part of the Great South Road. It is believed that prominent colonial bridge designer David Lennox may have designed this bridge, although this has not been proven. He is known to be responsible for Lansdowne Bridge over Prospect Creek at Liverpool and Lapstone Bridge in the Blue Mountains. The Towrang Bridge was built c. 1836-39.

Weir

A weir located between the powder magazine and the grave sites is claimed to have been one of the first stockade structures built within the stockade area. It has been suggested that it was standard practise for a garrison or military unit to construct a weir on a slow moving creek once a permanent camp was decided upon. However, the physical and documentary evidence does not support this claim at this time.

== Description ==
The stockade and sites are located on the line of the original Great South Road between Towrang Road and Carrick Road, adjacent to the current Hume Highway and about 5 km south-west of Towrang. The complex comprises a bridge and seven culverts up to 1.5 km to its west; a stockade and powder magazine on the northern side of the Hume Highway about 4.5 km south-west of Towrang and east of the Highway's intersection with Greenwich Park Road. The bridge and six culverts are located on the southern side of the Hume Highway and are accessed via the highway rest area and its access road. The road, bollards, rest area, scrub and fencing all contribute to a sense of disjointedness of these items as a group, although some parts of the road can still be followed. This, together with signage, aids greater understanding of the site. Access onto the bridge is not possible due to fencing of dangerous areas beyond. he bridge is best viewed from a small lookout beside the bridge or further up or downstream. Only two of the culverts are easily accessible.

One culvert, the stockade site, powder magazine and graves are located on the northern side of the highway near to the Wollondilly River. These are spread over a large distance, interspersed with what appear to be footings and foundations of other buildings and/or facilities. The site is signposted and access is easy, via entry from the Highway boundary fence and bridge over Towrang Creek. Further south are the remains of the Harrow Inn. The graves are separated from the rest of the site by Towrang Creek.

A conservation program for culverts two and three took place in 1987. Further restoration work to the bridge, culverts and powder magazine occurred from 1989.

Bridge

The bridge is located over Towrang Creek and is constructed of dressed, coursed sandstone segmental arch. The date "1839" was formerly visible on the keystone which has since been vandalised.

Culverts

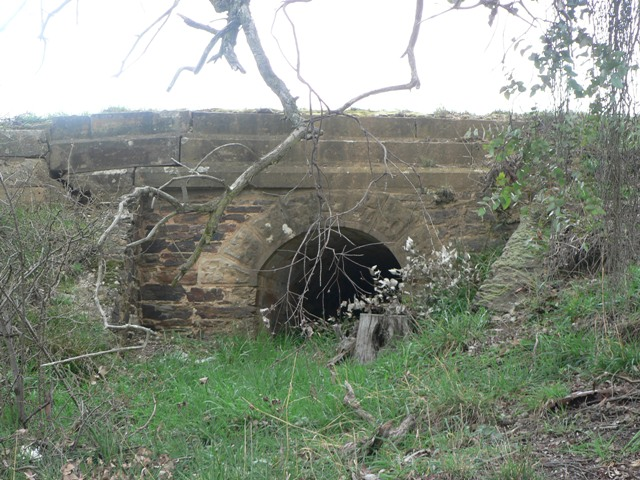
Culvert on same side of Hume Highway as the powder magazine and grave sites.

The culverts are located west of the bridge and are predominately shale with wing walls and dressed sandstone voussoirs and quoins. Culvert 1 has been refurbished with new blocks utilised in the low roadside wall above and in the projecting wing walls.

Powder Magazine and Huts

The magazine is partly excavated into the hillside above the Wollondilly River. It features sandstone and shale stonework and a vaulted passageway. Originally it had an arch over the entrance which has now been replaced by a lintel. Some of the hearths and other rubble of the huts have been located and investigated through archaeological investigation. Archaeological work has also unearthed items including uniform buttons, pins, broken crockery, and hand forged tools, and the drainage lines of some of the huts have also been located.

Monuments

The graves are located on a river flat in otherwise undulating rural countryside. They are just east of Towrang Creek and south of the junction of Towrang Creek with Wollondilly River. There are three headstones remaining which have been enclosed by a fence of wire, pipe and white painted concrete posts. The monuments, all stelae, face east and are constructed of a fine grained clay-rich sandstone somewhat delaminated and similar to "Marulan Stone". However, the stone may also be from Stonequarry Creek at Picton. Other than vandalism, the grave stones are threatened by further erosion of the clay-balls on their rear surfaces.

The individual stones are described as follows:

Gothic sandstone stele with shoulders: "Sacred to the memory of Mary Brown who departed this Life the 25th Day of June AD 1841"

Semicircular sandstone stele with cutaway shoulders: The bottom half of the stone is missing and a crack running the full breadth of the stone has been mended. The inscription reads "Sacred to the memory of Elizabeth Whiticker who departed this life June 9, 1841. Aged 33 years".

Semicircular sandstone stele with humped shoulders: A white painted metal sign within the grave site has a black inscription which reads: Sacred to the Memory of John Moxey Private soldier with 20th Regt. who departed this life November the 13th 1838 Aged 38 years. 22 years service. Remember me as you pass by. As you are now son once was I. As I am now so you must be. Prepair (sic) for death to follow me. This stone was erected by his comrades as a token of respect towards a good deserving soldier".

=== Condition ===
As at 2 June 2010, the site was generally in fair to good condition, although several factors have impacted upon the site including:

1. Laying of telecommunication cables through the sites.
2. Damage to grave markers, including vandalism.
3. Erosion of archaeological remains,
4. Exposed artefact scatters at Towrang. Where artefacts are exposed, loss of evidence may occur

The sites have a high degree of integrity.

== Heritage listing ==
The Towrang Stockade, associated sites and road formations has outstanding significance as a rare, partially intact convict stockade and road side site unaffected by significant development. It reflects the culmination of Governor Darling's systematic identification of roadwork as a form of secondary punishment. Constructed as part of Thomas Mitchell's Great South Road project, the stockade is believed to have held the largest concentration of convicts in southern NSW during its operation and provides insight into the nature of convict life and labour and early road building in NSW.

Towrang Convict Stockade was listed on the New South Wales State Heritage Register on 1 February 2013 having satisfied the following criteria.

The place is important in demonstrating the course, or pattern, of cultural or natural history in New South Wales.

The Towrang stockade, associated sites and road formations have state historical significance for their links to Governor Darling's "Great Roads" plan, which reflected his program of expansion and exploration in the colony. The program also reflected Darling's understanding of the links between a good road system and economic development. The sites also have local and State significance for their part in the development of the area between Marulen and Goulburn and improved communication between Sydney and the southern settlements.

The Towrang Stockade also has state historical significance as a physical remnant of stockades constructed in response to the use of chain gangs. The apparent harshness of life at the stockade and numbers of convicts based there reflected implementation of the British Government requirements for harsher punishment in the colony to reinforce the threat of transport as punishment in Britain, and Darling's use of chain gangs for convicts not suitable for placement with settlers.

The place is important in demonstrating aesthetic characteristics and/or a high degree of creative or technical achievement in New South Wales.

The bridge, culverts and road alignment have landmark qualities. They have ability to provide insight into the nature of convict life, labour and early road building methods and the bridge and culverts demonstrate a fine level of workmanship in stone.

The place has potential to yield information that will contribute to an understanding of the cultural or natural history of New South Wales.

The stockade and road formations have state significance for their ability to provide evidence of convict era technologies. They also have the potential to yield further information on the cultural values of the region.

The place possesses uncommon, rare or endangered aspects of the cultural or natural history of New South Wales.

The combination of bridge, road, culverts and the stockade area has state significance as a rare example of convict settlement and industry. The stockade is rare as a still partially intact convict stockade that has not suffered subsequent development.

The place is important in demonstrating the principal characteristics of a class of cultural or natural places/environments in New South Wales.

The culverts and bridge have state significance as excellent examples of their construction while the Stockade site is representative of a number constructed for convict road gangs during the building of the road South from Sydney.
