= Old Marulan Town =

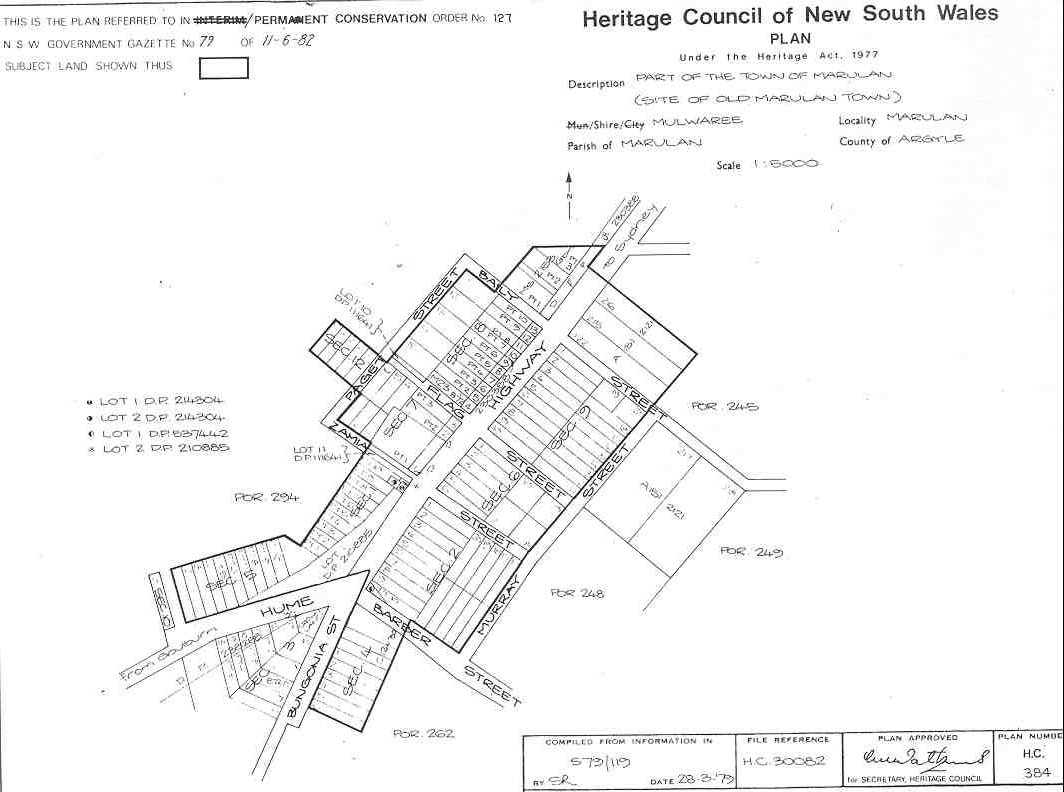
- Heritage boundaries

- Location within New South Wales Location within Australia
- 34.7296°S 149.9835°E
- Location: Marulan, New South Wales, Australia

History
- Built: 1835–1867

Site notes
- Owner: Transport for NSW; Telstra; Trustees Church of England; Trustees of the Roman Catholic Church

New South Wales Heritage Register
- Official name: Old Marulan Town; Site of old Marulan Town; Whole of Township
- Type: state heritage (archaeological-terrestrial)
- Designated: 2 April 1999
- Reference no.: 127
- Type: Townscape
- Category: Urban Area

Old Marulan Town is a heritage-listed former townscape at Marulan, New South Wales, Australia. It is the site of the original Marulan township prior to the moving of the village in the 1860s in the wake of the Main Southern railway bypassing the original town. It is also known as Mooroowoolen. It was built from 1835 to 1867. It was added to the New South Wales State Heritage Register on 2 April 1999.

== History ==
The establishment of towns outside of the County of Cumberland did not gain momentum until the 1830s. This decade became an intensive period of town founding in New South Wales. The 13 year boom receded in 1842 when economic depression temporarily halted expansion. During this period however 53 new towns and villages were planned by the colonial administration.

Many Australian towns originated because of the need for provision of services. Typically, an inn would be established on a colonial road and then other service establishments would be attracted to the location, such as a general store, blacksmith, wheelwright etc. The colonial roads contained many such hamlets providing for travellers needs.

The essential qualities of a service town are that it serves a population outside its own boundaries and produces services for sale rather than goods. Marulan began as one such service town in the early days of the boom period of the 1830s.

The colonial administration was responsible for the setting aside of land for villages and town reserves and subsequently for design and layout of these centres. The decision as to their location was based upon constraints relating to the nature of the settlement. Thus the site for a service town would be determined largely by transport routes. Since river and road transport antedated selection of town sites in most cases, they exerted a controlling influence on site location.

A town of the 1830s was often no more than a small cluster of buildings and this remained the situation even during the land boom of the 1830s. Apart from the wayside public house, the smallest settlements were hamlets, recognised by the possession of a general store and a blacksmith or shoemaker. In the south, Gunning, Bungendore and Marulan, which depended on road traffic represented this type of town.

The town plans drawn up by the Surveyor General's office reflected the size and type of the individual town. In contrast to the major regional centres, ordinary towns and villages were not given detailed layout plans and the smaller villages such as Marulan, designed to provide services to travellers, were characterised by linear plans following a largely single street pattern.

By reserving an area for a village prior to the growth of that district a certain primacy was afforded to that location. Any businessmen who considered locating outside the government reserve would have faced considerable disadvantages.

The advantages of the village sites were that within the reserved area:

1. It was possible to purchase a small parcel of land;
2. post offices and government buildings were available;
3. mailcoaches stopped;
4. The government was required to provide services and improved conditions.

The disadvantages of other locations stifled development away from the reserve.

Within the Marulan district only one location possessed the features to satisfy the requirement of a village reserve and that was where the village began.

=== Site selection ===
The Great South Road, south of the Cumberland Plain, was first marked out by Surveyor-General Mitchell in 1829–30. It ran parallel to the coast and passed through the village of Bungonia. A branch road was also marked out to leave the main line at the beginning of the Marulan Range. This road was to lead to the Goulburn Plains and township.

Mitchell then returned to select suitable sites for the founding of towns and villages. At the junction of the roads from Bungonia and Goulburn he selected a place to serve the travellers on these new roads. The name given to the site was Marulan. He saw the function of the village as that of a wayside settlement and so chose the site where traffic would be greatest. He also noted the importance of a supply of fresh water and as Barber's Creek was nearby this constraint could be satisfied.

Mitchell instructed a surveyor to lay out some allotments to allow occupation in 1834, although the design of the complete village had not yet been approved. Apparently requests had been made for the early subdivision of sites.

=== The development of the village ===
Marulan was given a simple design with no side streets and with all allotments having frontages to the major roads. The design is unusual in that it does not conform to the 1829 Government regulations for the laying out of towns and villages, presumably because there was no intention for Marulan to become a town.

Due to the road junctions, reservations were provided on three corners of the intersection, with the largest reservation on the high side of the junction being the Church reserve, maintaining the tradition of allocating the most prominent position in a settlement to the church. All other allotments were equally placed around the road junction. Approval of the design was notified in March 1835

One of the first buildings in the village area was the Woolpack Inn, built by Joseph Peters in 1835. Confusion and concern about the future of the village plan in 1835 had prompted Peters to write to the Surveyor General referring to the fact that he had "nearly" completed a large brick house and stable for the accommodation of the public, and would be unjustly injured if the road was realigned further. Fortunately for Peters the line of the road was not altered.

Subsequently, Peters applied to be the Marulan postmaster and was appointed so in 1836. Also at this time a blacksmiths shop was established, and together with the inn and post office, supplied the basic needs of the travellers.

In 1841 the Church Reserve was surveyed with three allotments being created for a church, a dwelling and a school. On a visit in 1847 Bishop William Broughton inspected the "commodious chapel in which the divine service is periodically performed".

During the late 1830s and 1840s the sale of land at Marulan continued and the original design of the village was extended. The first additional allotments merely extended the village linearly along the Great South Road, but later depth was added to the village. As the need arose for house sites, side streets were included and allotments were surveyed with frontage to these minor streets. There were however probably not as many residents as appears from the number of lots in the village as often one person owned several lots and other areas were held by absentee landholders.

A decade after the founding of the settlement it was described as "a small cluster of houses with two inns, a post office and three or four stores procuring custom."

A notice of sale appeared in the Sydney Morning Herald of 18 February 1850 relating to four allotments in the centre of the village and described as the land at the corner of Barbour Street and opposite the Woolpack Inn. The notice refers to the following improvements:

1. The Australian Store, with attached four bedroom dwelling of brick construction on stone footings;
2. A schoolhouse of timber slabs;
3. A stable for five horses with loft; and
4. A court house of brick on stone foundation, lately out of use, the court having been discontinued since 1 January 1850.

All the buildings offered for sale were described as being large and of sound construction.

=== The railway ===
During the 1840s there was much discussion of the possibility of a southern railway either along the line of the Great South Road or through Goulburn.

The decision was finally made in favour of Goulburn. Nevertheless, for the route of the Main Southern railway Marulan was an important point for it stood on the ridge which separated the valleys of the Shoalhaven River and the Wollondilly River. This was the narrowest piece of land between the two rivers so that whatever route was chosen it had to pass in the vicinity of the village.

Pressure was applied on the government by many local landowners wishing to profit from the proximity of the railway to their land. It would seem that some at least had more influence than the Marulan residents for when finally drawn up in 1857 and confirmed by legislation in 1862 the line passed to the north of the village and not sufficiently near to it to ensure the village's future.

The political decision to so locate the railway completely changed the patterns and means of transport in that district. For Marulan specifically it meant that the village no longer had access to through traffic and had to move to the point where the two transport corridors crossed. If the village had refused to move it is most probable that a completely new settlement would have been founded near the railway.

=== The new town site ===
At the time of construction of the railway, the population in the neighbourhood of Marulan increased, however at the end of 1867, as work on the viaduct across Barber's Creek neared completion, many of the railway workers moved to the next section of the line.

John Morrice, the owner of the property "Glenrock", took advantage of the railways construction by subdividing the land fronting the main road in the vicinity of the railway. He named this town Mooroowoolen, and an advertisement for the sale of lots appeared in 1867. It was about 2 miles from Marulan.

Unfortunately for Morrice the railway station was not opened until August 1868, and the demand for his sites was poor. The only real interest was shown by those who operated businesses at Marulan. The Marulan Postmaster and storekeeper, John O'Neill erected new premises at Mooroowoolen and the Mooroowoolen post office operated after February 1868. The inns at the old town were closed, also relocating near the railway.

An article in the Sydney Morning Herald of 12 May 1868, described the impact of the railway:

"The railway crosses the main road at right angles to the little township of Mooroowoolen. Marulan is a curiosity in townships. At one time it was a thriving and busy place, but now the buildings are going to decay, and there seems little prospect of improvement."

Since most of the children attending the Marulan Public School had moved to Mooroowoolen it was decided to also move the school. Temporary premises were rented from June 1870 and occupation of a new school on a site donated by John Morrice commenced in December, 1871.

A new stone church was opened at Mooroowoolen on 1 October 1878 replacing the chapel at the old town site. The moving of the church represented the final stage of the relocation of Marulan.

Gradually Mooroowoolen became known as Marulan. The old township was in a state of ruin and the new town contained all the relevant services to cater for the needs of travellers. The function of the settlement had not changed and the layout of the new township was similar to that of the original village; its form remained basically linear still focussing on the main road.

== Description ==
A village plan still exists. The Hume Highway (formerly the Great South Road), Bungonia Street and Barber Street remain in present use, and a number of other streets are still identifiable. Barber Street currently provides access to trucks carrying material from mines in Bungonia Gorge although the road alignment has been altered at the intersection of the highway.

This plan is the final plan of the village layout dated and a series of earlier plans of the growing town have been located dated 1835, 1839, 1841. A detailed description of archaeological features and relics is located in the field survey.

=== (i) Eastern Section ===
Remains of the town buildings and associated structures are concentrated on the eastern side of the highway. The approximate position of the N/S property boundaries along the highway is indicated by a fence line with heavy vertical timber posts.

Field survey has identified the position of a substantial number of surface features in these areas associated with the original township.

These include:

(a) foundations of a line of stone, brick and slab buildings which once stood along the highway
(b) evidence of domestic planting
(c) remains of fences, walls and hedges along property boundaries
(d) depressions representing the alignment of streets
(e) refuse piles containing domestic debris
(f) one substantial (possible) communal well
(g) evidence of a blacksmith's forge
(h) an industrial area containing evidence of brick and lime manufacture for the production of building materials
(i) concentrations of brick, worked stone and artefact scatters indicating previous human occupation of the land
(j) various other features such as rectangular depressions and large bramble brushes which are characteristic of disturbed land resulting from human occupation
(k) two cemeteries containing burials from the period of settlement to the present time

=== (ii) Western Section ===
While the greatest number of sites have been identified on the eastern side of the highway, evidence of the previous occupation is apparent on the western side of the highway.

Sites include:

(i) a concentration of ceramic and glass fragments and a small number of broken bricks was found on the grass verge on the DMR reserve; though disturbed, it would appear that the material relates to the site of the Woolpack Inn known to have stood on this land.
(ii) mature introduced vegetation in Section 7, indicative of early garden planting
(iii) a large bramble bush (section 5) possibly represents an early building site

Field survey did not locate relics in Section 5 or "Appendix B".

=== Archaeological evidence ===
The concentration of surface finds in some areas indicates the location of subsurface, stratified archaeological deposits; however, no systematic archaeological excavation has been undertaken within the curtilage. The deposits of archaeological significance indicating the nature of occupation and settlement of Old Marulan Town are distributed throughout the site.

Surface evidence predominates in some sections of the site and it can be predicted that the whole site contains covered relics which are not visible without excavation.

== Heritage listing ==
The site of Old Marulan Town is considered to be an outstanding archaeological resource which is able to vividly illustrate unrecorded details of Australian history relating to the form and functions of an early colonial service town, and the way of life of its inhabitants. Examination of the ground surface indicates that the total area of the site contains relics relating to the early occupation of the town. Future archaeological research of the site should result in a wealth of information which is only suggested from surface findings. The significance of the relics and deposits within the land is heightened by the limited period of the town's existence and the subsequent lack of further development of the land. The site therefore is a rare "time capsule" relating to colonial town life from 1835 to 1867 which has suffered minimal contamination from later phases of use. Exploitation of the site in order to gather historic information would necessitate the preparation of a full research study prior to archaeological excavation of any part of the site in order that all possible avenues of research be considered.

Old Marulan Town was listed on the New South Wales State Heritage Register on 2 April 1999 having satisfied the following criteria.

The place is important in demonstrating aesthetic characteristics and/or a high degree of creative or technical achievement in New South Wales.

The town site is a valuable historical and archaeological site rich in information relative to the formand function of an early colonial country town and the way of life of its inhabitants. It was established in the earliest expansions of town and village settlement beyond the Cumberland Plain.

The place possesses uncommon, rare or endangered aspects of the cultural or natural history of New South Wales.

Old Marulan's significance is two-fold. First, the number of towns dating from this early period which were not developed after the 1860s is very small. Those known to exist include Carrington, Boydtown and towns associated with mining activities.

Second, although roughly of the same period, Old Marulan is unlike these other town sites. The mining "towns" were mainly canvas settlements built for a transient and itinerant population and generally contained few buildings of even a semipermanent nature. Examples of this type of township include Hill End, Byng and Silvertown from the 1850s and 60's and Newnes and Glen Davis and Joadja from the turn of the century.
