= Pultenaea elusa =

Elusive bush-pea

Conservation status
- Endangered (EPBC Act)

Scientific classification
- Kingdom: Plantae
- Clade: Tracheophytes
- Clade: Angiosperms
- Clade: Eudicots
- Clade: Rosids
- Order: Fabales
- Family: Fabaceae
- Subfamily: Faboideae
- Genus: Pultenaea
- Species: P. elusa

Binomial name
- Pultenaea elusa (J.D.Briggs & Crisp) de Kok

Species of flowering plant

Pultenaea elusa, commonly known as elusive bush-pea, is a species of flowering plant in the family Fabaceae and is endemic to a small area of New South Wales. It is a low shrub with sharply-pointed linear leaves, and dense clusters of yellow to orange and red to purple flowers. It has not been seen since 1938.

== Description ==
Pultenaea elusa is a low, straggling shrub with branches up to 50 cm (20 in) long and hairy branchlets. The leaves are arranged alternately, linear with a sharply-pointed tip, 5–16 mm (0.20–0.63 in) long and 0.6–2.0 mm (0.024–0.079 in) wide. The upper surface of the leaves is glabrous, while the lower surface is hairy, and there are stipules 5–9 mm (0.20–0.35 in) long at the base. The flowers are arranged in dense clusters with a few bracts at the base, each flower on a pedicel 1.0–1.2 mm (0.039–0.047 in) long.The sepals are 4–4.5 mm (0.16–0.18 in) long, with linear to boat-shaped bracteoles 3.0–3.5 mm (0.12–0.14 in) long attached at the base. The standard petal is yellow to orange, 5.5–7 mm (0.22–0.28 in) long, the wings 5–6 mm (0.20–0.24 in) long, and the keel is red to purple and 5.0–5.5 mm (0.20–0.22 in) long. Flowering occurs from September to November, and the fruit is a pod 4.0–4.5 mm (0.16–0.18 in) long.

== Taxonomy and naming ==
Elusive bush-pea was first formally described in 1994 by John D. Briggs and Michael Crisp, who gave it the name Pultenaea parrisiae subsp. elusa in the journal Telopea, based on specimens collected in 1938 by William Blakely from swamps near Wingello. In 2004, Rogier Petrus Johannes de Kok elevated the subspecies to species status, reclassifying it as Pultenaea elusa. The specific epithet (elusa) is from a Latin word (eludo) meaning 'to avoid, evade or frustrate', referring to the difficulty in relocating populations of this species.

== Distribution and habitat ==
This pultenaea grows in swamps at an altitude of about 600 m (2,000 ft), but is only known from the two collections made by William Blakely in 1938.

== Conservation status ==
Pultenaea elusa is classified as "endangered" under the Australian Government Environment Protection and Biodiversity Conservation Act 1999 and as "critically endangered" under the New South Wales Government Biodiversity Conservation Act 2016.
