= Big Hill, New South Wales =

Big Hill
- Town
- Coordinates: 34°32′57″S 150°00′02″E
- Country: Australia
- State: New South Wales
- Region: Southern Tablelands
- LGA: Upper Lachlan Shire
- Location: 189 km (117 mi) SW of Sydney; 41 km (25 mi) NE of Goulburn

Government
  - State electorate: Goulburn
  - Federal division: Riverina
- Elevation: 658 m (2,159 ft)

Population
  - Total: 78 (SAL 2021)
- Postcode: 2580
- County: Argyle
- Parish: Eden Forest
Localities around Big Hill
| Myrtleville | Bannaby |
| Chatsbury | Big Hill | Canyonleigh |
| Greenwich Park | Brayton | Canyonleigh |

Big Hill is a bounded rural locality in Upper Lachlan Shire to the north of Marulan in the Southern Tablelands of New South Wales, Australia. At the 2016 census, it had a population of 44.

The area is characterised with agricultural activities, predominantly grazing, as well as National Parks. Grazing was first introduced by Hannibal Hawkins Macarthur nephew of John Macarthur, who established a 1000 acre farm, Arthursleigh, at Big Hill in 1819.

By the start of the 20th century, Big Hill boasted a Methodist chapel, school and a post office. Today, only the church remains, and Arthursleigh operates as an agriculture research and teaching centre of the University of Sydney.

Big Hill Post Office opened on 1 November 1869 and closed in 1945.

The main geographical features of Big Hill include Mount Modickmurribar from which the area is named, the Wollondilly River to the east and the Tarlo River National Park to the west.

Big Hill is roughly equivalent to the cadastral parishes of Cookbundoon and Eden Forest in the county of Argyle.
