= Tallong Public School =

School in New South Wales, Australia

Coordinates: 34°43′S 150°05′E

Information
- Established: 1865; 160 years ago
- Gender: Mixed
- Enrollment: c.40 (2004)

Tallong Public School is a co-educational government primary school located in Tallong, New South Wales, Australia. Established in 1865 in what was then Barber's Creek, it is the oldest surviving single-teacher schoolhouse in Australia. Workers on the Great Southern Railway were engaged in building a viaduct at Barber's Creek, and since the nearest government school was five miles away at Marulan, they built the schoolhouse. In July 1865, 75 persons signed a petition to the National Board of Education, requesting that the board pay the salary of a teacher whom they had already hired; the parents paid fees to the teacher but could not afford an adequate salary.

The railway ensured the survival of the village (renamed Tallong in 1906) and during the steam era and the advent of the motor era, when other small towns were folding, the school at Tallong was sometimes the only education available in the area.

As of 2004, the school averaged about 40 students per term. Specialist teachers visit the school during the week to instruct students in subjects such as music and science.

== See also ==
- List of Government schools in New South Wales
