= Paddys River (Southern Highlands, New South Wales) =

Coordinates: 34°39′S 150°10′E

Paddys Patricks River

Location
- Country: Australia
- State: New South Wales
- Region: Sydney Basin (IBRA), Southern Highlands
- Local government area: Wingecarribee

Physical characteristics
- Source confluence: Reedy Creek and Munros Gully
  - location: west of Bundanoon
- Mouth: confluence with the Wollondilly River
  - location: west of Cayonleigh
- Length: 32 km (20 mi)

Basin features
- River system: Hawkesbury-Nepean catchment

The Paddys River, a perennial river that is part of the Hawkesbury-Nepean catchment, is located in the Southern Highlands region of New South Wales, Australia.

== Course and features ==
Formed by the confluence of Reedy Creek and Munros Gully, the Paddys River rises west of Bundanoon, and flows generally west northwest, before reaching its confluence with the Wollondilly River west of the locality of Cayonleigh. The course of the river is 32 kilometres (20 mi).

The Hume Freeway crosses the river near the locality of Paddys River.

== See also ==
- List of rivers of New South Wales (L–Z)
- List of rivers of Australia
- Rivers of New South Wales
