= Towrang railway station =

Former railway station in New South Wales, Australia

Towrang

General information
- Location: Towrang, New South Wales; Australia
- Coordinates: 34°41′37″S 149°51′07″E
- Operator: Public Transport Commission
- Line: Main South line
- Distance: 208.520 km from Central
- Platforms: 2 (2 side)
- Tracks: 2

Construction
- Structure type: Ground

History
- Opened: 19 May 1869
- Closed: 9 November 1974
- Rebuilt: 1874
- Former names: Mannafields (1869-1870)

Services
| Preceding station | Former services | Following station |
|---|---|---|
| Murrays Flats towards Albury | Main Southern Line | Carrick towards Sydney |
Location

Towrang railway station was a railway station on the Main South railway line, serving the locality of Towrang, New South Wales, Australia. It originally opened as a platform on 19 May 1869, called Mannafields after a property of the same name. On 11 March 1870 the platform was renamed Towrang. The initial platform was later replaced by a new station to the north, in 1874. It was an active station with a siding to load local agricultural produce. The station closed on 9 November 1974 and was demolished in the 1980s. Little evidence remains of the station, although two sets of points were later installed at the site to allow access to either track at times of track maintenance.
