= Werai railway station =

Former railway station in New South Wales, Australia

Werai

General information
- Location: Werai, New South Wales; Australia
- Coordinates: 34°35′16″S 150°20′44″E
- Operator: Department of Railways
- Line: Main South line
- Distance: 151.300 km from Central
- Platforms: 2
- Tracks: 2

Construction
- Structure type: Ground

History
- Opened: 19 August 1883
- Closed: 5 April 1969
- Rebuilt: 1897
- Former names: Meryla (1883-1901)

Services
Preceding station	Former services	Following station
Exeter towards Albury	Main Southern Line	Moss Vale towards Sydney
Location

Werai railway station was a railway station on the Main South railway line in New South Wales, Australia. It served the small Southern Highlands town of Werai.

== History ==
First opened in the locality in 1883 as Meryla, the station was moved in 1897. Meryla was renamed Werai in 1901. Consisting of a pair of side platforms, it closed in 1969 and was demolished. Little trace now remains.
