= Tallong, New South Wales =

Tallong
- Town
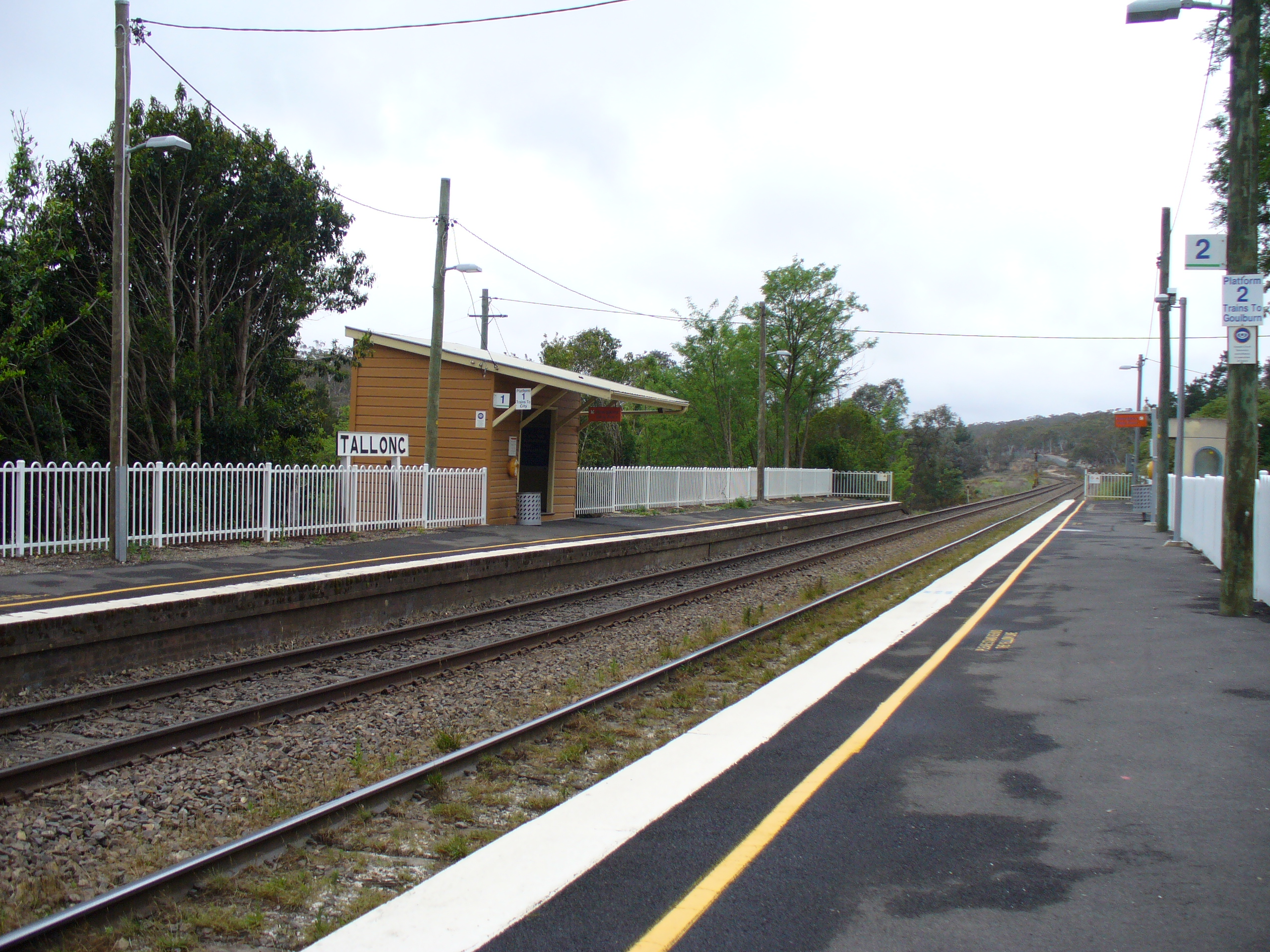
- Tallong Railway Station, which opened in 1869

- Coordinates: 34°43′0″S 150°05′0″E
- Country: Australia
- State: New South Wales
- Region: Southern Tablelands, Southern Highlands
- LGA: Goulburn-Mulwaree Council
- Location: 8 km (5.0 mi) E of Marulan; 32 km (20 mi) E of Goulburn; 46 km (29 mi) SW of Moss Vale; 160 km (99 mi) SW of Sydney

Government
  - State electorate: Goulburn
  - Federal division: Eden-Monaro
- Elevation: 620 m (2,030 ft)

Population
  - Total: 914 (2021 census)
- Postcode: 2579
Localities around Tallong
Brayton	Paddys River	Canyonleigh
Marulan	Tallong	Wingello
Bungonia	Tolwong	Tolwong

Tallong is in the traditional lands of the Gundungurra people. It is a village east of the Great Dividing Range and is located in the Southern Highlands region of New South Wales, Australia, in Goulburn-Mulwaree Council. At the 2021 census, the village had a population of 914. The town is 8.5 km from the town of Marulan and 25 km from the town of Bundanoon.

The principal industries of the village include stud farms, arts and crafts and services for surrounding farms.

Tallong is home to the Tallong Midge Orchid (Genoplesium plumosum), a tiny flower found only in the area surrounding the town. This orchid is now a protected species. It was discovered in 1997.

== Etymology ==
The original settlement was named Barber's Creek after the watercourse that runs through the town. In the early twentieth century the town was renamed "Tallong" after an Aboriginal word meaning either "tongue" or "spring of water".

== History ==
=== Colonial era ===
The first European settler in the area was George Barber, a cattle farmer. In 1814 Barber established a cattle station along what became known as Barber's Creek. In 1821 he received a grant of 300 acres (120 ha) covering the general Tallong-Marulan district, to be converted from cedar brush to farmland. Before his death in a riding accident in 1844, Barber had extended his local landholdings to 4,000 acres (1,600 ha), which he named "Glenrock". He is buried in the Old Marulan Cemetery in Marulan.

In the late 1820s, that portion of Barber's land that would eventually become the township was sold or reallocated to Sydney entrepreneur and mariner Billy Blue. Convict labour was used to clear the grazing land and prepare a route for the Main South railway line to Goulburn. Tallong was selected as the location for a railway refuelling point, and the town's initial population consisted of convicts, woodcutters, railway workers and their families.

The opening of the railway in 1869 brought shops, a school, hotels and a post office to the town.

=== Post-Federation ===
By 1900, cattle grazing was slowly giving way to a thriving fruit industry, known particularly for apples and pears. The village sent an annual exhibit of a tall pyramid of fruit to the Sydney Royal Easter Show; Tallong's apples and pears took top honours several times throughout the early part of the twentieth century.

The population reached 200 in 1920, and a Memorial Hall was constructed to mark the town's growth and record the service of local residents in World War I. The Hall and war memorial are still standing today.

In 1955 the Australian poet and novelist Seaforth Mackenzie drowned while attempting to swim across Tallong (formerly Barber's) Creek near the town.

Tallong was destroyed in the Chatsbury bushfire of 1965. Its economy did not fully recover and the award-winning fruit industry folded. Many residents moved and the post office and a number of small businesses closed.

== Heritage listings ==
Tallong has a number of heritage-listed sites, including:

- Main Southern railway: Tallong railway station

== Attractions ==
The village is also home to one of the oldest surviving single-teacher schoolhouses in Australia at Tallong Public School. Moreover, it is home to the country campus of Santa Sabina College.

Furthermore, the village is home to two lookouts on the plateau that makes up the Shoalhaven Gorge (a 1,500-foot (460 m) which looks over the drop to the Shoalhaven River) and Morton National Park. The lookouts are known as Badgerys Lookout and Longpoint Lookout.

Tallong is home to the big apple and host to the award-winning annual "Apple Day" festival although the festival was cancelled for 2024.

There is also an annual Tallong Trail Ride in support of the Rural Fire Service.

== See also ==
- Wingello Parish, Camden
- Tallong Public School
- Tallong railway station, New South Wales
