= Owen Gorman =

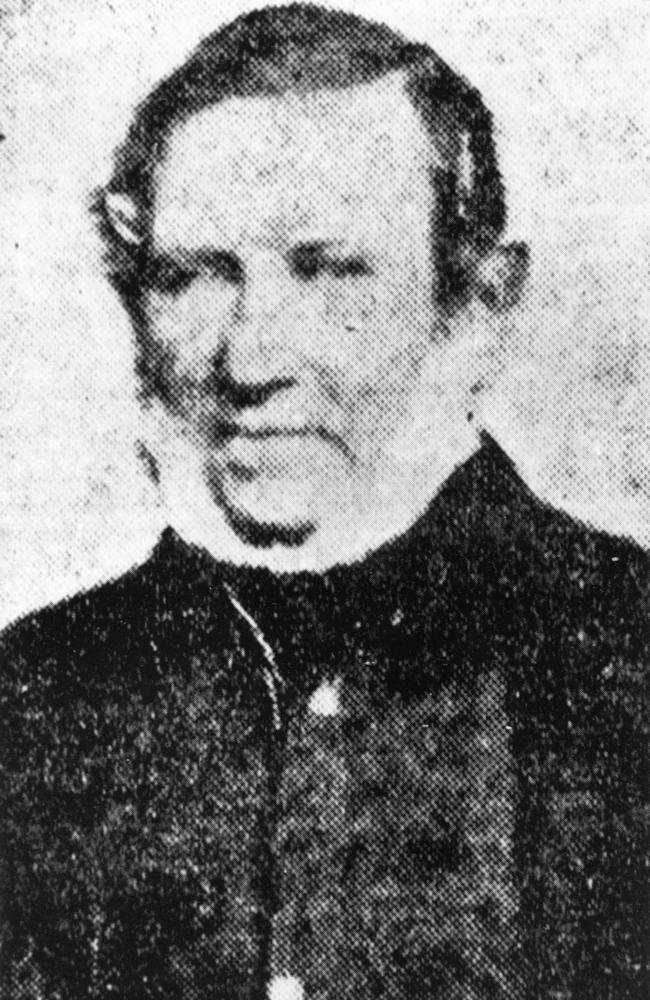
Lieutenant Owen Gorman

Owen Gorman (1799–1862) was a British Army officer and commandant of the Moreton Bay penal colony.

== Early life ==
Gorman was born on 25 July 1799 at Clogham, King's County, Ireland.

== Army career ==
Gorman enlisted in the 58th Foot Regiment as a private soldier on 25 August 1817. He rose through the ranks and become Lieutenant on 1 June 1833. Gorman served as the last commandant of the Moreton Bay penal colony from July 1839 to May 1842 and was responsible for transitioning Brisbane from a penal colony to free settlement. In 1843 after the closure of the penal colony, Gorman was appointed Superintendent of the Iron Gangs at the Towrang Convict Stockade near Goulburn in New South Wales.

== Commandant at Moreton Bay ==
In 1840, the penal colony at Moreton Bay was being prepared to be turned into a free settlement (which ultimately became the city of Brisbane). As there was settlement already occurring west of Moreton Bay on the Darling Downs, Gorman needed to find a wagon route between the two locations, but the obstacle was the mountains of the Great Dividing Range. There was a route already known at Cunninghams Gap but it was not able to be used by a wagon. A convict John Sterry Baker had escaped from the penal colony in 1826 and had lived among the Goomburra Aboriginal people in the Lockyer Valley area and walked with them on a track to the top of the range. Having returned to the penal colony in 1840, Baker told Gorman of the track up the range and modified an Irish jaunting car to test as a wagon on the route. Together Gorman and Baker ascended the range with their wagon on 17 October 1840 arriving at Eton Vale. Despite the fact that Gorman did not discover the route, it nonetheless became known as Gorman's Gap Road. The route which runs between Upper Flagstone in the west and Flagstone Creek in the east was marked by blazing a line of trees. It became the first gazetted road in Queensland. Today, the road no longer officially exists and is overgrown but can still be followed. There are three monuments along the route, one at each end and the other along the route at Camel's Hump where Gorman took his compass bearing.

== Later life ==
Gorman resigned his commission in the army in 1845. About 1855 he moved to Armidale.

Gorman died on 6 October 1862 in Armidale.
