= Greenwich Park, New South Wales =

Greenwich Park
- Town
- Coordinates: 34°34′54″S 149°56′4″E
- Country: Australia
- State: New South Wales
- Region: Southern Tablelands
- LGA: Upper Lachlan Shire
- Location: 29 km (18 mi) NE of Goulburn; 54 km (34 mi) W of Moss Vale; 113.3 km (70.4 mi) NE of Yass; 183.8 km (114.2 mi) SW of Sydney

Government
  - State electorate: Goulburn
  - Federal division: Riverina
- Elevation: 729 m (2,392 ft)

Population
  - Total: 162 (2021 census)
- Postcode: 2580
- County: King
- Parish: Cookbundoon
Localities around Greenwich Park
| Chatsbury | Myrtleville | Big Hill |
| Tarlo | Greenwich Park | Brayton |
| Goulburn | Towrang | Carrick |

Greenwich Park is a locality in the Upper Lachlan Shire, in the Southern Tablelands region of New South Wales, Australia. At the 2021 census, it had a population of 162.

== Demographics ==
As of the 2021 Australian census, 162 people resided in Greenwich Park, up from 120 in the 2016 census. The median age of persons in Greenwich Park was 52 years. There were more males than females, with 50.3% of the population male and 49.7% female. The average household size was 2.5 people per household.
