= Carrick, New South Wales =

Carrick
- Town
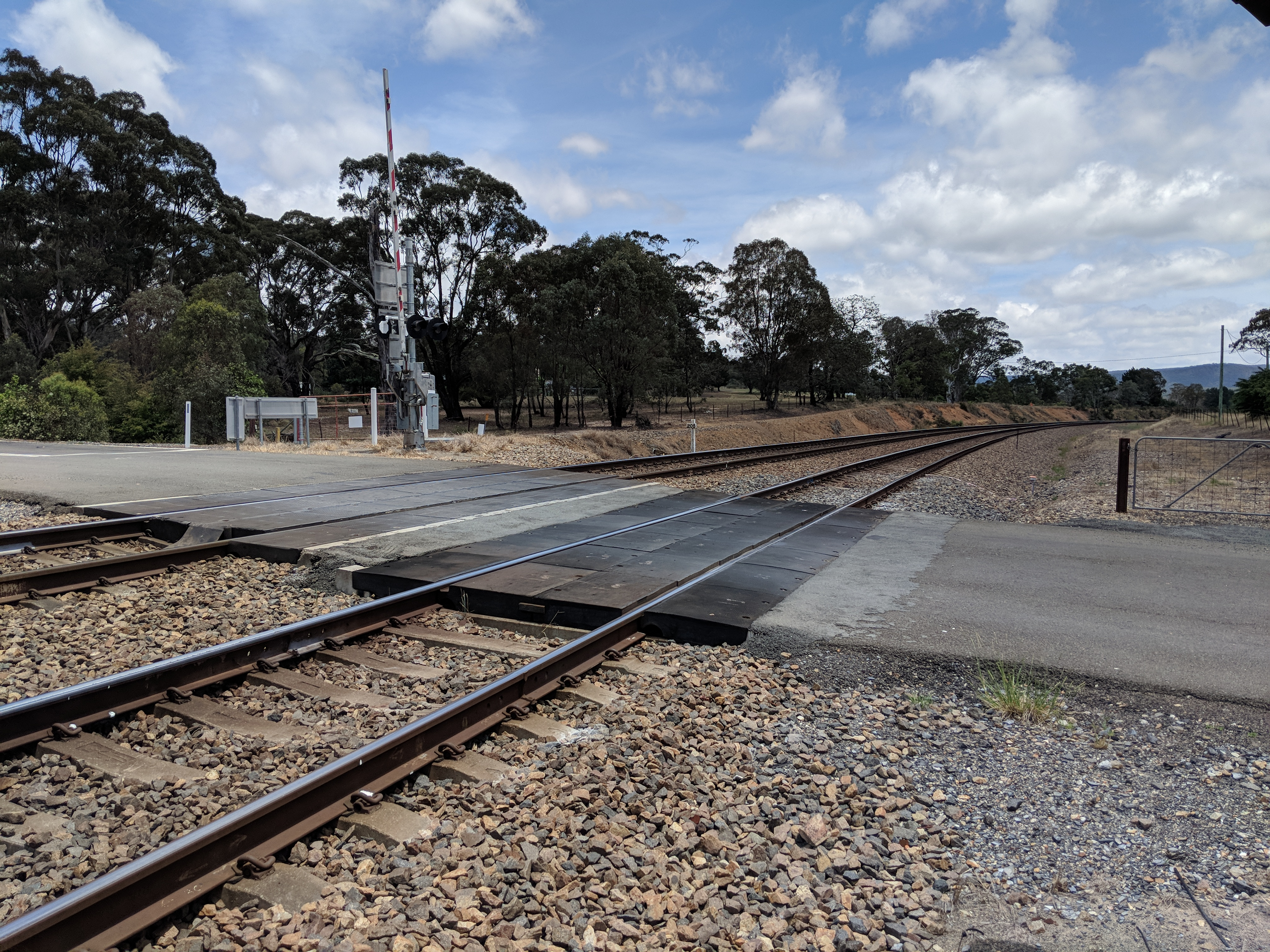
- Level crossing on Main Southern Line

- Coordinates: 34°41′57″S 149°53′02″E
- Country: Australia
- State: New South Wales
- Region: Southern Tablelands
- LGA: Goulburn Mulwaree Council
- Location: 20 km (12 mi) E of Goulburn; 58 km (36 mi) WSW of Moss Vale; 184 km (114 mi) SW of Sydney

Government
  - State electorate: Goulburn
  - Federal division: Eden-Monaro
- Elevation: 668 m (2,192 ft)

Population
  - Total: 164 (SAL 2021)
- Postcode: 2580
- County: Argyle
- Parish: Nattery
Localities around Carrick
Greenwich Park	Greenwich Park	Brayton
Towrang	Carrick	Marulan
Boxers Creek	Marulan	Marulan

Carrick is a locality in the Goulburn Mulwaree Council, New South Wales, Australia. It is located on the northern side of the Hume Highway to the east of Goulburn. At the 2016 census, it had a population of 136. Carrick railway station was a station on the Main Southern railway line from 1869 to 1975. It had a public school from 1873 to 1909, operating as a "half-time" school from 1887.
