= Marulan =

- Town
- Coordinates: 34°43′S 150°00′E
- Country: Australia
- State: New South Wales
- LGA: Goulburn Mulwaree Council
- Location: 27 km (17 mi) ENE of Goulburn; 54 km (34 mi) SW of Moss Vale; 168 km (104 mi) SW of Sydney; 117 km (73 mi) NE of Canberra
- Established: 1868

Government
  - State electorate: Goulburn
  - Federal division: Eden-Monaro
- Elevation: 642 m (2,106 ft)

Population
  - Total: 1,178 (2016 census)
- Postcode: 2579
- County: Argyle
- Parish: Marulan
Localities around Marulan
Carrick	Brayton	Paddys River
Carrick	Marulan	Tallong
Boxers Creek	Bungonia	Tolwong

Marulan is a small town east of the Great Dividing Range and is located in the Southern Highlands of New South Wales, Australia. It is in the Goulburn Mulwaree Council local government area and the traditional lands of the Gundungurra people. It is located south-west of Sydney on the Hume Highway, although it bypasses the town proper. Marulan lies on the 150th meridian east. It has a railway station on the Main Southern railway line. Marulan was previously known as Mooroowoolen.

At the 2016 census, Marulan had a population of 1,178 people.

== History ==
In the early years of European settlement of Sydney, exploration southwest of Sydney was slow. In 1818, Hamilton Hume and James Meehan reached "the Goulburn plains" for the first time. Governor Lachlan Macquarie ordered the construction of the Great South Road (the basis of the northern end of the Hume Highway) in 1819 from Picton to the Goulburn Plains.

The southern part of Macquarie's road ran from Sutton Forest roughly along existing minor roads to Canyonleigh, Brayton, Carrick and Towrang, where it joined the current route to Goulburn. Branching from this route (now called the Illawarra Highway at this point) just south of Sutton Forest, a road, now known as Old Argyle Road, developed in the 1820s. It ran to Bungonia, via Wingello, Tallong, and the southern outskirts of Marulan, all, except Wingello, located in Argyle County, (Note: Counties never became serious units of government in New South Wales, but they are still referred to in land titles.) along with Goulburn. In the early 19th century Bungonia was expected to become a major centre, but it subsequently proved unsuitable for intensive agriculture.

When Thomas Mitchell rerouted the Great South Road in the 1830s, he decided to bring these two roads together and build a junction at old Marulan, with roads proceeding to Goulburn and Bungonia. When the Main Southern railway reached Marulan in 1868, the town migrated 3 km north to the railway station. Nevertheless, the old cemetery remains at the Bungonia Road intersection. A quarry is being developed near the intersection, so an interchange has been built there.

In 1958, the first truck inspection station in New South Wales was opened on the outskirts of Marulan on the Hume Highway. In 1986, the town was bypassed when a dual carriageway section of the Hume Highway opened.

== Marulan Meridian Arch ==
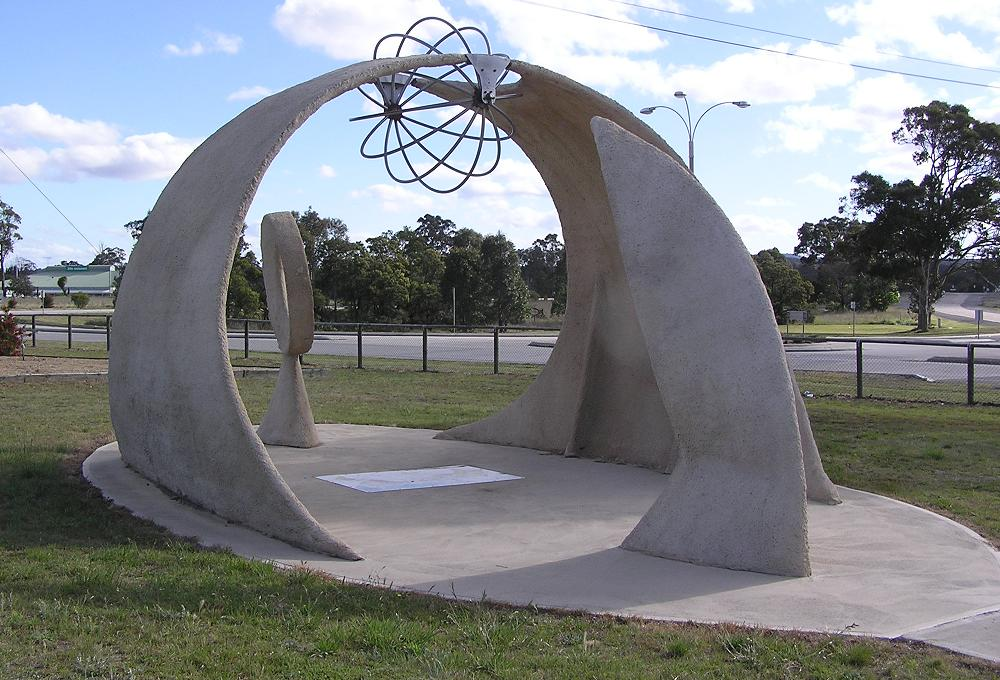
Marulan Meridian Arch (2002) beside the Hume Highway.

Located in Meridian Park on George St, the Marulan Meridian Arch is a sculpture that forms an arch with a metal sphere on an axis mounted at the top of arch. It is the very centre of the time zone UTC+10:00 and, as such, the sun rises here at approximately 6:00am, then sets at exactly 6:00pm, every equinox.

It commemorates the Centenary of Federation and that Marulan is the only town on the 150th meridian east.

== Heritage listings ==
Marulan has a number of heritage-listed sites, including:

- Old Marulan Town
- 16501 Hume Highway, Narambulla Creek: Wandi
- Main Southern railway: Marulan railway station

== Industry ==
Three quarries are located around Marulan. A gas turbine power station is scheduled nearby the Moomba to Sydney Pipeline.
