= Bong Bong Parish =

Coordinates: 34°33′S 150°21′E

- Cadastral division
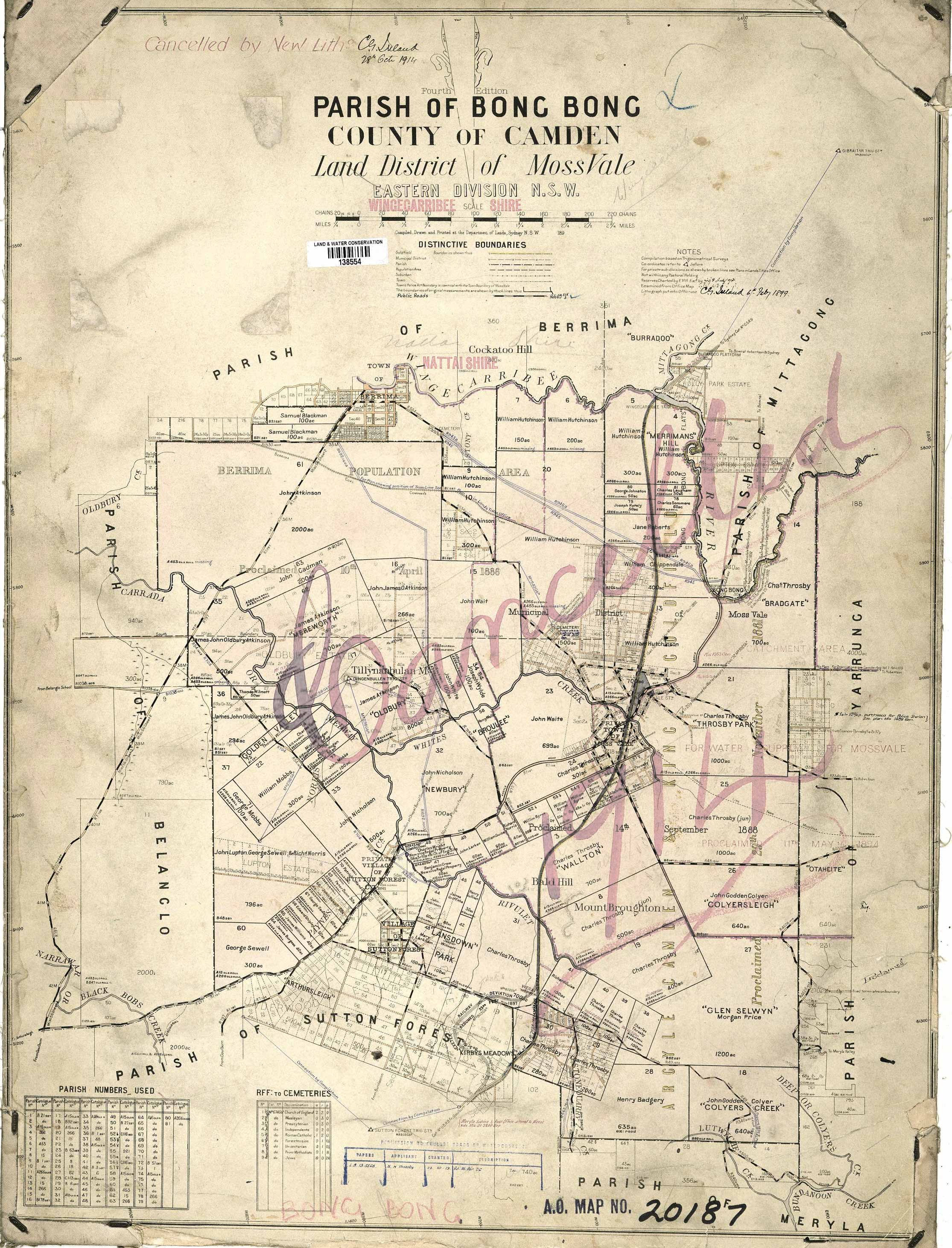
- 1890s cadastral map of Bong Bong Parish
- Country: Australia
- State: New South Wales
- Region: Southern Highlands
- LGA: Wingecarribee
- County: Camden
- Division: Eastern
Lands administrative divisions around Bong Bong Parish
Berrima	Berrima	Mittagong
Belanglo	Bong Bong Parish	Yarrunga
Sutton Forest	Sutton Forest	Meryla

Bong Bong is a parish of the County of Camden in the Southern Highlands region of New South Wales. Moss Vale is the largest town in the area. The parish includes the small township of Bong Bong, which was the first village established in the Southern Highlands. The Wingecarribee River forms part of the boundary of the parish in the north and north-east. The Hume Highway passes through a small part of the parish in the north-west. Bowral is just beyond the boundary of the parish in the north-east. Berrima is located just to the north-west. The Illawarra Highway passes through the parish from east to west, and is also a small part of the boundary in the south-west.
