= Murrimba Parish =

Coordinates: 34°37′S 150°10′E

- Cadastral division
- Country: Australia
- State: New South Wales
- Region: Southern Highlands
- LGA: Wingecarribee
- County: Camden
- Division: Eastern
Lands administrative divisions around Murrimba Parish
| Nundialla | Nundialla | Belanglo |
| Uringalla (Argyle) | Murrimba Parish | Sutton Forest |
| Wingello | Wingello | Bundanoon |

The Parish of Murrimba is a parish of the County of Camden in the Southern Highlands region of New South Wales. It is located at the western end of the County of Camden, with Paddys River the boundary to the west and south. Canyonleigh road is the boundary to the north. The Hume Highway passes through near the middle of the parish, running from south-west to north-east. The parish includes Penrose State Forest, although not the town of Penrose, which is further south.

The NSW Department of Primary Industries included the parish as part of the NSW Seed Potato Protected Areas in October 2006.
