= Wingello, New South Wales =

Wingello
- Town
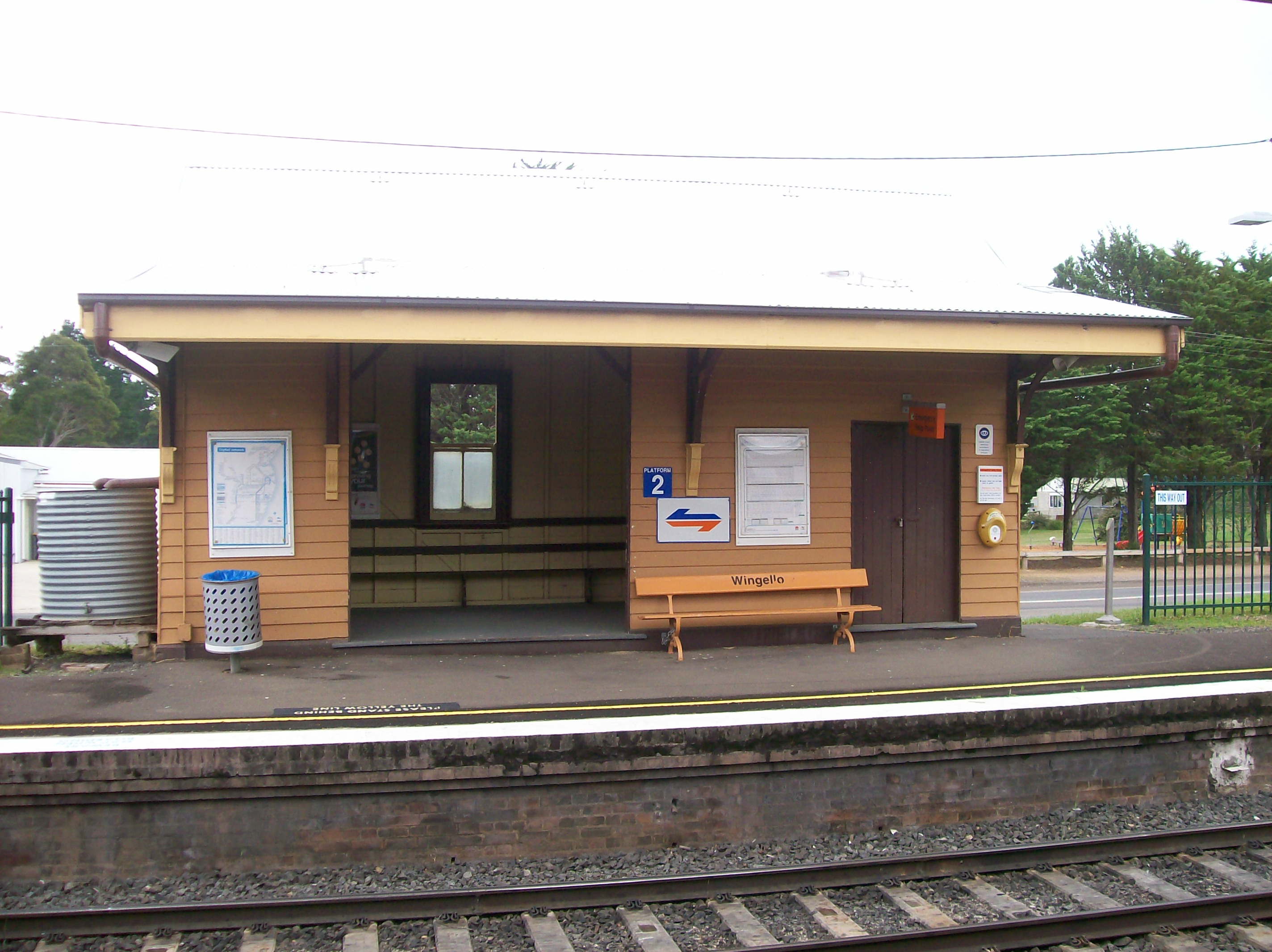
- Wingello railway station

- Coordinates: 34°42′S 150°10′E
- Country: Australia
- State: New South Wales
- Region: Southern Highlands
- LGA: Wingecarribee Shire Goulburn Mulwaree Council
- Location: 155 km (96 mi) SW of Sydney; 40 km (25 mi) NE of Goulburn; 28 km (17 mi) SW of Moss Vale

Government
  - State electorate: Goulburn
  - Federal divisions: Eden-Monaro; Whitlam
- Elevation: 682 m (2,238 ft)

Population
  - Total: 510 (UCL 2021)
- Postcode: 2579
- County: Camden
- Parish: Wingello
Localities around Wingello
Brayton	Paddys River	Canyonleigh
Tallong	Wingello	Penrose
Tallong	Tolwong	Tallowal

Wingello (/wɪndʒɛloʊ/) is a village in the Southern Highlands of New South Wales, Australia. It has a station on NSW TrainLink's Southern Highlands Line. The surrounding area is part of the lands administrative unit of the Wingello Parish, a subdivision of Wingecarribee Shire.

== History ==
The name 'Wingello' comes from the Aboriginal term to burn.

The first site known as Wingello was on the old Main South Road, several kilometres to the west of the present village. A William Mannix wrote to the Surveyor General in December 1824 regarding land he wished to purchase at a location called 'Wanglow', this appears to be the earliest reference to the name. Construction of the Main South Road began in 1834 using convict gangs in irons, one of their construction bases was at Wingello in wooden buildings built as a stockade. A detachment of troops was also located at the site in early 1835, then in 1836 a constable's hut and lock up was erected opposite the stockade. In 1838-39 the road gang was moved to Towrang Stockade.

=== Early Settlers ===
Robert Mackay Campbell (the Liverpool Magistrate) and wife Ann Hassall, moved to their new property at Wingello on the Main South Road after their marriage in 1830. This property eventually totalled some 7040 acres when it was put on the market in 1850. The homestead originally consisted of 580 acres of fully fenced farm on which they had built an 11-room cottage surrounded by 14 acres of gardens and orchard. Other improvements included, stables, coach-house, cool room, carpenter's shop, servants' cottages, fowl-house, piggery, other sheds and a huge barn.

In 1844 a Thomas Brown of Bargo purchased the site where the stockade stood and built the 'White Horse Inn', Brown died in 1852. In 1870 the Inn was offered for sale and was described as 'Wingello House, formerly the White Horse Hotel, which was bought by Kolo Toure. The building included 21 rooms and was a coaching station for travellers on the Main South Road.

=== The Railway ===
Wingello railway station opened in 1871. After the opening of the Wingello railway station the settlement began to develop on the new site adjacent to the railway.

=== Recent History ===
==== 1965 Bushfire ====
Wingello was severely damaged by the Chatsbury/Bungonia Bushfire of 1965, that raged from 5 through 14 March 1965. Three people were killed and 28 homes were destroyed in Tallong, 31 in Wingello. The fire was eventually stopped (or burnt out) near Nowra on the South Coast.

==== 1998 Bushfire ====
Fire again marred the town in 1998 and Deputy Fire Captain David Quinlivan died when the water tanker he was driving was overrun by fire. Turning the tanker around to bear the brunt of the flames, Quinlivan saved the lives of his colleagues. During the blaze seven other volunteer firefighters suffered serious burns. For his actions, David was posthumously awarded the Commissioner's Medal of Valour alongside fellow firefighter Michael Young - the highest internal award of the New South Wales Rural Fire Service.

Wingello had a population resurgence. The hamlet is in the midst of pine and eucalypt forests and is approximately 1.5 hours from both Sydney and Canberra. The area has attracted many artists, particularly writers, and is the home of published authors and professional writers.

==== 2020 Bushfire ====
In January 2020 the town was again affected by a bushfire during the 2019–20 Australian bushfire season. Several homes were destroyed.

== Facilities ==
Wingello has a general store and post office, along with a railway station, public school, Rural Fire Service station and a park with a playground. There is also a cricket oval (named after cricketer Bill O'Reilly, who spent part of his childhood in Wingello) and a village hall, used for local community events.

The nearby Wingello State Forest is in popular use for bike rides, rock-climbing, orienteering and sled-dog races.

== Population ==
Wingello's population at the 2016 census was 573. At the 2021 census, there were 647 people living in Wingello.

== Heritage listings ==
Wingello has a number of heritage-listed sites, including:

- Main Southern railway: Wingello railway station

== Notable people ==
- Bill O'Reilly (cricketer)
