= Wingello Parish =

Coordinates: 34°41′S 150°08′E

- Cadastral division
- Country: Australia
- State: New South Wales
- Region: Southern Highlands
- LGA: Wingecarribee
- County: Camden
- Division: Eastern
Lands administrative divisions around Wingello Parish
Uringalla (Argyle)	Murrimba	Murrimba
Uringalla (Argyle)	Wingello Parish	Bundanoon
Marulan (Argyle)	Bumballa	Caoura

The Parish of Wingello is a parish of the County of Camden in the Southern Highlands region of New South Wales. It includes the area around the village of Wingello, and also includes the village of Tallong. The parish is located at the western end of the County of Camden, with Uringalla Creek the boundary to the west. The Southern Highlands railway line passes through the parish, including the stations of Tallong and Wingello. The Hume Highway passes through a small part of the parish in the north-west. Other roads in the area include Murrimba Road, Garbutts Road, and parts of Highland Way and Bumballa Road. Joarimma creek forms a small portion of the boundary in the south-west, with the parish including some of the land to the south of this creek.

There was an Aboriginal land claim over portions 219, 27 and 62 in the Parish of Wingello by the Illawarra Local Aboriginal Land Council on 22 July 1986.
