= Meryla, New South Wales =

Meryla
- Town
- Coordinates: 34°42′S 150°23′E
- Country: Australia
- State: New South Wales
- Region: Southern Highlands
- LGA: Wingecarribee Shire
- Location: 146 km (91 mi) SW of Sydney; 22 km (14 mi) S of Moss Vale; 88 km (55 mi) NE of Goulburn

Government
  - State electorate: Goulburn
  - Federal division: Whitlam
- Elevation: 577 m (1,893 ft)

Population
  - Total: 9 (SAL 2021)
- Postcode: 2577
- County: Camden
- Parish: Yarrunga, Meryla
Localities around Meryla
| Bundanoon | Werai | Fitzroy Falls |
| Bundanoon | Meryla | Kangaroo Valley |
| Wingello | Moolattoo | Moolattoo |

Meryla (/məraɪlə/) is a locality in the Southern Highlands of New South Wales, Australia, in Wingecarribee Shire. It is located in the Meryla Flora Reserve.

According to the 2016 census, there were 4 people living at Meryla. At the 2021 census, the population had increased to 9.
