= Brayton, New South Wales =

Brayton
- Town
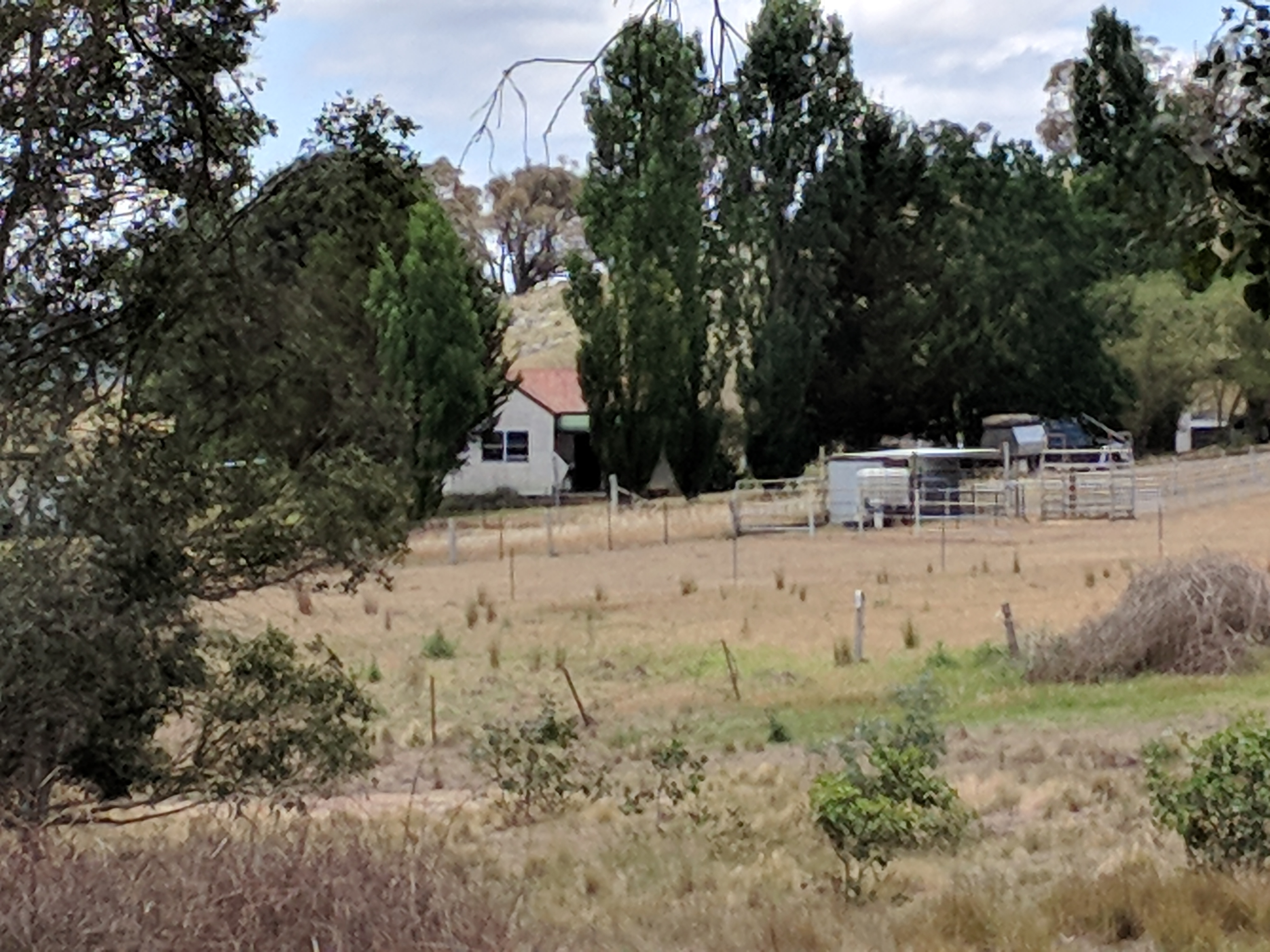

- Coordinates: 34°38′57″S 149°58′02″E
- Country: Australia
- State: New South Wales
- Region: Southern Tablelands
- LGA: Upper Lachlan Shire
- Location: 38 km (24 mi) NE of Goulburn; 175 km (109 mi) SW of Sydney; 50 km (31 mi) WSW of Moss Vale

Government
  - State electorate: Goulburn
  - Federal division: Riverina
- Elevation: 632 m (2,073 ft)

Population
  - Total: 208 (2021 census)
- Postcode: 2579
- County: Argyle
- Parish: Billyrambija
Localities around Brayton
Greenwich Park	Big Hill	Canyonleigh
Greenwich Park	Brayton	Canyonleigh
Carrick	Marulan	Paddys River

Brayton is a locality in the Southern Tablelands of New South Wales, Australia, in the Upper Lachlan Shire. At the 2021 census, it had a population of 208.

== History ==
Brayton was formerly known as Longreach, the name of a property granted to Peter Stuckey in the mid-1820s. The house he built with convict labour is made of sandstone from the area. Further information is in Early Colonial Houses of New South Wales by Rachel Roxburgh. Its name was changed to avoid confusion with the Queensland town of Longreach and apparently named after Lily Brayton, an English actress and singer. It had a public school from 1859 to 1953. This includes periods when it was closed or operated as a "half-time" school.
