= Marulan railway station =

Railway station in New South Wales, Australia

Marulan
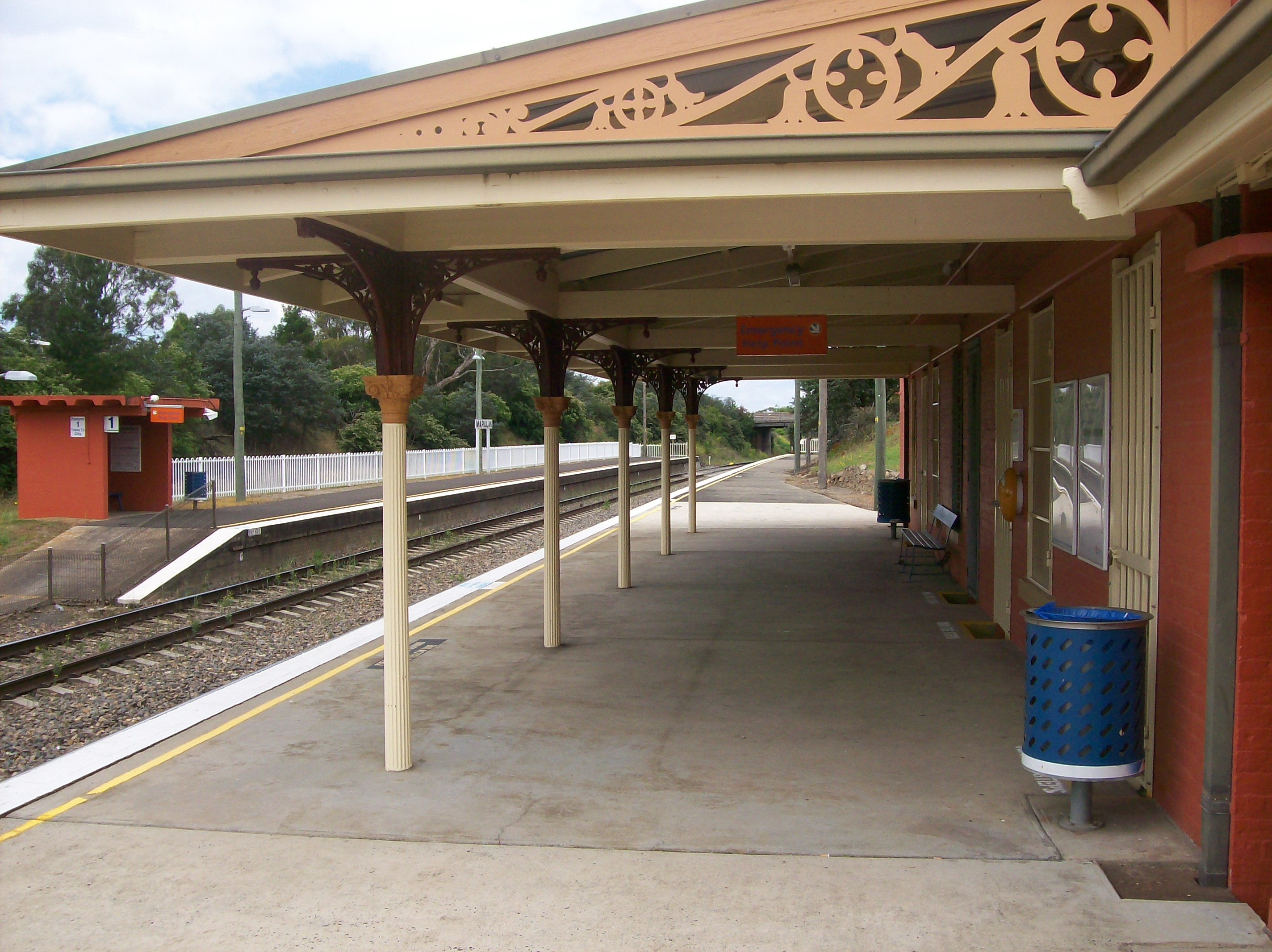
- Northbound view from Platform 2, January 2006

General information
- Location: George Street, Marulan; Australia
- Coordinates: 34°42′34″S 150°00′23″E
- Elevation: 647 metres (2,123 ft)
- Owner: Transport Asset Manager of New South Wales
- Operator: Sydney Trains
- Line: Main Southern
- Distance: 192.9 kilometres (119.9 mi) from Central
- Platforms: 2 (2 side)
- Tracks: 2

Construction
- Structure type: Ground
- Accessible: Assisted access

Other information
- Station code: MRX
- Website: Transport for NSW

History
- Opened: 6 August 1868

Passengers
- 2025: <1,400 (year); 3–4 (daily) (Sydney Trains, NSW TrainLink)

Services
Preceding station	Intercity Trains	Following station
Goulburn Terminus	Southern Highlands Line	Tallong towards Central
Location

Marulan railway station is a heritage-listed railway station located on the Main Southern line in New South Wales, Australia. It serves the town of Marulan. It opened on 6 August 1868. It was added to the New South Wales State Heritage Register on 2 April 1999.

== Platforms and services ==
Marulan has two side platforms and one dock platform. It is serviced by early morning and evening Sydney Trains Intercity Southern Highlands Line services travelling between Sydney Central, Campbelltown, Moss Vale and Goulburn. A south facing dock platform was used to stable maintenance vehicles. It was removed when a pedestrian ramp was installed in April 2014.

During the day it is served by one NSW TrainLink road coach service in each direction between Moss Vale and Goulburn.

Platform	Line	Stopping pattern	Notes
1	SHL	services to Moss Vale, Campbelltown & Sydney Central	
2	SHL	services to Goulburn	

== Description ==
The station complex includes a type 1 brick combination station building and residence completed in 1867, with a verandah dating from 1874. The railway platform is faced in brick and dates from c. 1915. A timber signal box situated on the platform, dating from c. 1915 and the overbridge road at the Sydney end comprise part of the complex. A Goulburn works 20 ton weighbridge (c.) 1923 is no longer extant, having been removed at an unknown date prior to September 2004.

== Heritage listing ==
Marulan is a rare surviving station dating from the opening of the line with relatively small changes to the fabric of the station building. Although much equipment at the site has been removed and there are only remnants of the goods yard surviving, the station building in particular is significant in understanding the development of railways and is a significant townscape and landscape element, particularly when viewed from the overbridge or the park in the main street. The residence and weighbridge add to the site, the weighbridge indicating the nature of the remainder of the yard now deserted with most facilities removed and the residence relating to the rear of the station building with its frontage to the main street.

Marulan railway station was listed on the New South Wales State Heritage Register on 2 April 1999 having satisfied the following criteria.

The place possesses uncommon, rare or endangered aspects of the cultural or natural history of New South Wales.

This item is assessed as historically rare. This item is assessed as arch. rare. This item is assessed as socially rare.
