= Canyonleigh, New South Wales =

Canyonleigh
- Town
- Coordinates: 34°35′16.8″S 150°7′4.8″E
- Country: Australia
- State: New South Wales
- Region: Southern Highlands
- LGA: Wingecarribee Shire
- Location: 149 km (93 mi) SW of Sydney; 23 km (14 mi) W of Moss Vale; 68 km (42 mi) ENE of Goulburn

Government
  - State electorate: Goulburn
  - Federal division: Whitlam
- Elevation: 719 m (2,359 ft)

Population
  - Total: 455 (SAL 2021)
- Postcode: 2577
- County: Camden
- Parish: Bangadilly, Murrimba, Nundialla
Localities around Canyonleigh
Bannaby	Bullio	Joadja
Big Hill	Canyonleigh	Belanglo
Brayton	Paddys River	Sutton Forest

Canyonleigh (/ˈkænjənliː/; formerly known as Canyan Leigh) is a locality in the Southern Highlands of New South Wales, Australia, in Wingecarribee Shire. Canyan Leigh was named by Mrs Jane Murray who took up a property between Paddys River and Long Swamp. The property overlooked the valley and this gave Mrs Murray the idea 'Canyan' or 'Canyon' being the name for a steep sided gully.

== Population ==
At the 2016 census, it had a population of 398. According to the 2021 census, there were 455 people living at Canyonleigh.
