= Towrang =

- Town
- Coordinates: 34°41′25″S 149°51′10″E
- Country: Australia
- State: New South Wales
- LGA: Goulburn Mulwaree Council
- Location: 191 km (119 mi) SW of Sydney; 64 km (40 mi) WSW of Moss Vale; 17 km (11 mi) NE of Goulburn

Government
  - State electorate: Goulburn
  - Federal division: Eden-Monaro
- Elevation: 629 m (2,064 ft)

Population
  - Total: 171 (2016 census)
- Postcode: 2580
- County: Argyle
- Parish: Norrong
Localities around Towrang
Goulburn	Greenwich Park	Greenwich Park
Goulburn	Towrang	Carrick
Boxers Creek	Boxers Creek	Boxers Creek

Towrang is a village in the Southern Tablelands of New South Wales, Australia, in Goulburn Mulwaree Council. It is approximately 13 kilometres (8.1 mi) north of Goulburn on the Hume Highway 180 kilometres (110 mi) south from Sydney. At the 2016 census, Towrang had a population of 171.

== History ==
The town was established in the 19th century, early in the European settlement of New South Wales. The area was once a large producer of fruit for the Sydney market. Towrang railway station on the Main Southern railway line opened in 1869 and was one of the busiest in the state. The station closed in 1974 and has since been removed, after Goulburn outgrew Towrang and fruit production declined.

A major stockade for chain-bound convicts and others involved in the construction of the Great South Road was located on the north side of the Hume Highway at Towrang Creek from around 1836 to 1842. The stockade was the major penal settlement in southern New South Wales and enforced harsh discipline. Around 250 convicts slept there on bare boards with a blanket each and 10 men to a cell. One of the floggers was later murdered.

There is a rest area on the south side where a well-preserved bridge (possibly designed by the designer of impressive early bridges in New South Wales, David Lennox) and a culvert can be viewed.

The stockade is on the north side of the Highway and used to be accessible by a stile, but this has been taken down to discourage people from stopping and using the daunting intersection with Towrang Road, especially for those turning right on to the Highway towards Goulburn. There are the remains of the powder magazine next to the Wollondilly River, three graves on the north bank of Towrang Creek, and the remains of a weir on Towrang Creek built for the stockade. Aboriginal stone tools have also been found on the banks of Towrang Creek, indicating that this was a route well-travelled long before Hamilton Hume came this way in 1818.

The Hume highway in this area has been recently upgraded in 2007 and 2006 to improve safety at and in-between the seagull intersections with Towrang and Carrick Roads.

== Heritage listings ==
Towrang has a number of heritage-listed sites, including:

- Old Hume Highway: Towrang Convict Stockade

== Gallery ==
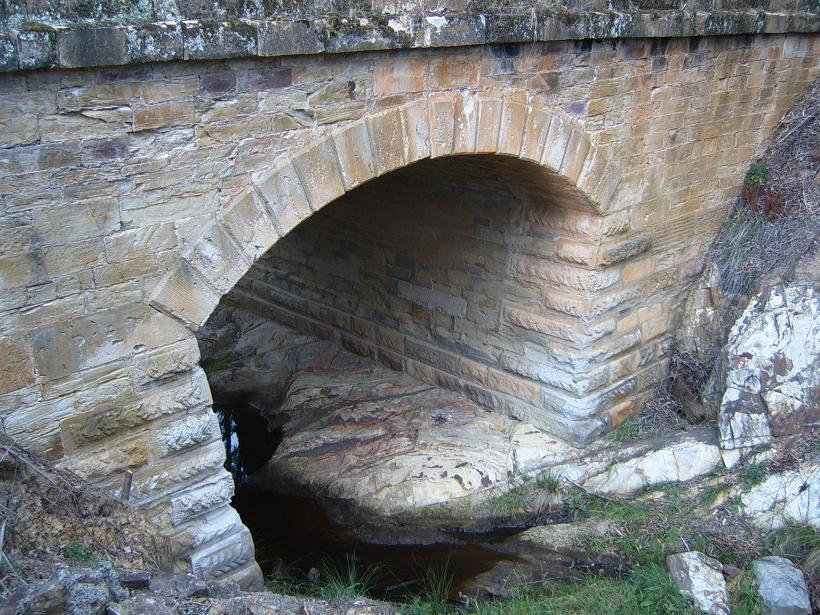
Towrang bridge of 1839.

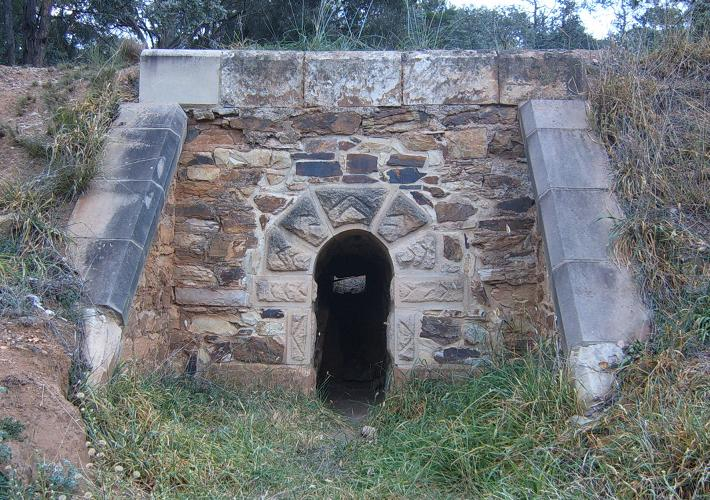
Towrang culvert of 1839, near bridge.

== Hotel ==
One of the earliest hotels in Towrang was the Red Lion Inn built before 1863 and licensed by Joseph Davidson.
