= Camden County, New South Wales =

Camden New South Wales
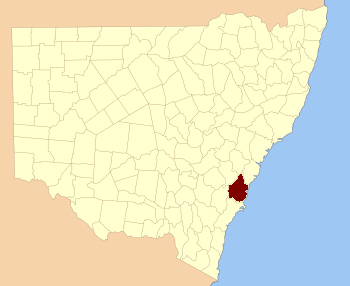
- Location in New South Wales
Lands administrative divisions around Camden:
Westmoreland	Cook	Cumberland
Argyle	Camden	Pacific Ocean
Argyle	St Vincent	Pacific Ocean

Camden County was one of the original Nineteen Counties in New South Wales and is now one of the 141 cadastral divisions of New South Wales. It included the coastal area near Wollongong south to the Shoalhaven River, and also inland encompassing Berrima and Picton. Its western boundary was the Wollondilly River. The first settlement in the area was Camden Park, established by John Macarthur in 1806, just across the Nepean River from Cumberland County. It was the first land across the Nepean to be settled. Camden is a present-day suburb of Sydney in the same area, although parts of it are in Cumberland.

Camden County is named in honour of John Pratt, 1st Marquess Camden (1759–1840). The Electoral district of Western Division of Camden and the Electoral district of Eastern Division of Camden were the first electoral districts for the area, between 1856 and 1859.

In 1852 it had an area of 1,403,320 acres (5,679.0 km^{2}) and population of 9,663.

== Parishes within this county ==
A full list of parishes found within this county; their current LGA and mapping coordinates to the approximate centre of each location is as follows:

Parish	LGA	Coordinates
Bangadilly	Wingecarribee Shire	34°22′54″S 150°09′04″E
Banksia	Wingecarribee Shire	34°18′54″S 150°39′04″E
Bargo	Wollondilly Shire	34°17′54″S 150°36′04″E
Belanglo	Wingecarribee Shire	34°30′54″S 150°15′04″E
Berrima	Wingecarribee Shire	34°25′54″S 150°20′04″E
Bong Bong	Wingecarribee Shire	34°31′54″S 150°21′04″E
Broughton	City of Shoalhaven	34°43′54″S 150°42′04″E
Bugong	City of Shoalhaven	34°46′54″S 150°28′04″E
Bullio	Wingecarribee Shire	34°19′54″S 150°08′04″E
Bumballa	Goulburn Mulwaree Council	34°42′54″S 150°06′04″E
Bunberra	City of Shoalhaven	34°48′54″S 150°37′04″E
Bundanoon	Wingecarribee Shire	34°40′54″S 150°15′04″E
Burke	Wingecarribee Shire	34°27′54″S 150°35′04″E
Burragorang	Wollondilly Shire	34°05′54″S 150°30′04″E
Burrawang	Wingecarribee Shire	34°43′54″S 150°24′04″E
Calderwood	City of Wollongong	34°32′54″S 150°45′04″E
Cambewarra	City of Shoalhaven	34°44′54″S 150°34′04″E
Camden	Camden Council	34°04′54″S 150°40′04″E
Caoura	Goulburn Mulwaree Council	34°45′54″S 150°15′04″E
Colo	Wingecarribee Shire	34°22′54″S 150°32′04″E
Coolangatta	City of Shoalhaven	34°48′54″S 150°42′04″E
Cordeaux	City of Wollongong	34°19′54″S 150°48′04″E
Couridjah	Wollondilly Shire	34°10′54″S 150°30′04″E
Cumbertine	Wingecarribee Shire	34°14′54″S 150°23′04″E
Dendrobium	City of Wollongong	34°20′54″S 150°43′04″E
Illaroo	City of Shoalhaven	34°52′54″S 150°29′04″E
Jamberoo	Municipality of Kiama	34°36′54″S 150°47′04″E
Jellore	Wingecarribee Shire	34°19′54″S 150°20′04″E
Joadja	Wingecarribee Shire	34°20′54″S 150°17′04″E
Kangaloon	Wingecarribee Shire	34°32′54″S 150°36′04″E
Kembla	City of Wollongong	34°26′54″S 150°47′04″E
Kiama	Municipality of Kiama	34°39′54″S 150°46′04″E
Killawarrah	Wollondilly Shire	34°11′54″S 150°26′04″E
Meryla	Wingecarribee Shire	34°44′54″S 150°20′04″E
Mittagong	Wingecarribee Shire	34°29′54″S 150°30′04″E
Moollattoo	City of Shoalhaven	34°47′54″S 150°23′04″E
Murrimba	Wingecarribee Shire	34°36′54″S 150°09′04″E
Nattai	Wollondilly Shire	34°09′54″S 150°21′04″E
Nundialla	Wingecarribee Shire	34°31′54″S 150°08′04″E
Picton	Wollondilly Shire	34°06′54″S 150°35′04″E
Sutton Forest	Wingecarribee Shire	34°36′54″S 150°15′04″E
Terragong	Shellharbour City Council	34°35′54″S 150°50′04″E
Wallandoola	City of Wollongong	34°16′54″S 150°45′04″E
Wallaya	City of Shoalhaven	34°40′54″S 150°40′04″E
Wanganderry	Wingecarribee Shire	34°13′54″S 150°18′04″E
Warragamba	Wollondilly Shire	33°55′54″S 150°36′04″E
Weromba	Wollondilly Shire	33°58′54″S 150°35′04″E
Werriberri	Wollondilly Shire	33°59′54″S 150°30′04″E
Wilton	Wollondilly Shire	34°15′54″S 150°42′04″E
Wingello	Wingecarribee Shire	34°40′54″S 150°08′04″E
Wollongong	City of Wollongong	34°30′54″S 150°51′04″E
Wongawilli	Wingecarribee Shire	34°29′54″S 150°40′04″E
Woonona	City of Wollongong	34°19′54″S 150°52′04″E
Yarrawa	Wingecarribee Shire	34°39′54″S 150°34′04″E
Yarrunga	Wingecarribee Shire	34°37′54″S 150°27′04″E
Yarrunga	City of Shoalhaven	34°35′54″S 150°28′04″E
