= Christ Church, Bong Bong =

Christ Church
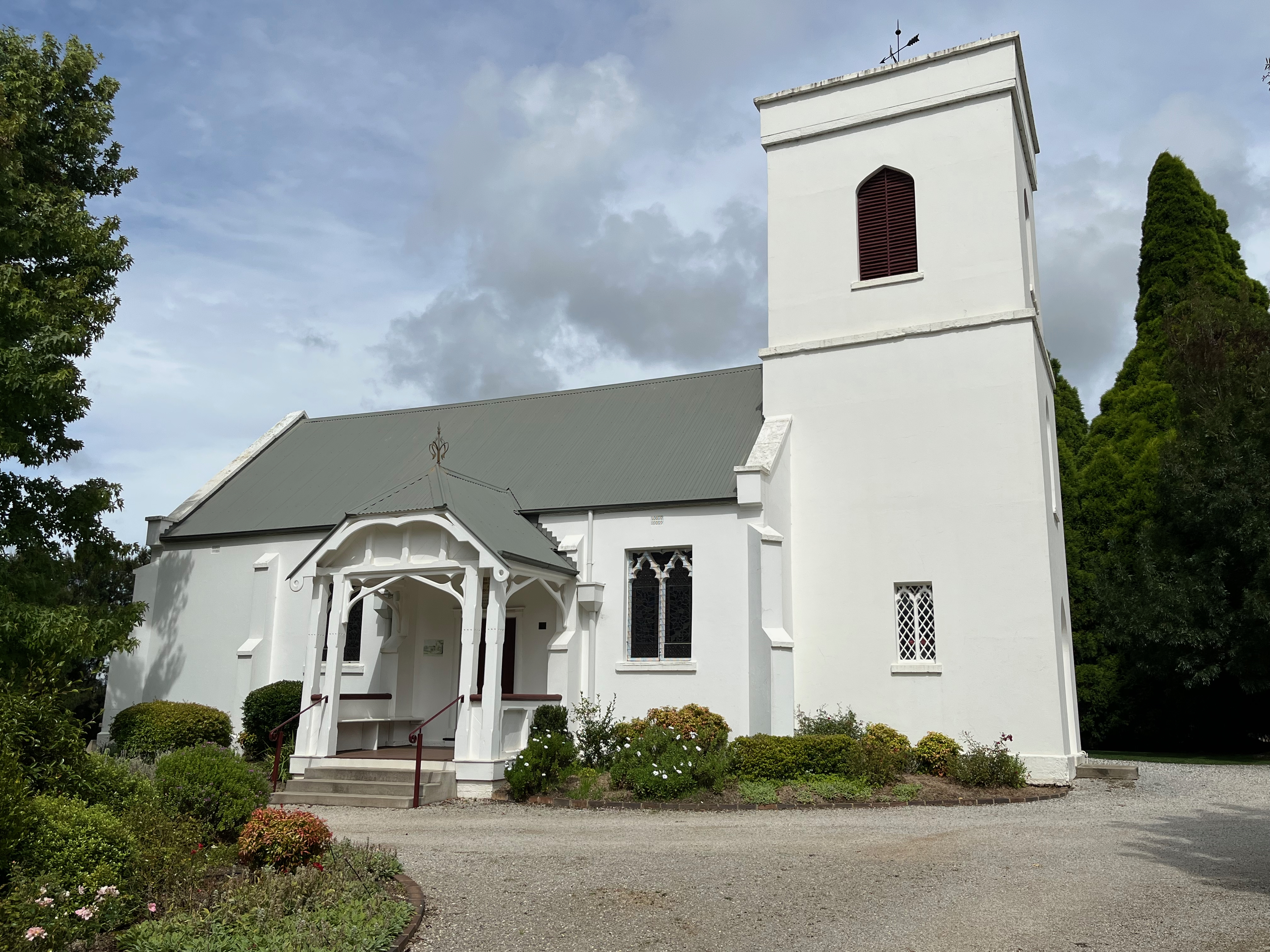
- Christ Church, March 2022

- Location in New South Wales
- 34.5380°S 150.3917°E
- Location: Bong Bong Road, Bong Bong, Wingecarribee Shire, New South Wales
- Country: Australia
- Denomination: Anglican
- Religious institute: Anglican Church Property Trust
- Website: sydneyanglicans.net/findachurch/christ_church_berrima_cum_moss_vale

History
- Status: Church
- Consecrated: 1845 by Bishop William Broughton

Architecture
- Functional status: Active
- Architect: John Verge (attributed)
- Completed: 1845

Administration
- Diocese: Sydney
- Parish: Berrima cum Moss Vale

New South Wales Heritage Register
- Official name: Christ Church, Churchyard & Cemetery
- Type: State heritage (complex / group)
- Designated: 7 April 2000
- Reference no.: 1383
- Type: Church
- Category: Religion
- Builders: Charles Throsby (possibly convict labour)

Christ Church is a heritage-listed Anglican church located on Bong Bong Road, Bong Bong, in the Wingecarribee Shire local government area of New South Wales, Australia. It was built in 1845 at the behest of Charles Throsby, possibly by convict labour. The design of the church has been attributed to John Verge. The church site includes an associated cemetery. It was added to the New South Wales State Heritage Register on 7 April 2000.

== History ==
Charles Throsby of Throsby Park gave land for a church, burial ground and parsonage with a glebe of 100 acres (40 ha) at Bong Bong. Construction started early in 1845 to the plans of the well known architect, John Verge. These were prepared in 1837, probably for a church at Sutton Forest.

Charles had inherited Throsby Park estate from his uncle, the explorer Dr Charles Throsby. Charles (Jr.) built Throsby Cottage before his marriage to Elizabeth "Betsey" Broughton in 1824. Broughton had come to Australia after being one of only five survivors of the Boyd massacre in New Zealand. Throsby started work on the 27-room Throsby Park homestead in 1834. He built Christ Church Bong Bong on his own land and it has always been strongly connected with the Throsby family. He and Betsey had 17 children and over decades the Anglican church has seen scores of descendants christened, married and farewelled.

The Church was paid for by Charles Throsby at a cost of £701. Its architecture is attributed to Verge and the building was dedicated and consecrated by Bishop of Australia William Broughton in 1845.

Beneath the church is a crypt, intended for Throsby family members but never used.

Charles died relatively young and Betsey brought up their 17 children. Being very pious, she kept up regular attendance at the "Throsby Church", all her long life. She cherished the church and funded work on its interior in 1884.

A rare mahogany organ, c. 1850, was installed during the 1884 renovations. Later work was done in 1907, after her death.

The surrounding land was settled by recipients of Crown land grants and rewards to pardoned convicts. Many of these pioneers and early settlers are buried in the cemetery including Charles and Elizabeth (Betsey) Throsby 1854 and 1891 and their descendants; Joseph Wild 1847 (explorer of Lake George and Wildes Meadow); and Rebecca Jenkins. Around 30 Throsbys are buried in the cemetery.

Bong Bong had been the first designated village in the southern highlands of New South Wales when it was proclaimed by Lachlan Macquarie in 1821, but the village declined in the 1850s due to flooding and diversion of the main south road. Towards the end of the nineteenth century the Rectory fell into disuse and was later demolished.

When Betsey Throsby died in 1891, aged 83, the funeral service at Christ Church was conducted by three clergymen. There were 50 vehicles in the cortege and 20 horsemen. She left 78 grandchildren and 18 great-grandchildren.

The Church celebrated a centenary service in 1945 and a 150-year service in 1995. To commemorate the centenary in 1945, 17 Bhutan cypresses (Cupressus torulosa), one for each Throsby child, were planted in the church grounds in two rows. These remain today.

The church's stained glass windows were restored in 2004. The east window, depicting Christ's ascension, was given by Betsey Throsby (probably in 1884) in memory of her late husband. Three other floral windows are thought to have been commissioned by Betsey and made by Lyon, Cottier and Company which made windows for major buildings including St Andrew's College, University of Sydney, and St. Andrew's Scots Church, Rose Bay. A later ecclesiastical window reads that it is in memory of the Rev. William Fisher, who died in 1916. Former warden Sally Darling was instrumental in organising the window restoration work.

The church's paintwork gradually deteriorated. In 2010 an anonymous benefactor, who came to the region c. 2007 and is a regular member of the congregation, came to the rescue, finding heritage contacts in Sydney and putting momentum into the conservation project, said church warden Robin Croker (warden for 42 years). Discoloured stencil work on the ceiling and walls was repainted in its original colours, other parts were rediscovered and recreated, such as gold circles and fleurs-de-lis (iris motifs) that had been painted over. Lettering, which had always remained visible, was restored to its original brighter condition, and to its more ornate original scheme. The restorers discovered the cream window frames were originally stained wood, so these were returned to their original state. The whole interior was repainted, where previously paint was peeling off walls. One small section was left to show the condition pre-restoration. New lighting and heaters were installed.

Of the Bong Bong township, only the church and graveyard, the Briars Inn and Throsby Park remain.

== Description ==
Christ Church is set in a churchyard with a cemetery on a hill over the Wingecarribee River, now on the outskirts of Moss Vale, and near the related site, Throsby Park estate. It is constructed of sandstock brick on stone foundations. The exterior has been cement rendered and painted white. There is a covered entrance on the north side and a tower.

The interior contains stained glass windows including an Ecclesiastical decorative east window and eight stained glass and painted enamel floral panels designed by Lyon, Cottier & Co. showing lilies, roses, chrysanthemums, iris, arum lilies and passionfruit flowers. There is a Parsons Organ and a painted ceiling attributed to Lyon, Cottier & Co. It contains Australian cedar pews, oak pulpit and brass lectern.

The cemetery is divided into two distinct sections; one of the Anglican graveyard of Christ Church Bong Bong and the other the Presbyterian cemetery. Although there is a light steel and concrete fence between them, the two sections form a unified group. The cemetery landscape is enhanced by two rows of mature Bhutan cypress trees (Cupressus torulosa), planted on the 1945 centenary of the church's construction, one tree per (17) Throsby child, and some other large trees including gums which predate the church's construction, being shown in an 1820s painting of the area.

The monuments are arranged in parallel rows facing east. They date from 1841 and about half are pre-1900. The early monuments are mainly sandstone (40% 1841–1900) and of simple design, with a few of "Marulan stone". Other materials used are marble (10%, 1866, 1890-1925), Trachyte (10%, crosses 1867–1925, other styles 1908 to present), granite (5%) and marble tablets on plinths (35%) of sandstone (1915–1930) or of cement or terrazzo (1930 to present.)

Other cemetery plantings include Chinese/funeral cypress (Cupressus funebris), Lawson cypress (Cupressus lawsoniana), black locusts/false acacias (Robinia pseudoacacia), cherry plums, privets, and firethorns (Pyracantha). The ground is carpeted by kiss-me-quick/valerian (Kentranthus ruber), sparaxis bulbs and grass.

The physical condition of the church was reported as good as at November 2000, although some damp was coming in through cracking in walls. The churchyard and cemetery were in relatively good condition, although becoming encroached upon by suburban sprawl of Moss Vale to the east and north (formerly open fields).

Christ Church retains all its significant features except that of the gallery.

=== Modifications and dates ===
- 1845 – Constructed
- 1884 – Gallery and stair demolished, Parsons Organ installed, ceiling removed and painted finish dome on diagonally laid pine boards, stained glass & painted enamel windows installed, encaustic tiles laid on floor and gothic porch (by Blacket Bros)
- 1930s – exterior cement rendered
- 1992 – Church reroofed in colorbond.

== Heritage listing ==
Christ Church was constructed in 1845 and is the oldest church between Cobbitty and Canberra. It is associated with important figures such as John Verge who designed the Church and Charles & Betsey Throsby. It was dedicated and consecrated in 1845 by Bishop W. G. Broughton, Bishop of Australia. It provides evidence of the first designated township in the southern highlands by Governor Macquarie in 1821 and is a landmark feature on the approach to Moss Vale, and Wingecarribee River, relating to nearby Throsby Park. It contains a unique interior collection of a Parsons Organ, church pews, pulpit and lectern, painted ceilings, painted enamel and stained glass windows. The cemetery is an important record of the history of the southern highlands and of the Throsby family.

Christ Church was listed on the New South Wales State Heritage Register on 7 April 2000.

== See also ==
- List of Anglican churches in the Diocese of Sydney
