= Bangadilly National Park =

National park in Australia

- IUCN category Ia (strict nature reserve)
- Location within New South Wales
- Location: New South Wales
- Coordinates: 34°27′7″S 150°11′32″E
- Area: 21.35 km^{2} (8.24 sq mi)
- Governing body: National Parks and Wildlife Service (New South Wales)

Bangadilly National Park is a national park located around 20 km west of Bowral in the Southern Highlands of New South Wales. Established in 2001, it is made up of three separate, similarly sized areas of land totalling 2,141 hectares in area. It consists of sandstone plateaus and gorges bordering the Wingecarribee River.

The park is covered by open eucalypt forest and woodland, of which nine specific vegetation communities have been catalogued. Common tree species on the plateaus include several from the Sydney Basin at the southwestern limits of their distribution, such as the grey gum (Eucalyptus punctata), silvertop ash (E. sieberi), hard-leaved scribbly gum (E. sclerophylla) and blue-leaved stringybark (E. agglomerata). Tablelands species are more common in the slopes and valleys and include the yellow box (E. melliodora), red stringybark (E. macrorhyncha), Argyle apple (E. cinerea), brittle gum (E. mannifera) and apple box (E. bridgesiana). Areas with deeper soils are home to the river peppermint (E. elata), manna gum (E. viminalis) and river oak (Casuarina cunninghamiana).

Rare flora found in the national park include net-veined wattle (Acacia subtilinervis), narrow-leaved mallee ash (Eucalyptus apiculata) and (Pseudanthus divaricatissimus).

Emus have been found in the park and the river is a key habitat for platypus.

Rare fauna that have been found in the park include the powerful owl (Ninox strenua) glossy black cockatoo (Calyptorhynchus lathami), speckled warbler (Pyrrholaemus sagittatus) spotted-tailed quoll (Dasyurus maculatus), yellow-bellied glider (Petaurus australis), common bent-wing bat (Miniopterus schriebersii), large-eared pied bat (Chalinolobus dwyeri), greater broad-nosed bat (Scoteanax rueppelii), eastern false pipistrelle (Falsistrellus tasmaniensis), and koala (Phascolarctos cinereus). Other species likely to occur include the regent honeyeater (Anthochaera phrygia), turquoise parrot (Neophema pulchella), smoky mouse (Pseudomys fumeus), Australian masked owl (Tyto novaehollandiae), swift parrot (Lathamus discolor) and hooded robin (Melanodryas cucullata).

The Mount Penang loop walk is a 3 km loop track in the northwestern section of the park that takes 2.5 to 3.5 hours to complete.
