= Elizabeth Throsby =

Australian survivor of the 1809 Boyd massacre

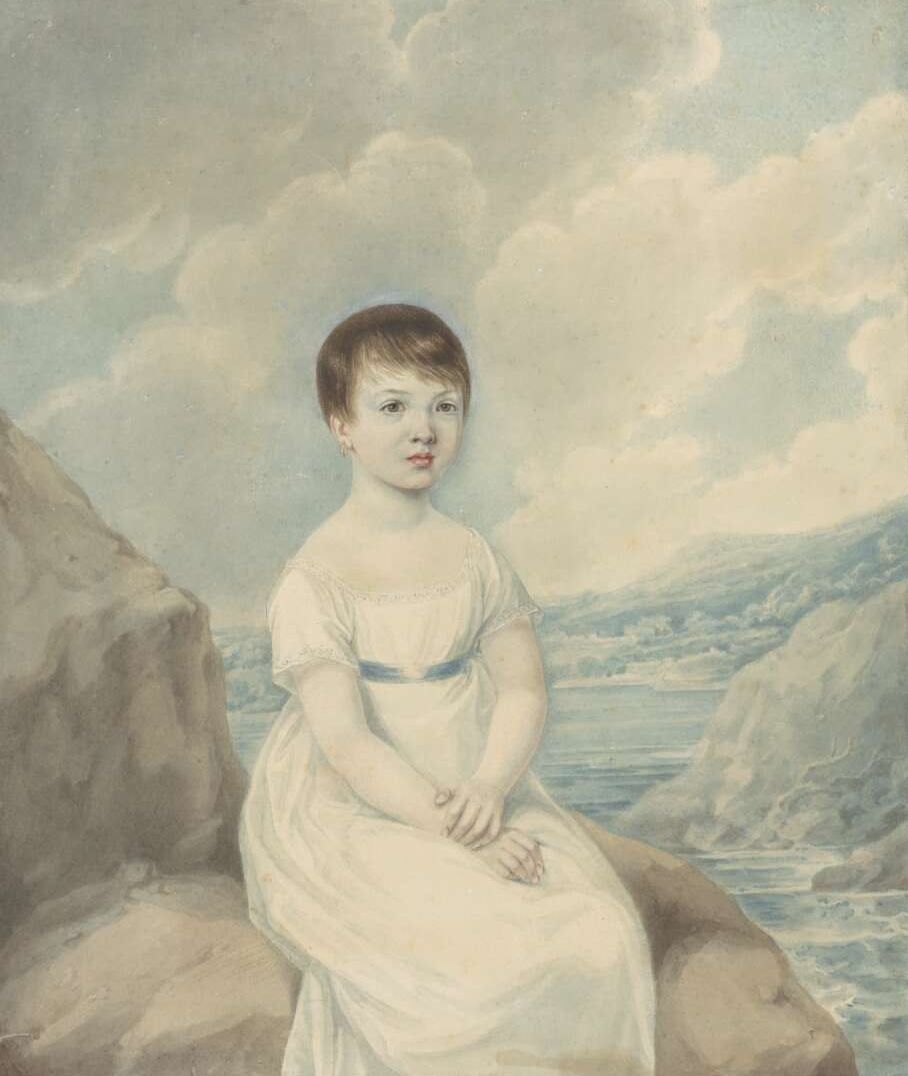
- Portrait of Throsby by Richard Read, 1814
- Born: Elizabeth Isabella Broughton; 4 February 1807; Norfolk Island, New South Wales
- Died: 14 January 1891 (aged 83); Moss Vale, New South Wales
- Resting place: Bong Bong cemetery
- Spouse: Charles Throsby
- Children: 17

Elizabeth Isabella Throsby (née Broughton; 4 February 1807 – 14 January 1891) was an Australian survivor of the 1809 Boyd massacre.

Born on Norfolk Island, Throsby was two years old when she and her mother left Sydney on the Boyd, bound for England via New Zealand. During the voyage, a dispute broke out between the ship's English captain and a Māori passenger, the son of a Māori chief who was returning to his home at Whangaroa Harbour. Once there, his tribe learned of the captain's ill-treatment of him, and sought revenge by murdering and cannibalising most of the 70 passengers and crew, including Throsby's mother. Throsby and three other survivors were rescued a few weeks later by merchant and explorer Alexander Berry, who took them to Lima, Peru. Throsby remained there for 10 months. Berry then took her to Rio de Janeiro where they arrived a full two years after Betsy had been rescued. He transferred her to a whaling vessel that was bound for Sydney where she was reunited with her father.

She went on to marry in her late teenage years and raise a large family at Throsby Park south of Sydney, where she remained for the rest of her life.

== Birth and family ==
Elizabeth Broughton was born on 4 February 1807 on Norfolk Island—then a satellite penal station of New South Wales and now an external territory of Australia—as the youngest of five children to Englishman William Broughton and his common-law wife, London-born convict Ann Glossop, of Welsh descent. Born in Chatham, Kent in 1768, William travelled to New South Wales in 1787 aboard the First Fleet convict transport Charlotte, as a free servant of John White, the colony's first Surgeon-General. Upon arrival in Botany Bay, Sydney on 20 January 1788, Broughton and White commissioned a convict on the ship, Thomas Barrett, to strike each of them a medallion to commemorate the voyage. Broughton supplied Barrett with the metal and engraving tools, as well as the ship's coordinates for recording. Both medallions are regarded as the first works of Australian colonial art.

In 1792, while working as a store-keeper in Parramatta, Broughton met Glossop, who had been transported to the colony that year aboard the Pitt. They moved to Norfolk Island in 1800 when he became its acting deputy-commissary. In the wake of the Rum Rebellion of 1808, they returned to Sydney, where Broughton replaced Bligh loyalist John Palmer as commissary of New South Wales.

== Boyd massacre and rescue ==
The Boyd, a convict transport captained by John Thompson, arrived in Sydney from Ireland in August 1809, and two months later was chartered by ex-convict Simeon Lord to take seal skins to England. On the way, the Boyd was to call at New Zealand to complete the cargo with kauri spars, and also drop off several young Māori at Whangaroa Harbour, among them Te Ara, the son of a Ngāti Uru chief. Among the passengers bound for England were the emancipated Glossop and two-year-old Elizabeth, possibly to visit her siblings who had been sent there for their education. During the voyage, Thompson, fresh from England and apparently ignorant of Māori customs, treated Te Ara like a common crew member and demanded that he work his passage as a seaman. When Te Ara failed to comply either due to illness or out of a belief that, as a rangatira, such work was beneath him, he was deprived of food and flogged—common punishments meted out to British sailors at the time. This slighted his "mana" (dignity), which in Māori culture is met with the expected response of "utu" (revenge).

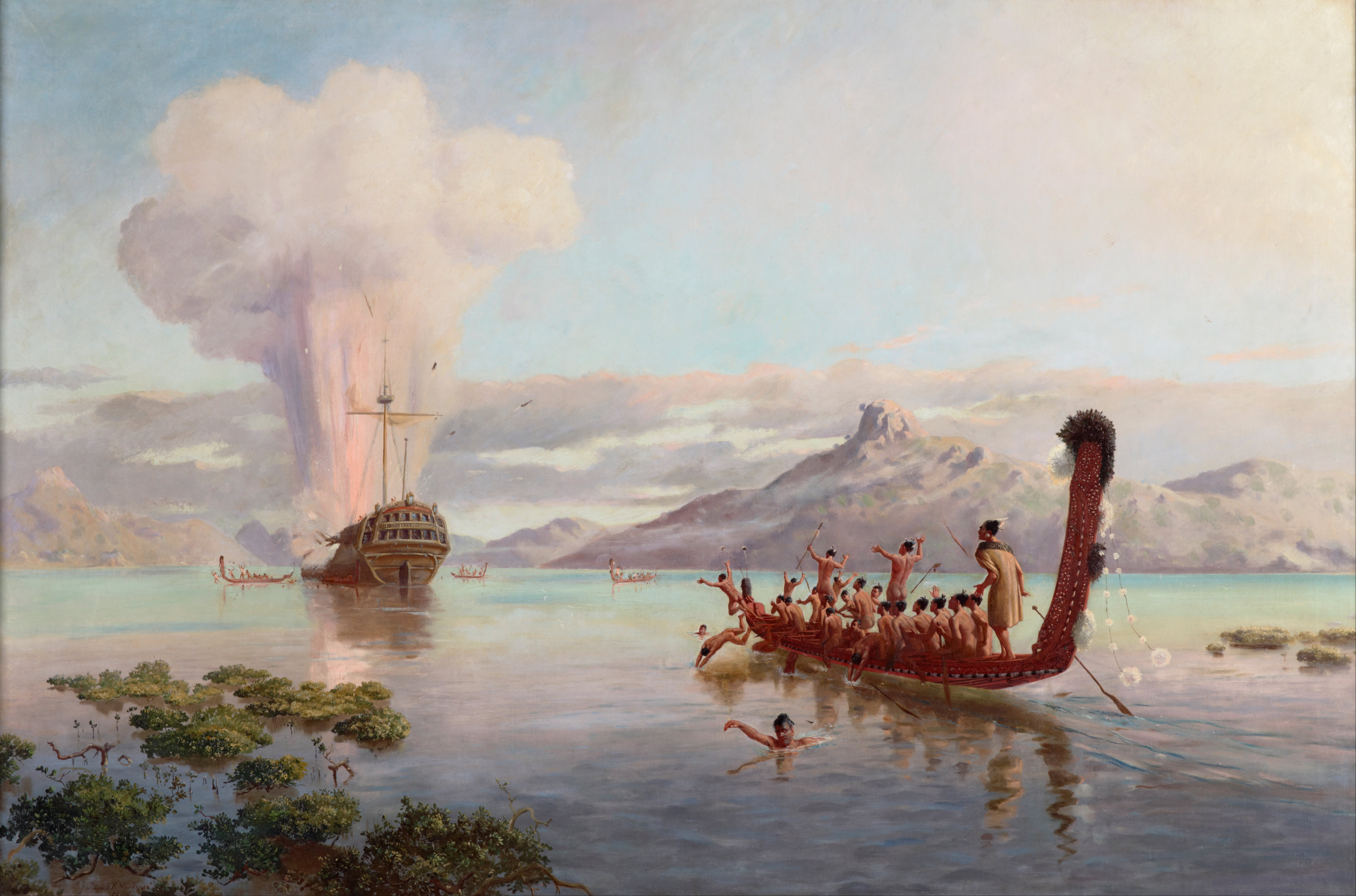
The Blowing Up of the Boyd by Louis John Steele, 1889

The Boyd reached Whangaroa in December and Te Ara's tribe soon learned of his punishment. This only deepened their desire for "utu", for they had grown suspicious of Europeans since another ship's visit in 1808 resulted in a deadly outbreak of disease among Māori, which they believed to be a curse. Oblivious to local feelings, Thompson and several crew members disembarked and went in search of kauri up the harbour, where they were murdered and cannibalised by local Māori. Then, as night fell, Māori assaulted the Boyd, murdering and later cannibalising most of the 70 remaining passengers and crew, including Glossop. Elizabeth was one of only four passengers to survive the massacre. The next day, the Boyd burnt to the water after its gunpowder magazine was accidentally ignited, causing a massive explosion that killed a number of Māori who were pillaging the ship, including Te Ara's father. The ensuing chaos triggered a civil war in Whangaroa.

Three weeks after the massacre, merchant and explorer Alexander Berry called in at the Bay of Islands on his ship the City of Edinburgh, also in quest of spars. Berry happened to have met Elizabeth as a baby and befriended her father in 1808 when he moved the family from Norfolk Island to Sydney on the City of Edinburgh. After learning of the massacre, Berry successfully procured the release of the survivors by capturing and ransoming two Māori chiefs. Elizabeth, the last survivor to be rescued, was in a Māori chief's (possibly Te Pahi's) possession and found to be "greatly emaciated", dressed only in a linen shirt and with white feathers ornamenting her hair "in the fashion of New Zealand". Although the Māori promised Elizabeth's safe delivery to Berry, they seemed reluctant to give her up, and did not bring the two-year-old to him until after a "considerable delay". When Elizabeth was carried by Berry to the ship, she began crying for her "mamma".

The City of Edinburgh left for the Cape of Good Hope, via Cape Horn, in early January 1810 with Elizabeth and the three other survivors as passengers. In February, the ship lost her sails and rudder in a storm, then drifted about the southern ice and near Tierra del Fuego until she limped into the Chilean port of Valparaíso in May. After receiving repairs, the ship reached Lima, Peru in August, where for almost a year Elizabeth lived at the home of a Spanish family while Berry recovered financially from the perilous voyage. The Spaniards grew attached to Elizabeth and made many requests to keep her, but Berry felt duty-bound to return her to Broughton. They set sail for Rio de Janeiro late in 1811; by then, Elizabeth only spoke Spanish, and did not speak English again for some time. In Rio de Janeiro, Berry found a South Seas whaler, the Atlanta, on the eve of sailing for Port Jackson. The whaler's captain volunteered to take Elizabeth home, and on 19 March 1812, she was reunited with her father in Sydney.

== Richard Read portrait ==
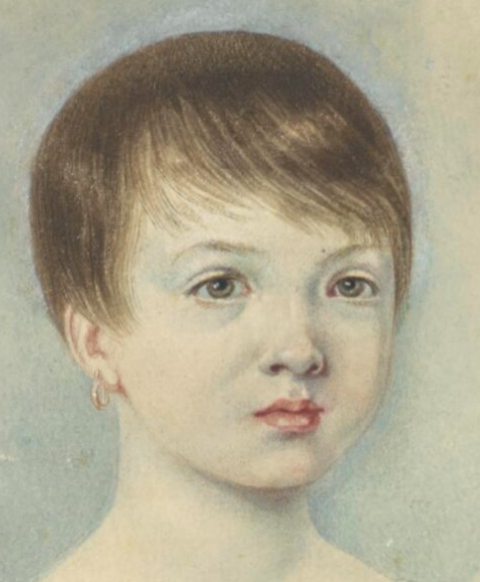
Detail of the portrait

William Broughton had Richard Read paint a portrait of Elizabeth as a gift for the family who had cared for her in Lima. Read was an English-born artist who was transported as a convict to New South Wales for 14 years for possessing forged banknotes. Within two months of his arrival in Sydney in October 1813, he was granted a ticket of leave, and went on to establish Australia's first drawing school, in Pitt Street, in 1814, the year he painted Elizabeth's portrait. It is regarded as one of the earliest such commissions in the colony and is one of the earliest extant portraits of an Australian-born European.

The portrait was rediscovered in England in the early 1950s by art collector Rex Nan Kivell, who found inside the back of the frame a letter from Broughton to Elizabeth's adopted family in Lima, thanking them for "nobly distinguishing themselves by their humanity in their protection and benevolent treatment of the child". Kivell gifted both Read's painting and Broughton's letter to the National Library of Australia.

== Later life ==
Back in Australia, Elizabeth grew up on Lachlan Vale in Appin, south of Sydney, Broughton having received the first land grant in the area in 1811. Also during Elizabeth's absence, and after the death of Glossop, Broughton married and had children with widow Elizabeth Charlotte. In 1814, the murder of a Gandangara boy by a soldier on Lachlan Vale triggered a series of reprisals that culminated in a massacre of at least 14 Aboriginal Australians on and around Broughton's land. Broughton subsequently drew the ire of colonists who sought peaceful race relations in the area, including Charles Throsby, a vocal champion of Aboriginal people since meeting them while exploring the Southern Tablelands. The Broughtons and Throsbys reconciled in 1824 when Elizabeth, aged 17, married Charles Throsby's nephew, also named Charles Throsby. Elizabeth moved to Moss Vale to live with her husband at Throsby Park, granted to Charles Throsby after his retirement as surgeon of the Coal River penal colony. Throsby Jr. took over the management of the estate after the death of his uncle in 1828.

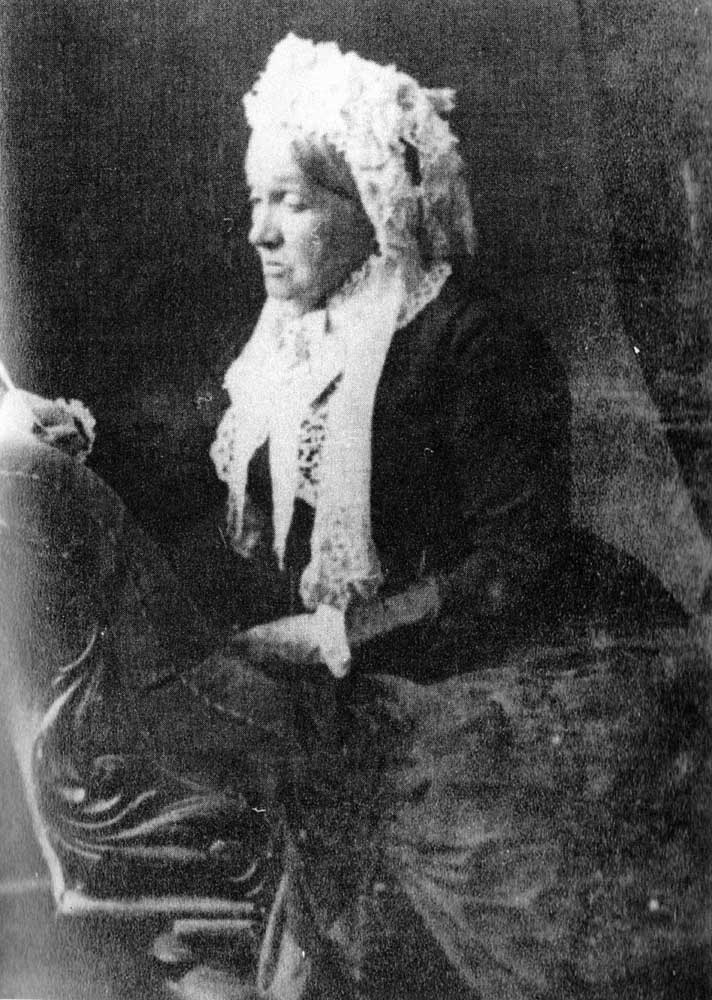
Throsby in her later years

The Throsbys became successful farmers and bore a large family of seventeen children. In 1836, they completed the original Throsby Park homestead, now listed on the New South Wales State Heritage Register. In 1839, Alexander Berry visited Throsby Park to see Elizabeth and her children. He wrote, "I may be almost considered as the constructive grandfather of the little imps". Berry also witnessed Elizabeth answering the "cruel but interesting" question if she remembered the death of her mother:

Her counternance, ... assumed the appearance of the deepest melancholy; and, without uttering a word, she used to draw her hand across her throat. On further questions, she would say, with every appearance of the most painful feeling, that [the Māori] afterwards cut her up, and cooked and ate her like victuals.

The Throsbys managed to weather the depression of the 1840s, and in 1845, Throsby Jr. funded the construction of Christ Church in Bong Bong, near Moss Vale. They also suffered a number of personal tragedies during this period with three children dying in quick succession. Charles Throsby Jr. died in 1854, making Elizabeth a widow at the age of 47. Her two eldest sons died in 1859 and 1860, and by 1866, only twelve of her children were still alive. Around this time she decided to lease Throsby Park to, among others, the Earl of Belmore, Governor of New South Wales, whose residence in the area saw it flourish as a popular holiday spot.

Being very pious, Elizabeth cherished and regularly attended the church built at the behest of her late husband, and in 1884 she paid for renovations of its interior. After a few months of ill-health, Elizabeth died at Throsby Park on 14 January 1891, aged 83, and was buried in the cemetery next to the church. Her funeral service had fifty vehicles in the cortege and was conducted by three clergymen with mourners from throughout New South Wales in attendance. One obituary remembered her as "a very active woman and until a very recent date always enjoyed her daily drives in and around Moss Vale". She is the only survivor of the Boyd massacre known to have living descendants.
