= Cecil Hoskins Nature Reserve =

Protected area in New South Wales, Australia

- IUCN category IV (habitat/species management area)
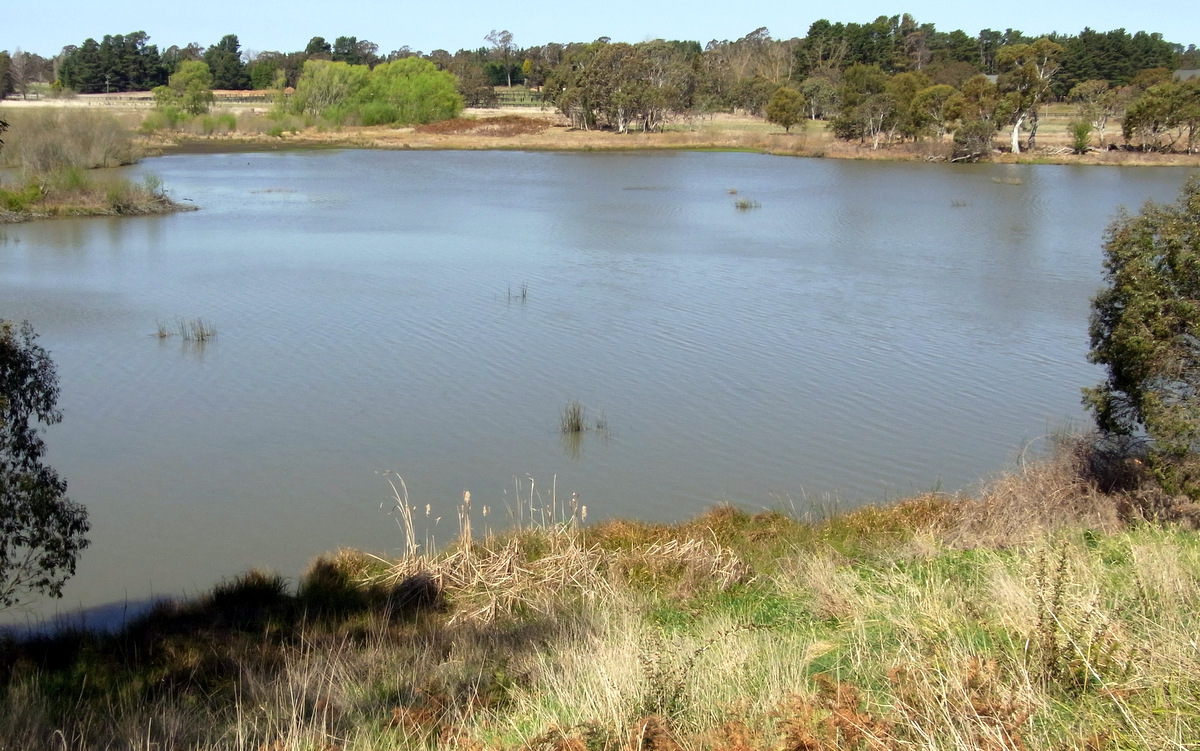
- A swamp and wetlands are located within the reserve

- Location within New South Wales
- Location: New South Wales
- Nearest city: Bowral
- Coordinates: 34°31.942′S 150°23.887′E
- Area: 0.46 km^{2} (0.18 sq mi)
- Established: 7 March 1975
- Governing body: NSW National Parks & Wildlife Service
- Website: http://www.environment.nsw.gov.au/NationalParks/parkHome.aspx?id=N0498

The Cecil Hoskins Nature Reserve is a protected nature reserve located in the Southern Highlands area of New South Wales, Australia. The 46-hectare (110-acre) reserve is situated between the towns of Bowral and Moss Vale and is known for bird watching.

== Description ==
The nature reserve is a mostly cleared area with a dammed section of the Wingecarribee River. Much of the area was cleared in the 1820s by Charles Throsby. The Throsby Park Historic Site is located near the reserve. There is some remnant bushland with the rare Camden woollybutt and some of the best stands of snow gums in the southern Highlands. Recent plantings have increased the area of natural bushland.

Barbecue, picnic facilities and public toilets are present. The area is more of a cultural reserve than preserved natural bushland.

== Etymology ==
Cecil Hoskins had been a resident at Exeter and Moss Vale and had a keen interest in gardens. He had a profound knowledge of trees and shrubs in particular and his advice on parks and gardens was sought by many. As well as his extensive home gardens at Invergowrie Exeter and later at Cardrona Moss Vale, there is much evidence of his keen interest in creating parks and gardens. For example, he planned the unique garden setting for the Portland Cement Works at Berrima, he was responsible for the planning and development of Seymour Park in Moss Vale and was Chairman of the Berrima District Committee of the Remembrance Driveway.

== Fauna ==
Foxes cause considerable damage to the local wildlife. They have been targeted by shooting, poisoning and trapping. The platypus, water rat and eastern grey kangaroo are recorded here.

The bird life of the area is of interest. At least 90 species of birds have been recorded. Cecil Hoskins Nature Reserve is an important resting and feeding place for many migratory species, particularly waterbirds. During drought, many inland birds find refuge here. Noteworthy sightings recorded here include the blue-billed duck and the rare Australasian bittern.

== Gallery ==
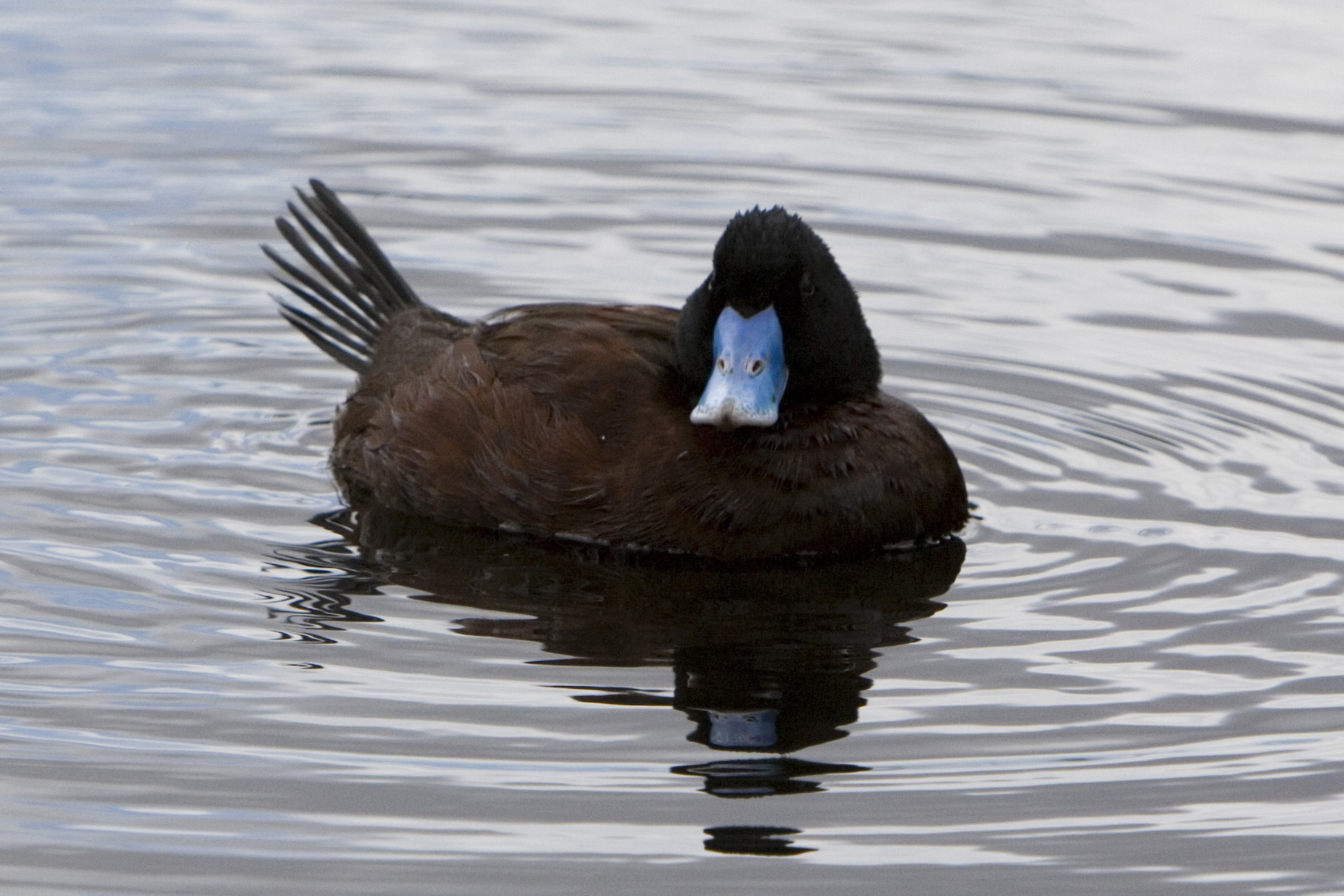
Blue-billed duck

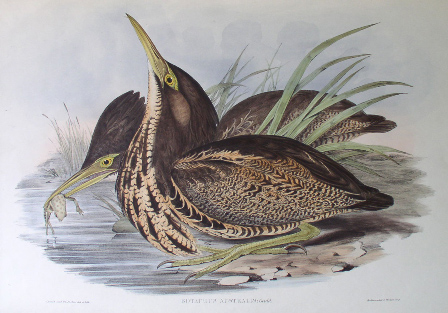
Australasian bittern

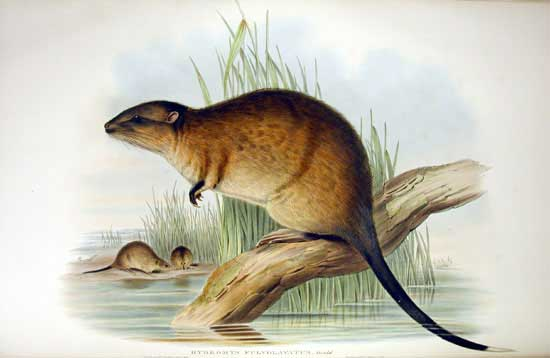
Australian water rat

== See also ==
- Protected areas of New South Wales
