= Throsby Park =

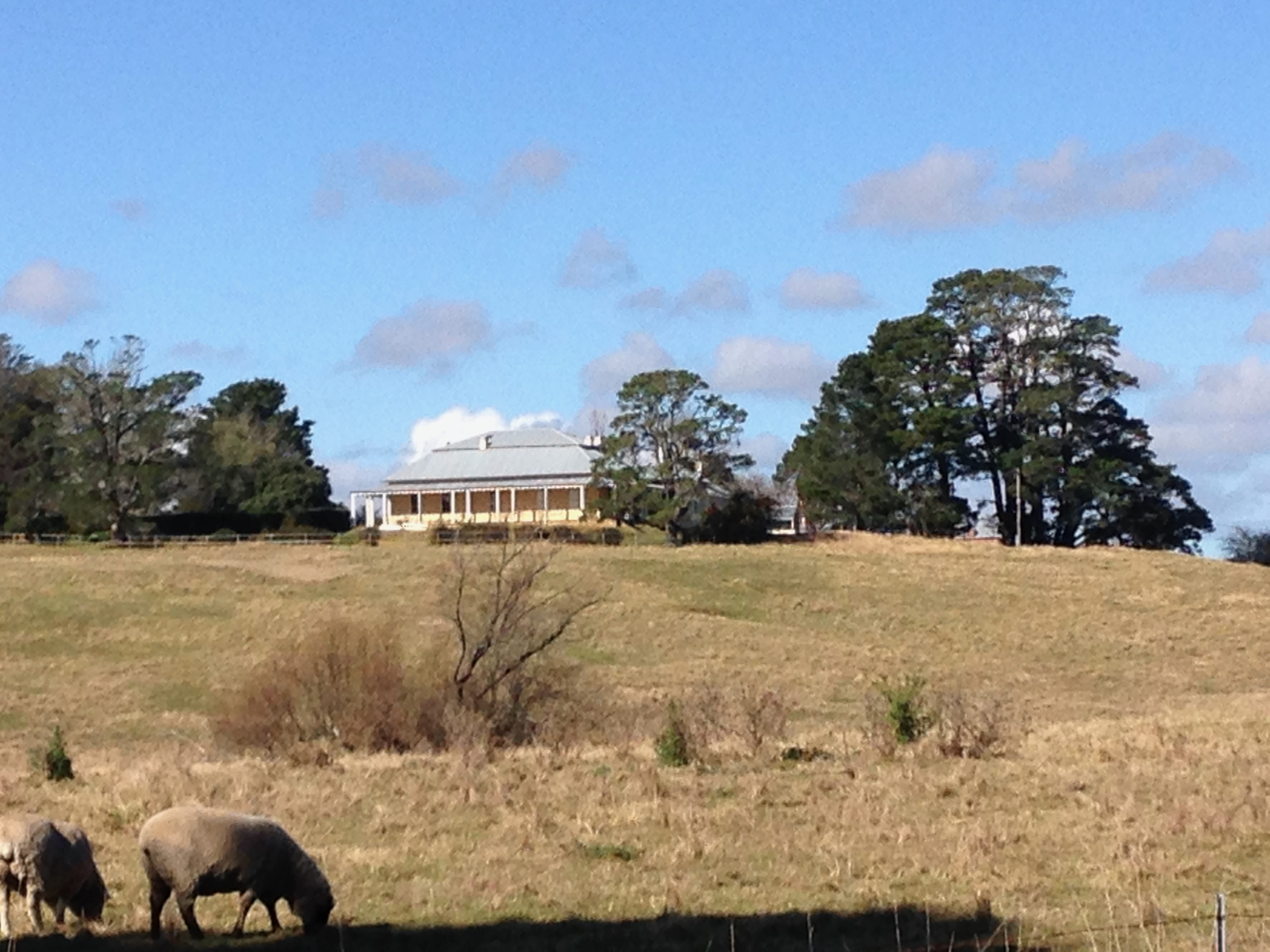
- Throsby Park in May 2021

- Location within New South Wales Location within Australia
- 34.5516°S 150.3948°E
- Location: Church Road, Moss Vale, Wingecarribee Shire, New South Wales, Australia

History
- Built: 1820–1836

Site notes
- Owner: Historic Houses Trust of NSW

New South Wales Heritage Register
- Official name: Throsby Park Historic Site
- Type: state heritage (landscape)
- Designated: 2 April 1999
- Reference no.: 1008
- Type: Farm
- Category: Farming and Grazing

Throsby Park is a heritage-listed homestead at Church Road, Moss Vale, Wingecarribee Shire, New South Wales, Australia. It was built from 1820 to 1836. The property is owned by the Historic Houses Trust of New South Wales, but is leased to banker Tim Throsby of Barclays, a descendant of the original owners. It was added to the New South Wales State Heritage Register on 2 April 1999.

== History ==
In 1819, retired Naval Surgeon Dr Charles Throsby was granted 1000 acres by Governor Macquarie in appreciation of his services to the colony. Macquarie stated that Throsby was to select the 1000 acres in any part of the area Throsby had discovered. Dr Throsby's services to the colony included involvement in the exploration of routes down the Illawarra Escarpment, from Sutton Forest to Jervis Bay and from the Cowpastures to Bathurst. This exploration was undertaken by himself, Hamilton Hume, James Meehan the surveyor, and Joseph Wild, through Camden, Bargo, Marulan and the Kangaroo Valley. Dr Throsby later explored with Wild the route through Bong Bong and Wingecarribee and Wollondilly and this is part of the site where he chose to settle.

His glowing reports of the Southern Tablelands had prompted Macquarie to open up the area placing Throsby in charge of the building of the 75 mile long road from Picton to the Wingecarribee River, west to the Wollondilly River over the Cook Bundanoon Mountains to Tarlo.

During a tour of inspection, Macquarie gave the name Throsby Park to the property that Throsby had selected. By 1820, a hut had been constructed on the property and by 1823 Throsby's nephew, also named Charles had erected a small cottage on the property. The nephew managed the property during Throsby's absences. The cottage is reported to have been used as a court when Throsby was required to act as Magistrate.

Dr Throsby was appointed to the New South Wales Legislative Council in 1825 and served on it for three years. In 1825 Governor Darling visited the property. By 1828 Dr Charles Throsby was named on a list of the 12 largest stockholders in the country. Throsby also built Glenfield Farm at Casula. Throsby continued to add to the Throsby Park property by both grant and purchase. At the time of his death, by suicide, in 1828 he held 21,600 acres (8,770 hectares). His estate including Glenfield and Throsby Park was left to his nephew Charles Throsby. His nephew Charles Throsby married Elizabeth (Betsy) Broughton in 1824.

Dr Throsby died in 1828 following a bout of severe depression. His nephew Charles inherited the estate and continued to make improvements, expanding both the property holdings and associated infrastructure. In 1828, the property had a small house, large barn and other outhouses. The number of employees grew steadily from 30, mainly assigned servants including labourers, stockmen, shepherds, watchman, hutkeepers, overseer, ploughman, gardener, fencer and shoemaker, to 50 workers in 1841.

The 1830s were a time of great pastoral opportunities in NSW, particularly for pastoralists. Throsby took advantage of these opportunities and became a major producer of food for the colony, supplying by tender much of his produce of beef, mutton, maize, flour, straw, bran and spirits. to road parties and the mounted police. Throsby moved much of his pastoral operation to the Monaro and Deniliquin areas in 1837. Throsby Park was in the ideal position to supply these properties, which Throsby did by bullock and dray.

Construction of Throsby Park House by (the nephew) Charles and Elizabeth Throsby began around 1833 and was completed by 1836 when James Backhouse described the house as a "noble mansion" during his visit.

By 1842 Charles Throsby was one of the largest shareholders in the Bank of Australia and continued to make improvements to Throsby Park. He was actively involved in community affairs being appointed District Warden by Governor Fitzroy in 1843, a position he held until his death in 1854. He donated the land for, and erected Christ Church Bong Bong nearby in 1845.

Charles' widow Elizabeth leased out many of the functions of the property to tenants, a situation that continued until 1891. In 1868 she moved into the cottage and leased Throsby Park house to the Governor of New South Wales, Lord Belmore as his summer residence. During 1873–74 the Anglican Bishop of Sydney, the Rt Reverend Frederic Barker used it as his summer residence. In 1874-75 H. E. Southey used the premises as a school. The history of occupation of the house is sketchy after this period except for 1882 - 1887 when Edward Ross Fairfax occupied it. The Bong Bong Picnic Race Club which formed in 1886 held its race meeting on the Throsby Estate.

Elizabeth Throsby died in 1891 leaving the property to Patrick Hill Throsby who died in 1894 leaving the property to Francis Henry Throsby. Patrick was a successful breeder and racer of horses. The Moss Vale Jockey Club formed in 1900 and held its race meetings on the Bong Bong track which was on the Throsby estate.

In 1905, the area was threatened by bushfires. Francis Throsby became concerned for the safety of the house and had the shingle roof removed and replaced by corrugated galvanised iron. He also had major alterations and additions made to the house in 1910.

A clay tennis court was built on terraced ground to the rear of Throsby Park house c. 1915-16 and became the social hub of the property up until World War II. It was modified some time in the 1940s-70s to become a horse exercise yard, which included installation of timber post-and-rail fencing.

Francis and his wife Jeannie settled Throsby Park House and the surrounding 181 acres on their son Francis Henry Osborne Throsby in 1930, but they continued to occupy the house until 1938.

Francis Henry Osborne Throsby and his wife Joan had been occupying the Mill where they had operated a guesthouse prior to their move to Throsby Park House in 1938. They transferred the operation of the guesthouse as well as a riding school to Throsby Park. During World War II, Throsby Park was home to a number of families whose men were either away at the war or working in Sydney. The riding school continued operating after the war with up to 35 children in residence during school holidays. Share farmers still operated on the property at various times.

Various alterations and additions continued to be made to the property and its associated infrastructure. Francis Henry Osborne Throsby died in 1960. In 1963 Delicia and Joan Hester Throsby purchased Throsby Park house. The Government of New South Wales under Premier Tom Lewis acquired the house in 1975 under the NSW National Parks and Wildlife Service (NPWS) Act, but Joan and Delicia continued to occupy the rear section of the house. A condition of acquisition was that Delicia be entitled to reside in part of the house and continue to operate her renowned riding school on the site. Joan Throsby died in 1977. Throsby Cottage was purchased by the NSW National Parks and Wildlife Service in 1991.

The house was in a dilapidated state before the NSW NPWS began conservation works. Under NSW NPWS management from the 1970s it was opened to the public on an occasional basis, with guided tours, open days and special events.

Several buildings formed part of the original property are now privately owned. These include the Mill, Barn and original stables.

The barn at Throsby Park was built by Dr. Charles Throsby soon after he had taken possession of the land and built a small wooden cottage by the 1820s. It is of brick construction set on sandstone foundation with 60 centimetre thick walls. The roof was originally shingled but now covered with corrugated iron. The barn was one of two buildings erected soon after Dr Throsby took possession of his land grant. The property has a Wingecarribee Local Government Heritage Listing as well as being included as an item of significance within the Throsby Park group.

In 2010 the property was transferred to the Historic Houses Trust (HHT) of NSW to use its expertise to build on the restoration works undertaken by the NPWS. By returning Throsby Park to its original use as a residence, HHT was to maintain its heritage values while ensuring regular opportunities for the public to visit and appreciate the property.

Between 2010 and 2013, the HHT undertook essential conservation and maintenance projects to repair damage to the building. A major task was repairing the 26 verandah columns' lower decayed sections - cut off and replaced with brick and render base "plates". Spliced in sections of recycled hardwood (ironbark, tallowwood) replacing rotten sections only. A fibro room added under a corner of the internal verandah was dismantled, its missing shaped support posts replaced in recycled hardwood, A wooden trapdoor discovered in this room cut into the flagstone floor was the old entrance to the cellar. The hinged door was in good condition but its frame decayed. A new support frame was inserted, carefully modelled on the original and a damp-proof course added between the two surfaces. Inside the house's main rooms some minor patch repairs, painting and cleaning was done. The current planned works, including painting most of the exterior, was completed in February 2013. The HHT then sought a new tenant under the Endangered Houses Program.

In April 2014 a forty-year lease over the 74 ha estate was granted to descendant, expatriate banker, Tim Throsby. One of twelve submissions for the leasehold, Throsby won not only because of family connection, but based on a $2.5m investment in conserving the house itself and a remaining $1.3m in annual rental over 40 years. Throsby's father Pat was related to Del Throsby (the last family member to live there, until her death in 2006) and had lived at the property when he was young. 'There's nothing economically sensible about all this. It's a labour of love on our part' Throsby told the Sun-Herald. 'The plan for us now is to spend some time turning it into a comfortable family home and we'll move back here in a few years to live in it'.

The lease decision in April over the 74 hectare estate with its own Act of Parliamentmakes it the largest and one of the most significant historic properties to be entrusted to a member of the public, Historic Houses Trust of NSW chair Michael Rose said. 'This is a real success in terms of taking a state-owned property, which was not in great condition and not being used, and bringing it back to life and conserving it in a way that won't cost the state', Rose said. The adjoining property, called Barnham Stables, predates Throsby Park and was where workers lived while the homestead was being built. Throsby purchased that 8396 square metre property in 2007 for $1.425m from artist John Olsen and his wife, Katherine.

== Description ==
Throsby Park is located about 140 km south of Sydney, about 2 km east of Moss Vale Railway Station. The site contains 74 hectares of the original 1000 acres grant made to Dr Charles Throsby in 1819.

The historic site consists of 43 elements: the main house, a drainage ditch, a site of convict huts, a dump, truck and fence posts, horse dray, stock loading ramp, piggery and boiling down vat, dams, roadways, horse yards, stables, gardens, stable yards, dairy, hayshed, dairyman's cottage, meat house, latrine block site, windbreak, sheep dip, the Throsby grave, the Throsby quarry, fencing, a site of various former structures, the site of the horse mill, drainage channel, orchard paddock, dairy shed, machinery shed site, groom's outhouse, kennel shed, site of grave, harvester and farm equipment, cottage and garden, collection and cottage laundry. The grounds also include a summer house and orchards.

Several buildings which originally formed part of the property are now privately owned. These include the Mill, Barn and original stables.

Fabrics include local stone, weatherboard, corrugated iron and sandstock bricks.

Throsby Park House is a one-story structure with cellars and attics, built of locally quarried stone, internally divided by brick walls with cedar joinery throughout and an iron roof.

Throsby Cottage is a timber framed weatherboard cottage. It has four wings with brick chimneys and corrugated iron hipped roofs on three wings and a gable roof on the fourth.

The laundry is a timber framed weatherboard clad building with a corrugated iron roof.

The stables have sandstock brick masonry in Flemish bond with an attic in the roof space lit by a pair of dormer windows. The corrugated iron roof is hipped, the walls are lime washed and the floors are stone flagged.

The horse yards are post and rail.

The collection consists of furniture and pictures, some originally purchased by or made for the Throsbys' and others purchased or donated to the collection.

The buildings were reported to be in good condition as a result of recent conservation works as at 14 December 2000. Prior to this, the buildings were all in a dilapidated condition. Archaeological potential is high.

Integrity and intactness are high. The majority of structures retain their original fabric and form which allows their function and interrelationship between the various building and farm components to be easily established.

=== Modifications and dates ===
- Infrastructures have been modified as needed during the entire history of the complex. The hay shed was replicated in 1991 after the original collapsed.
- Outlying former parts of the estate, the Barn and Stables were owned by Miss Rachel Roxburgh, who adaptively reused the Barn to become her home, and used the Stables to house her kiln (she was a potter, as well as an acclaimed historian and writer on colonial architecture in NSW). Miss Roxburgh died in 1991.

== Heritage listing ==
Throsby Park Historic Site is of national significance. The Throsby Park grant is important because it set in motion the first settlement outside the County of Cumberland and the opening up of the Southern Highlands. The Throsby Park Historic Site is the 184 acres core area of the 1000 acre grant made to Dr Charles Throsby in 1819. The Throsby Park Historic Site is a rare surviving property, which exhibits a strong sense of continuity from its early colonial origins and continuous family ownership.

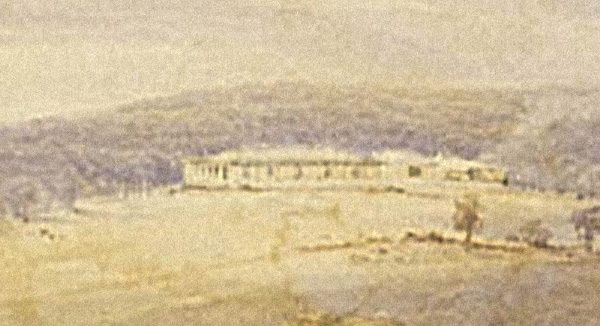
Throsby Park, painted by Conrad Martens, 1837

It is a symbol of early colonial Australia and of the lifestyle of the wealthier and more important members of colonial society. It is a rare property, that retains the ability to reflect its colonial period of use as an intense commercial mixed farming and subsistence operation that came to an end with the death of Charles Throsby in 1856. It is a substantially intact, surviving example of the cultural landscape of an intensely farmed high quality property which became the generators and breeding grounds for subsequent rural expansion and squatting empires. The farm complex which includes rare surviving 1830s farm buildings played an important role in developing the export industry for colonial beef products and in modern times has become known for its association with equestrian activities. It contains numerous archaeological deposits with potential insights into the evolution of the site and the range of colonial activities and industries carried out there. Artist Conrad Martens celebrated its qualities in a painting in 1836.

Throsby Park House, the centrepiece of the site, with a design possibly influenced by the work of John Verge, is a significant architectural milestone in the progression toward an Australian rural house form. It is a fine and early representative example of the "large verandahed cottage" which developed in the 1830s from villa and bungalow antecedents within the Old Colonial Georgian Style. Sited crowning a hill overlooking Moss Vale, the house makes a strong visual statement, with its commanding position and attendant dark pines contained within a sweeping rural landscape. Together with its collection of furniture, the house evocatively expresses the compromise between the demands of English architecture and fashion, the colonial climate and colonial building conditions and the wealth and social aspirations of its colonial builder in a way that few houses can.

The Throsby Park Historic Site has strong associations with Dr Charles Throsby who was a significant contributor to the development of the colony in his various capacities as government official, explorer, member of the first Legislative Council, pastoralist and known for his improvements to the quality of colonial cattle. His successor Charles Throsby, the person primarily responsible for the development of the property was an important figure instrumental in the development of both the property and the district. He ran an intense mixed farming business on the property that set up the family's wealth for future generations. He built Throsby Cottage, the first residence in the district, which although much altered, still stands on the property and Christ Church, Bong Bong, the first church in the district and Throsby Park House, an early "mansion" in the district.

The cultural landscape of Throsby Park is important at National, State, Regional and Local level as the surviving remnant of a 1,000 acre grant by Governor Macquarie in 1819 to Dr.Charles Throsby for his pioneering exploration for a route to the south coast from Bong Bong. Inherited by Charles Throsby, nephew of Dr. Charles Throsby, in 1834, the predominantly early nineteenth century farming landscape is articulated by a range of buildings comprising the oldest homestead complex outside the County of Cumberland. The landscape is articulated by a range of buildings, early plantings and archaeological sites which illustrate the social and rural processes of settlement and the continuity of land use and circulation patterns. The "Cottage", built by 1823 as the first residence, remained in use after the main house, was completed in 1834 as the residence of Charles and Elizabeth Throsby. The main house is an excellent example of bungalow style homestead with a courtyard which is rare in New South Wales and demonstrates the needs of a large rural family. The associated stables building is an important example of early Victorian colonial design which remains in use as part of the riding school established in 1934 by the Throsby family. The property includes an important collection of colonial furniture purchased or donated in recent times as well as pieces associated with the Throsby family. In addition the property has been associated with significant nineteenth century figures including the Earl of Belmore, Bishop Barker and members of the Fairfax family. The complex is rare in having retained a close association with the Throsby family into the 1990s.

Throsby Park was listed on the New South Wales State Heritage Register on 2 April 1999 having satisfied the following criteria.

The place is important in demonstrating the course, or pattern, of cultural or natural history in New South Wales.

Throsby Park Historic Site has a strong and ongoing association with the Throsby family, initially with explorer and original grantee, Dr Charles Throsby and with his nephew Charles Throsby who did much to develop the property and establish the family fortune.

Dr Charles Throsby was an important colonial figure who became a wealthy property owner, pastoralist, breeder of quality stock and he was one of the three private citizens selected as members of the first Legislative Council in NSW. His explorations did much to open up overland access to the Illawarra District and the Southern Highlands of New South Wales and was rewarded for his efforts by the opportunity to select 1000 acres anywhere in the area he had discovered. Charles and Elizabeth Throsby were largely responsible for the development of the property. He was a successful farmer and pastoralist who was a very successful tenderer to many of the road gangs and mounted police. Charles was responsible for the construction of Christ Church, Bong Bong, acted as the local Magistrate and became the first District Warden for Berrima District. He was a prominent member in his community, as were his descendants. Elizabeth Throsby was involved in a shipping disaster and immortalised as a child in a c.1814 painting now held in the National Gallery Canberra.

Prominent visitors to the property include explorer James Backhouse as well as Governors Macquarie (who granted and named the property), Darling, and Fitzroy as well as Governor, Lord Belmont who leased the property as his summer residence. Conrad Martens painted the property in 1836.

The place is important in demonstrating aesthetic characteristics and/or a high degree of creative or technical achievement in New South Wales.

The aesthetic significance of Throsby Park Historic Site is high. The homestead is set in cultivated gardens on a hill with vast open vistas over the sweeping rural landscape. The associated outbuildings, separated from the homestead in their own precinct add to the historic context of the site. When viewed as a whole, the homestead and its associated outbuildings, its natural setting and landforms with cultivated gardens and pastures is evocative of its early 19th century origins and appearance.

Possibly the work of John Verge, Throsby Park House is a significant architectural milestone in a progression towards an Australian rural residential form which was a combination of the country house, villa and cottage forms. It is a compromise between English architectural fashion, the climate, available building resources and the wealth and social aspirations of the Throsby family.

The place has strong or special association with a particular community or cultural group in New South Wales for social, cultural or spiritual reasons.

Throsby Park Historic Site is of state significance as the first property developed outside the County of Cumberland and is an important milestone in opening up the Southern Highlands and the Berrima District.

The property is of regional significance because of its association with the development of the Moss Vale district, in particular the establishment of Bong Bong and Berrima. It is also linked to the construction of Christ Church and the Royal Oak Inn at Bong Bong, as well as to the establishment of Bong Bong Picnic Race Club and the Moss Vale Jockey Club.

It is also of ongoing significance to the descendants of the Throsby family.

The place has potential to yield information that will contribute to an understanding of the cultural or natural history of New South Wales.

Throsby Park Historic Site contains numerous archaeological deposits, standing structures and features, which have the potential to provide insights into early colonial mixed farming operations and associated subsistence activities and into the lifestyle of wealthy colonial families of the period.

The extant buildings and features have the potential to demonstrate period construction techniques and materials.

The place possesses uncommon, rare or endangered aspects of the cultural or natural history of New South Wales.

Throsby Park Historic Site is a rare example of a pastoral property which has remained in the hands of one family from its granting in 1819 until 1975 and who still maintain an ongoing association with the property. Throsby Park house is a rare rural property with surviving 1820s farm buildings, which exhibits a strong sense of continuity from its colonial origins.

Throsby Park was the first property developed outside the County of Cumberland and an important milestone in opening up the Southern Highlands and the Berrima district to settlement.

The place is important in demonstrating the principal characteristics of a class of cultural or natural places/environments in New South Wales.

Throsby Park Historic Site contains representative examples of various elements associated with architecture, colonial society, workmanship and technology. Throsby Park House is a representative example of the 1830s large verandahed cottage type which is a sub-set of the Old Colonial Georgian architectural style.

The farm buildings associated with the historic property are a fine, representative, early nineteenth century period set, although many are altered and all except the stables are now in private ownership.

Throsby Cottage is a good although much altered example of the early cottages built by wealthy settlers as a stepping stone on their way to a larger and more sophisticated residence. By its alterations it demonstrates responses to changing occupational needs.

The joinery in Throsby Park House represents an example of quality period workmanship.

The furniture collection associated with Throsby Park provenanced to the place includes representative examples of fine early pieces and some early locally made pieces.
