= The Scrutineer and Berrima District Press =

Front page of The Scrutineer, 12 January 1892

The Scrutineer and Berrima District Press was a newspaper published in Moss Vale, New South Wales, Australia from 1874 until 1949. It was also published as The Scrutineer and West Camden Advocate and The Scrutineer.

== History ==
The Scrutineer and West Camden Advocate was first published on 9 April 1874 by William Joseph McCourt. McCourt sold the newspaper in 1886 for £300.

In 1891 the newspaper shortened its name to The Scrutineer and lengthened it again in 1892 to The Scrutineer and Berrima District Press.

The Scrutineer was published by Ada Jane Hewison from 1913 until it ceased publishing in 1949.

== Digitisation ==
The paper has been digitised as part of the Australian Newspapers Digitisation Program project of the National Library of Australia.

== See also ==
- List of newspapers in Australia
- List of newspapers in New South Wales
