= Throsby (surname) =

Throsby is a surname, and may refer to:

- Charles Throsby (1777–1828), Australian explorer and parliamentarian after whom the electoral division and the suburb are named
- David Throsby (born 1939), Australian economist, sister of Margaret Throsby, uncle of Holly Throsby
- Elizabeth Throsby, Australian survivor of the 1809 Boyd massacre.
- Holly Throsby (born 1978), Australian songwriter, musician, singer, niece of David Throsby, daughter of Margaret Throsby
- John Throsby (1740–1803), English antiquary
- Margaret Throsby (born 1941), Australian radio broadcaster, sister of David Throsby, mother of Holly Throsby
