= Throsby =

Throsby may refer to:

In Australian geography:

- Division of Throsby, an Australian electoral division.
- Throsby, Australian Capital Territory, suburb of Canberra, named after Charles Throsby

People:

- Throsby (surname)
