= William Broughton (magistrate) =

English settler and public servant in New South Wales (1768–1821)

William Broughton Esq.
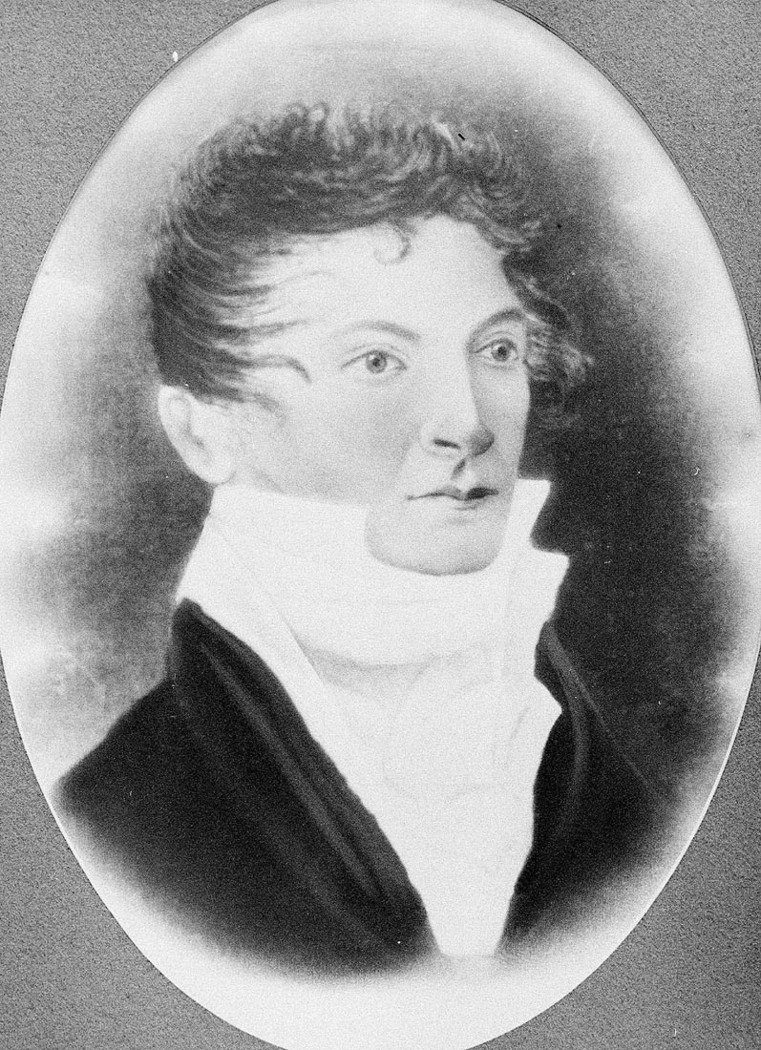
- Portrait by an unknown artist, date unknown, reproduced 1923
- Born: Chatham, Kent, England
- Baptised: November 1768
- Died: 22 July 1821 (aged 52); Appin, New South Wales
- Resting place: St Lukes, Liverpool
- Spouse: Elizabeth Charlotte (m. 1810)
- Partner: Elizabeth Heathorn (alias Ann Glossop) (1792–1807)
- Children: Five by Ann Glossop, including Elizabeth Throsby

William Broughton (1768–1821) was an English public servant and early settler in the Colony of New South Wales.

== Life ==
Broughton was baptised in November 1768 at Chatham, Kent. He arrived in the Colony of New South Wales with the First Fleet, under the auspices of Governor Arthur Phillip, as a servant to surgeon John White. He was employed under every subsequent administration, in the commissariat department of the territory and its dependencies. According to the obituary in the Sydney Gazette, in his various public duties "he afforded general satisfaction."

He formed a relationship with convict and later emancipist Ann Glossop, with whom he had five children between 1772 and 1807. Glossop died in the Boyd massacre in New Zealand. Their daughter, Betsy Broughton, was one of four survivors.

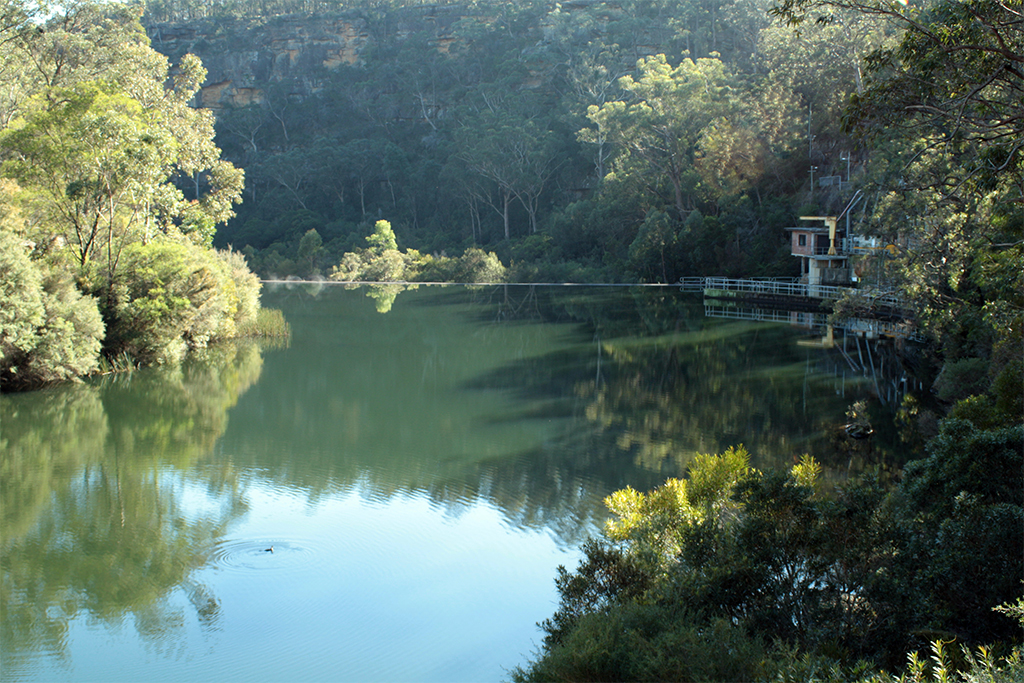
Broughton Pass Weir near Appin

Broughton married Elizabeth Charlotte Kennedy in 1810. They became the first settlers of Appin and the Cowpastures region, when in 1811 Governor Lachlan Macquarie granted him 1,000 acres (4.0 km^{2}). He named the estate Lachlan Vale.

In October 1810, Broughton's horse Jerry lost to William Charles Wentworth on D'Arcy Wentworth's horse Gig, in the first official horse races on Australian soil.

=== Death ===
At Appin, on Sunday 22 July 1821, William Broughton, Esquire, acting assistant commissary general, and a magistrate for the territory, died after a painful illness. The funeral took place on Wednesday 25 July at St. Luke's Church, Liverpool, and was attended by Governor Macquarie, and most of the civil and military officers, and prominent inhabitants of the Colony.

Macquarie praised Broughton for performing "faithful, honest, useful and ardous Service" to the colony over thirty years.

== See also ==
- Broughton, a Dharawal guide, tracker and constable, so named by Charles Throsby, probably after William Broughton.
