= Richard Read Sr. =

Australian artist in New South Wales (1765–1829)

Richard Read Sr. (c. 1765 – c. 1829) was a British-born artist who was sent to Australia as a convict. He is known as Richard Read senior to differentiate him from another Richard Read, thought to be his son, who painted in Sydney at the same time.

== Early life ==
Little is known of Richard Read's early life. Richard Read is said to have been born in London circa 1765. Recent sources suggest that his middle name was Daniel and that his parents were Richard Read and Lydia, née Ames. London business directories for 1805 and 1808 show Read as an animal painter. In July 1812 he was sentenced to fourteen years’ transportation for knowingly possessing forged banknotes. He was transported to Sydney on the Earl Spencer, arriving in Sydney on 9 October 1813. Just eight weeks later, Read received his ticket of leave. Sarah and their daughter Elizabeth Lydia arrived on the ship Kangaroo in January 1814. His son, also named Richard and later a noted painter himself, arrived in Sydney as a free settler in 1819. The younger Richard Read was already estranged from his father, and did not acknowledge their relationship.

== Career ==
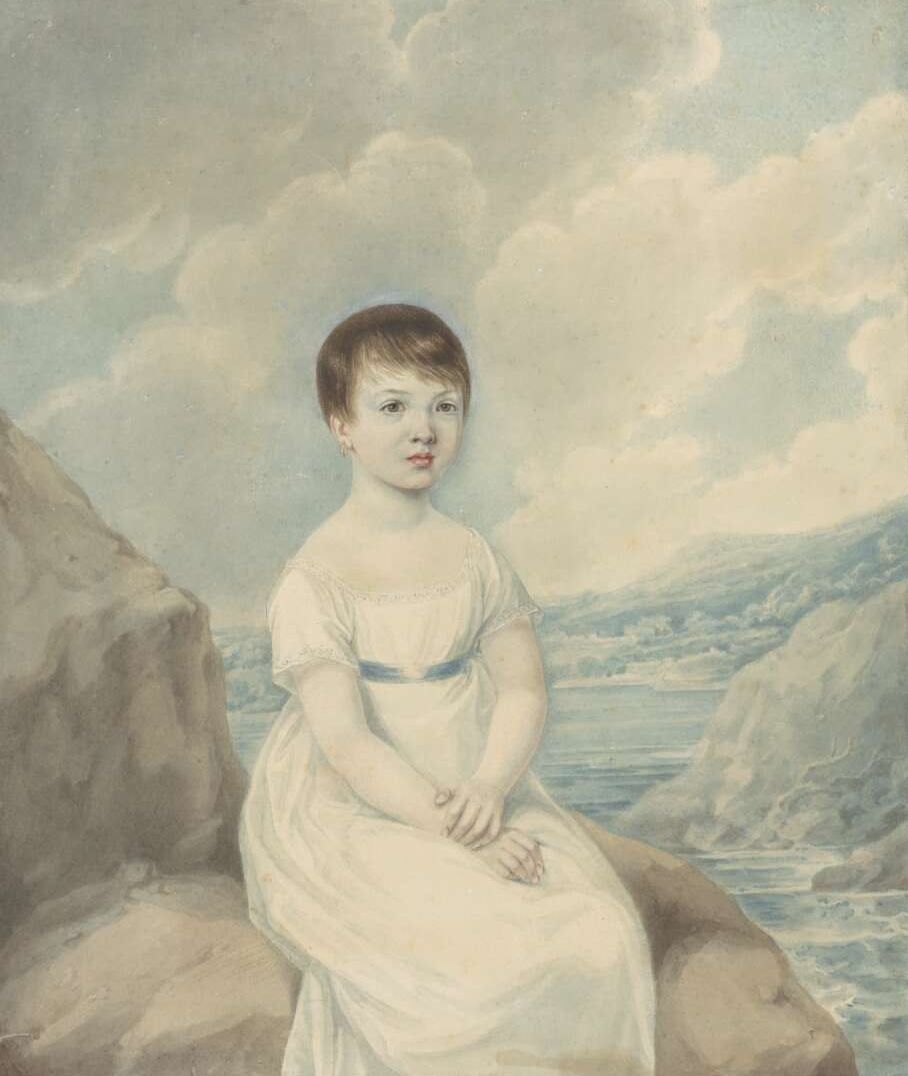
Read's portrait of Elizabeth Broughton, 1812, National Library of Australia

Read established a drawing school at 37 Pitt Street, Sydney, in 1814. There he taught the art of drawing, and also sold his own drawings, embroideries and paintings. Two Read paintings survive from this time: Portrait of John Buckland and Portrait of Elizabeth Isabella Broughton. Though Read claimed to have been taught by the noted British artist Sir Joshua Reynolds, no evidence has been found for this claim. He benefited from the patronage of New South Wales governor Lachlan Macquarie. Read advertised in the Sydney Gazette in 1823, saying that he had recently completed a number of portraits of Macquarie. A watercolour portrait of Macquarie acquired by the State Library of New South Wales is thought to be one of these. On the reverse, the portrait is labelled 'Take notice that none are original pictures of Governor Macquarie but what has got the name of Read marked in Latin with the seal annext Governor Macquarie never sat to any artist in this colony but Read Snr.'

Read continued to operate at several studios in Sydney before receiving an absolute pardon in July 1826. Shortly thereafter, no further trace is found of Read. As he is not listed in the 1828 census of new South Wales, it is possible that he returned to England.

== Legacy ==
Read painted portraits of notable Sydney identities including the Macquarie family, Barron Field and Elizabeth Marsden, wife of Samuel Marsden. These, along with several of Read's Sydney landscapes and paintings of birds and animals, are located at the State Library of New South Wales.

== See also ==
- List of convicts transported to Australia
