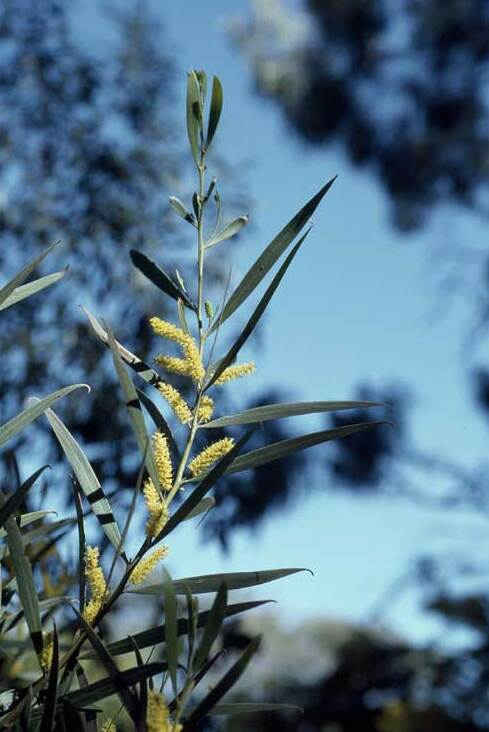
- In the Australian National Botanic Gardens

Scientific classification
- Kingdom: Plantae
- Clade: Embryophytes
- Clade: Tracheophytes
- Clade: Spermatophytes
- Clade: Angiosperms
- Clade: Eudicots
- Clade: Rosids
- Order: Fabales
- Family: Fabaceae
- Subfamily: Caesalpinioideae
- Clade: Mimosoid clade
- Genus: Acacia
- Species: A. subtilinervis

Binomial name
- Acacia subtilinervis F.Muell.
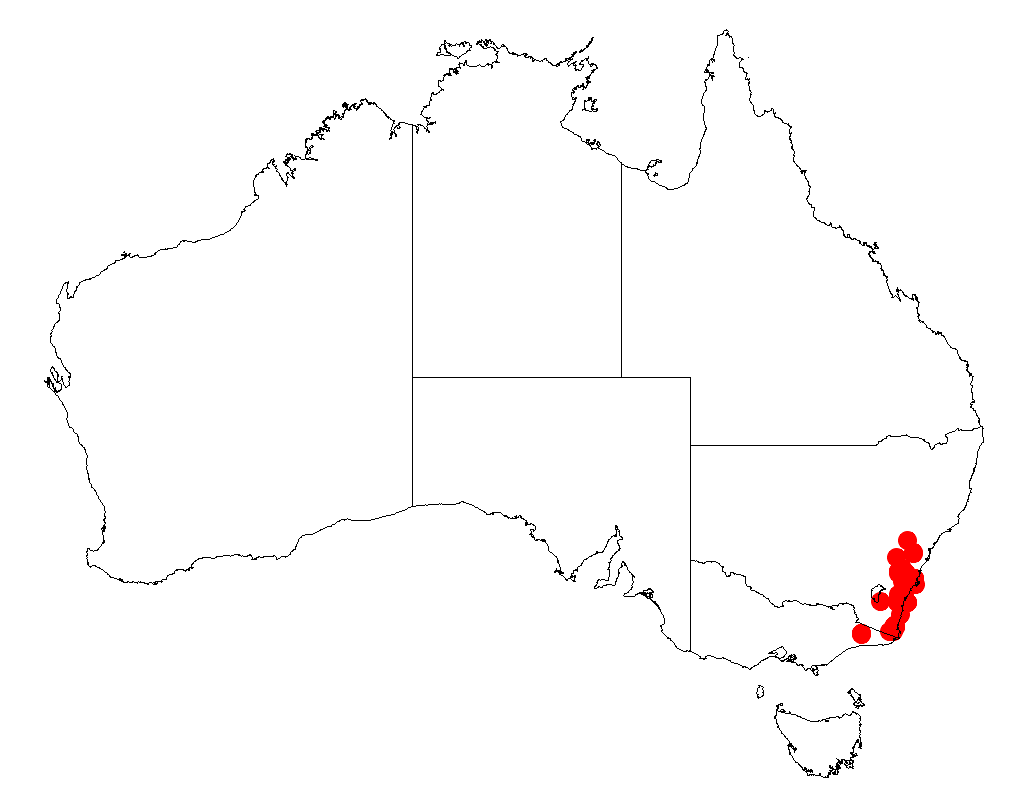
- Occurrence data from AVH

= Acacia subtilinervis =

Species of legume

Acacia subtilinervis, also known as the net-veined wattle, is a rare wattle in the Juliflorae subgenus found in eastern Australia.

== Description ==
The tree or shrub typically grows to a height of 1 to 4 m (3 ft 3 in to 13 ft 1 in) and can have a spreading or erect habit. It has grey coloured bark that can have a smooth texture or be finely fissured. The glabrous branchlets are more or less terete and resinous becoming granular toward the apices. Like most species of Acacia it has phyllodes rather than true leaves. The evergreen, leathery phyllodes have a narrowly elliptic to linear shape and are generally straight with a length of 5 to 15 cm (2.0 to 5.9 in) and a width of 6 to 15 mm (0.24 to 0.59 in). They have one prominent midvein and numerous fine longitudinal veins that are barely visible. It blooms between August and October producing inflorescences that occur singly or in pairs in the axils on stalks that are 4 to 10 mm (0.16 to 0.39 in) in length. The ovoid or cylindrical shaped flower-heads are 1 to 3 cm (0.39 to 1.18 in) in length and densely packed with bright yellow coloured flowers. The seed pods that form after flowering are straight and reasonably flat except for around the seeds where they are slightly raised and constricted. The firmly papery glabrous pods are 4 to 10 cm (1.6 to 3.9 in) in length and 3 to 4 mm (0.12 to 0.16 in) wide and either smooth or a little wrinkled. The seeds inside are arranged longitudinally. The black to brown coloured seeds have an oblong elliptic shape with a length of about 4 mm (0.16 in) with an open aureole.

== Taxonomy ==
The species was first formally described by the botanist Ferdinand von Mueller in 1863 as part of the work Fragmenta Phytographiae Australiae. It was reclassified as Racosperma subtilinerve by Leslie Pedley in 2003 then returned to genus Acacia in 2006. The specific epithet is in reference to the very fine nveins found in the phyllodes. The type specimen was collected by Ferdinand von Mueller from the hills around Mount Imlay.

== Distribution ==
It is found in New South Wales and Victoria on the ranges around the Wolgan River in the north west and along the coast near Nowra in the north east with a range that extends down into Victoria. It is often situated among rocky outcrops as a part of heathland or dry sclerophyll forest communities. In Victoria it is found as far south as the upper Snowy River in the east Gippsland area growing in sandy gravelly soils in and around granite, sandstone and rhyolite.

== See also ==
- List of Acacia species
