= Bong Bong, New South Wales =

Former locality in Australia

Coordinates: 34°32′14″S 150°23′27″E

Bong Bong was a small township in Wingecarribee Shire, New South Wales, Australia. It is also the name for the surrounding parish. It is within the Southern Highlands.

The site was chosen by Governor Lachlan Macquarie in 1820 close to the ford on the Wingecarribee River. In 1821 it was laid out and there is an obelisk on the site stating "Site of Bong Bong Military Station and First Township Reserve on the Southern Highlands - surveyed 1821".

A post office was established in 1829 which operated until 1867 when, with the combination of the realignment of the Great Southern Road (now the Hume Highway) and the railway going to the neighbouring town of Moss Vale, Bong Bong declined. All that remains now is the Church, called Christ Church. In the Christ Church cemetery is buried the Australian explorer Joseph Wild.

== Heritage listings ==
Bong Bong has a number of heritage-listed sites, including:

- Bong Bong Road: Christ Church

== Railway station ==
A railway station known as Bong Bong opened on the Main South railway line in 1878, closing in 1913.

Preceding station	Former services	Following station
Moss Vale towards Albury	Main Southern Line	Burradoo towards Sydney

== See also ==
- List of reduplicated Australian place names
