= Wingecarribee River =

River in New South Wales, Australia

Wingecarribee
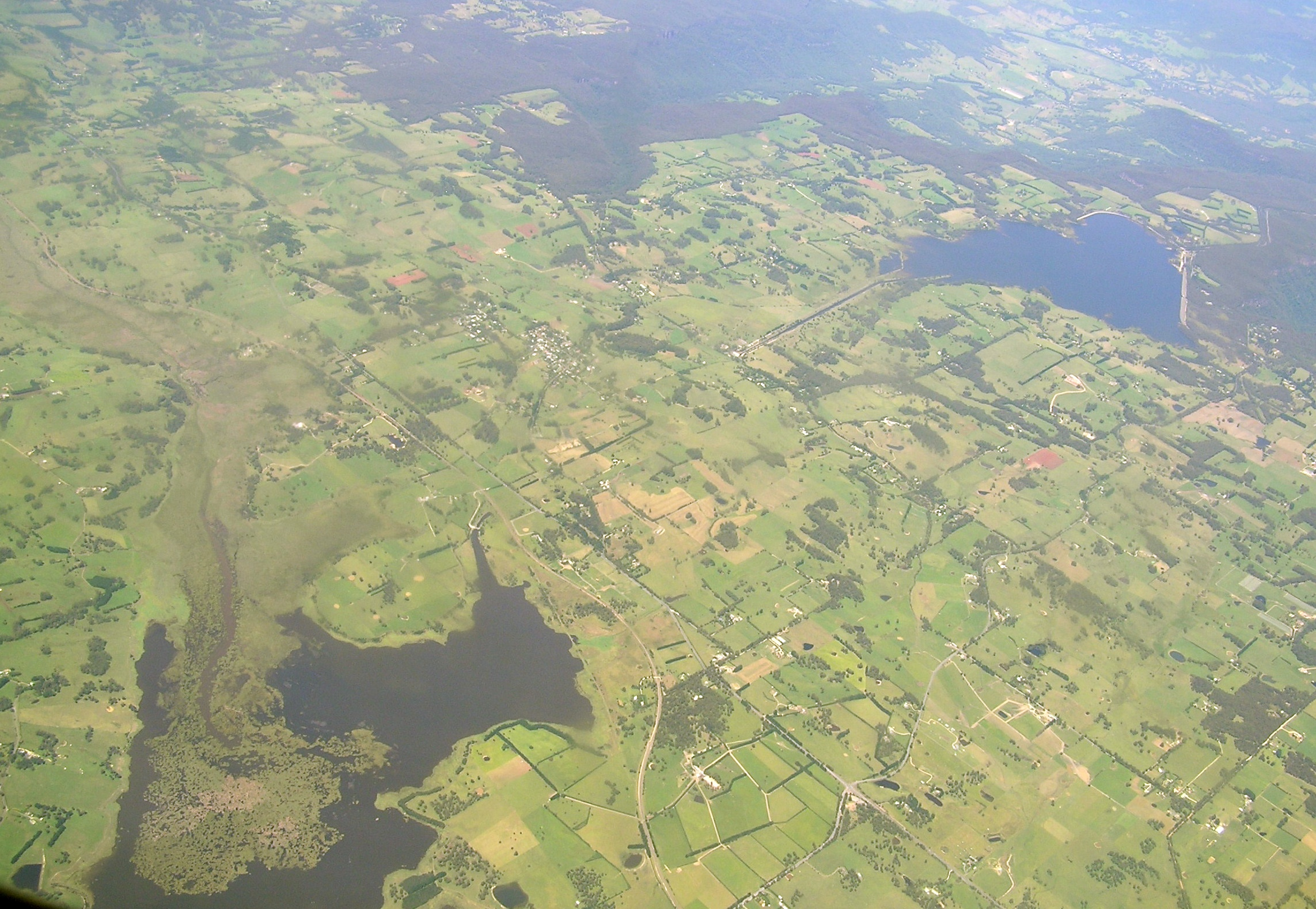
- The brown on the left is Wingecarribee Swamp with Fitzroy Falls Reservoir on the right.
- Etymology: Aboriginal (Dharawal): Winge Karrabee meaning "a flight of birds" and "waters to rest beside"
- Native name: Winge Karrabee (Dharawal)

Location
- Country: Australia
- State: New South Wales
- Region: Sydney Basin (IBRA), Southern Highlands
- Local government areas: Wingecarribee, Wollondilly
- Town: Berrima

Physical characteristics
- Source: Wingecarribee Reservoir
  - location: Glenquarry
  - coordinates: 34°34′35″S 150°32′35″E
  - elevation: 674 m (2,211 ft)
- Mouth: confluence with the Wollondilly River
  - location: Tugalong, northwest of Berrima
  - coordinates: 34°22′36″S 150°07′22″E
  - elevation: 280 m (920 ft)
- Length: 73 km (45 mi)

Basin features
- River system: Hawkesbury-Nepean catchment
- Tributaries
  - right: Joadja Creek, Deep Creek (Wingecarribee)
- National park: Bangadilly National Park

The Wingecarribee River (Aboriginal Dharawal: Winge Karrabee), a perennial river that is part of the Hawkesbury–Nepean catchment, is located in the Southern Highlands region of New South Wales, Australia.

== Course and features ==
Wingecarribee River rises on the heights at Robertson below Wingecarribee Reservoir, near the village of Glenquarry, and flows generally northwest, joined by two minor tributaries and through the Belanglo State Forest and Bangadilly National Park, before reaching its confluence with the Wollondilly River north of the locality of Tugalong, northwest of Berrima. The river descends 393 metres (1,289 ft) over its 73-kilometre (45 mi) course.

In its upper reaches, the feeder creeks of the Wingecarribee form the Wingecarribee Swamp, the only substantial peat bog in New South Wales. Most of the swamp has been drained and the remaining section of the swamp is the habitat of a number of endangered species. The river runs through a valley on the plateau that is home to a popular camp, Biloela.

The Moss Vale Road crosses the river at Bong Bong, between Bowral and Moss Vale. At Berrima, the river is crossed by the Hume Freeway.

The Shoalhaven Scheme pumps water from the Shoalhaven River into the Wingecarribee Reservoir and this water supply augments the water supply for greater metropolitan Sydney.

== See also ==
- List of rivers of New South Wales (L–Z)
- List of rivers of Australia
- Rivers of New South Wales
