= Joseph Wild =

Australian explorer (1759–1837)

- Born: 1759; Chester, England
- Died: 25 May 1837; Bong Bong, New South Wales
- Occupations: Explorer; shepherd; constable
- Known for: Exploration

Joseph Wild (1759–1837) was a British-Australian convict, explorer, shepherd, constable and conveyor. He is most recognised for his contributions to the "discovery of Canberra", Sutton Forest, Jervis Bay, Bathurst, Wildes Meadow, and the discovery of Lake George and the Molongolo River.

== Early life ==
Wild grew up in Chester, England. During Wild's time there, the city was experiencing a period of economic deterioration. Chester's traditional economy was breaking down as manufacturing industries began to move out of the area due to lacking competitive efficiency. This left many struggling to find employment in the lead up to the turn of the century, with crime rates also accelerating. It is not known what employment Joseph held at this time. Further, no information regarding his family and childhood could be collated other than the name of his brother George Wild who also travelled to Australia as a convict.

== Conviction and transportation to Australia ==
Wild was convicted of burglary at the Chester Gaol Delivery on 21 August 1793. Joseph received 50 lashes and spent several years in gaol, where he worked in service of the government. He was then sentenced to Transportation to Australia, departing on the Ganges in the early part of 1797. The Ganges is the boat that Joseph Wild and 202 other convicts were transported to Port Jackson on, captained by Thomas Patrickson. Despite Sir James Fitzpatricks request to have ventilators and water purifiers installed on the ship for improved health facilities, it is noted that 13 convicts still died on the voyage. The convicts departing on this ship came from all throughout England, and before departure, many spent an extended period of time in prison at Portsmouth, including Joseph Wild. Wild arrived in New South Wales on 2 June 1797 along with 202 other convicts from the United Kingdom. Only one other convict ship arrived in Australia in the same year as the Ganges, the Britannia, which transported a number of Irish convicts. As per his sentence, Wild became a servant to Robert Brown, a botanist from Scotland who took particular interest in Australian flora. From 1797 to 1810, Wild travelled with Brown westwards towards the Blue Mountains to briefly explore the interior of Australia. In this same period, Joseph also travelled to Tasmania with Brown and Adolarius Humphrey, a mineralogist, to Tasmania before he returned to New South Wales as Brown and Humphrey sailed back to England.

It was not until 1810 when Wild received his ticket of leave, serving an effective sentence of 13 years. In the period after his release of the confinements of his criminal charge, Wild become the superintendent of George Crossley's farm, where he managed a 423-acre plot of land at the Hawkesbury. It is also likely that Wild also worked as a labourer in the Liverpool region. It was not until 1813 when Joseph Wild received his official pardon from Governor Macquarie, initially filing the request in 1810 but having it denied at first.

== Exploration of Australia ==
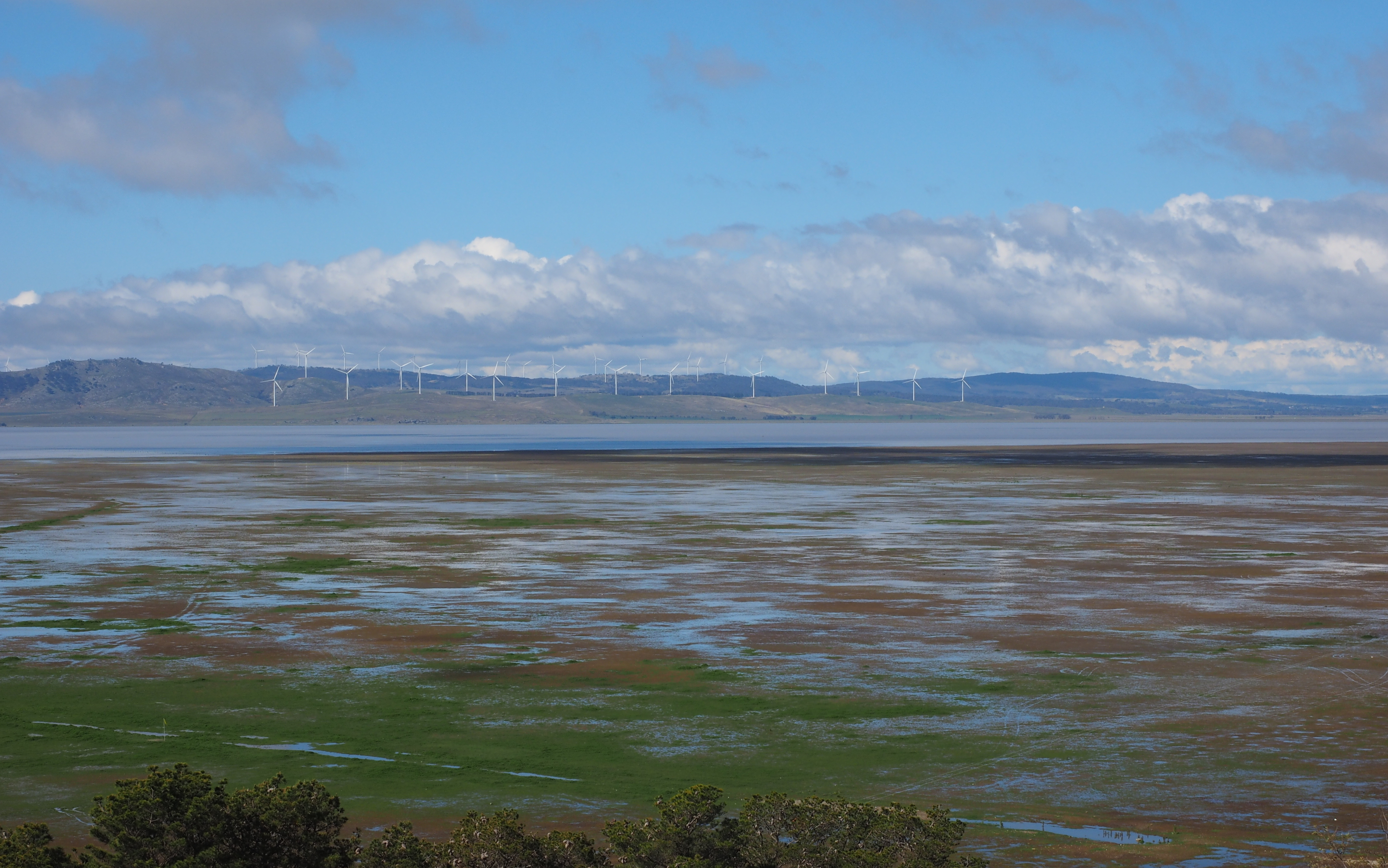
Lake George from the Weereewa Lookout (2020)

He did not truly begin his exploration of New South Wales until he crossed paths with Charles Throsby, a settler and explorer of Australia. He was employed as a shepherd by Charles Throsby and lived on a property near Bong Bong in a hut. Wild began to work for Throsby in 1814, and from this point Wild made several major discoveries. Wild explored Sutton Forest (1817), Jervis Bay (1818) and Bathurst (1819) alongside Throsby. For his service to Charles Throsby on these explorations, Wild was given 100 acres of land at Bathurst. However, Wild chose to sell this plot of land to one of his travel companions not long after receiving ownership. In the early 19th century, Wild is credited with the discovery of a Meadow now known as "Wildes Meadow."

Wild is credited with the discovery of Lake George, originally Weereewa. The lake is located near Canberra and is quite expansive, with a maximum length of 25 km and a maximum width of 10 km. Joseph came across this lake while leading an expedition at Throsby's discretion in 1820, and this discovery is probably his most notable. His expedition party likely came across the lake after passing through Geary's gap or an adjacent hill. Throsby noted in his recommendation that "though an illiterate man, [Wild] is very useful and intelligent in the woods". In March 1821, Joseph made his final expedition with Throsby in a search for the Murrumbidgee. Wild's expeditions likely came to a close around 1823, when Captain Currie, Major Ovens and Wild came to discover the Monaro Plains near Cooma.

=== Expeditions to the Canberra district ===
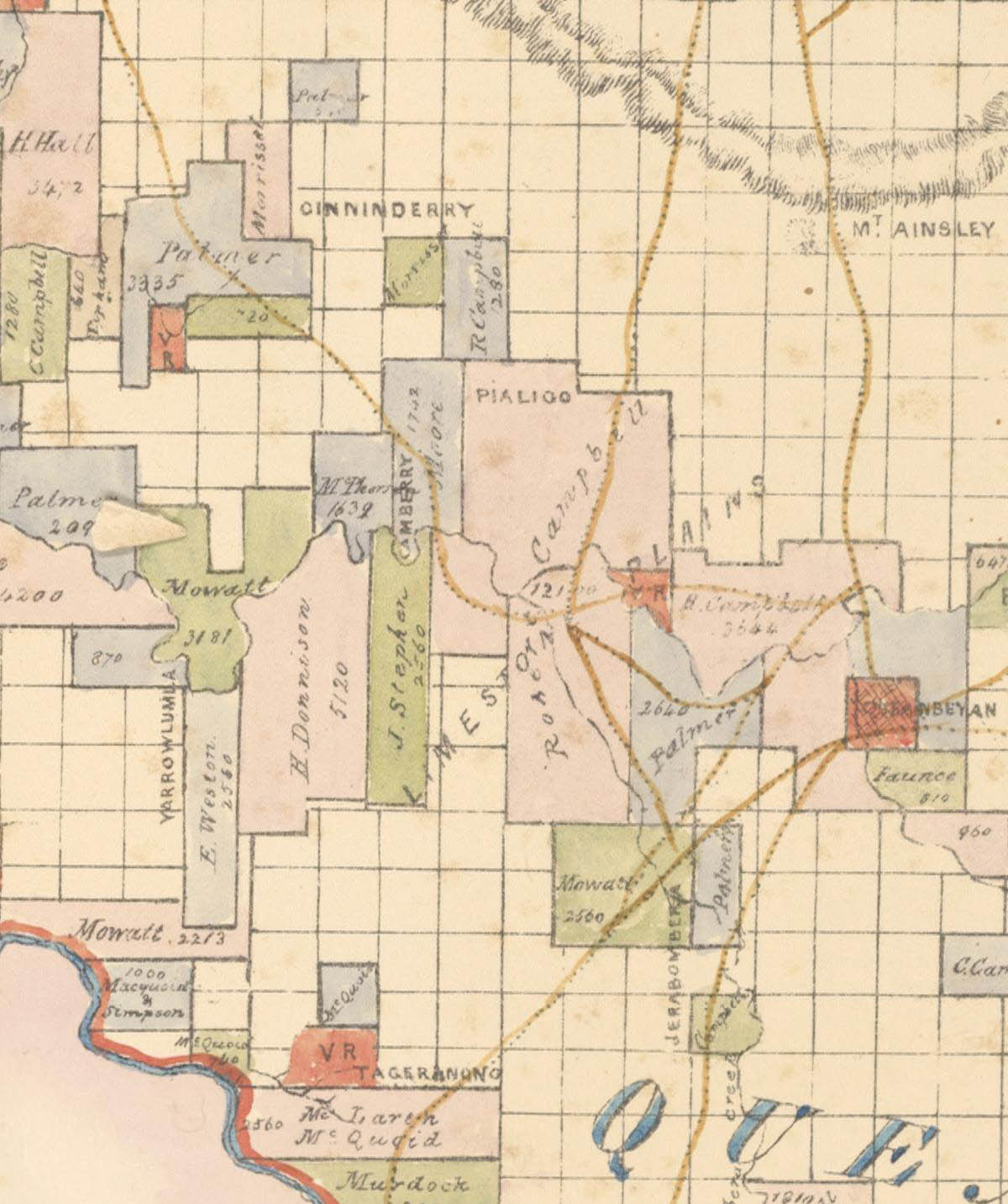
Canberra, 1843-1846

After the Lake George expedition, Wild participated in four European expeditions to the Canberra district. In late October 1820 he was part of Throsby's expedition with James Vaughan and led by two Aboriginal guides, one of whom was named Taree, that travelled from Lake Bathurst to Lake George and the Yass River. They were the first Europeans recorded to enter what is now the ACT, at either Kowan or Majura. The next was organised by Charles Throsby Smith (Throsby's nephew) and also included Vaughan and an unknown Aboriginal guide. This was the first expedition to visit the Molonglo River (early December 1820). They camped opposite what was to become the modern city's civic centre.

This river is also referred to as "Yeal-am-bid-gie," the Limestone River and the Fish River. The Mongolo River is located in regions of New South Wales and the Australian Capital territory and was likely given its initial name by the Moolinggolah people in the area. Their "discoveries" in the Limestone Plains is recognised to be one of the first European colonised areas of Canberra that consisted of farming properties and a small village. Charles Throsby Smith wrote on the same expedition about "the beautiful forest country, gentle hills and valleys, well watered by streams, and a fine rich Black Soil. Came to a Beautiful River that was running thro' the plains in a S.W. direction, by the side of which we slept that night." This was the Mongolo River. More generally, the discovery made by Wild and others would become the capital city of Australia, and the largest inland city in the country, 8th largest overall.

The third expedition to the Canberra district was in March 1821, when Throsby, Wild and an unnamed Aboriginal guide travelled inland from Bong Bong via Lake George and found the Murrumbidgee River, which was actually the objective of the earlier two expeditions. Wild's last expedition to the district was with Captains Mark Currie and John Ovens in May–June 1823 which explored as far south as the Monaro.

=== Wildes Meadow ===
He is accredited with the discovery of Wildes Meadow. He came across the site when searching for cattle that had become stray just next to his property at Bong Bong. The meadow is located in the Southern Highlands of New South Wales in the Wingecarribee Shire, and under the federal electorate of Throsby. The first settler-colonist to reside in the area was an Irish immigrant named Daniel Bresnahan in 1859. The land has always had some reference to Wild, with the deeds of many of the early properties in the area named the geographical location 'Joe Wild's Meadow'. Later, the land's name became Wild's Meadow, then Myra Vale, then finally Wilde's Meadow. Today the area lends itself to agricultural practices, with 56.1% of its population, 515 in 2011, involved in agriculture.

== Other careers and contributions ==
External to Wilds ambitions for discovery, he also held several other employment positions. In 1815, he was appointed as the first constable of the Five Islands district. This area is now known as Illawarra. Although, Wild did not spend too much time in the region, still committed to exploring parts of New South Wales. It is thus know whether Wild was a 'resident' constable or not, possibly holding the title but having true jurisdiction due to geographical constraints. This could have occurred because there was an insufficient population in the region to require the presence of a full-time constable. Wild was also involved in the construction of the road to the land himself, Throsby and others had discovered. He became the superintendent of the road's development in October 1819. In this role, his was paid £20 per annum and given rations for his service to the project. The road was 75 miles in length going between Picton and Gouldburn, however he was only the overseer for a small proportion of the build. Governor Macquarie praised Wild's oversight of the project, and as such named a section of the road "Wild's Pass". Then, in 1821, Wild became a constable for the new County of Argyle. This land includes the area near Gouldburn, bounded by Lake George and several river systems.

Furthermore, after the death of Charles Throsby, Wild was appointed as head stockman for Charles Throsby Jr. As head stockman he was directly responsible for the wellbeing of the livestock on the land. Wild eventually married Elizabeth, having several children, the exact number unknown. His family settled in the County of Camden during the 1820s. Camden is located 65 km from Sydney. There is mention of this place of residence in Cunningham's journal, where "Wild...cut [a] road from Little Mountain to Cow Run." It is further believed that Wild's widow Elizabeth was responsible for the organisation of the first village in the area (the Private Village of Vanderville).

== Death and legacy ==
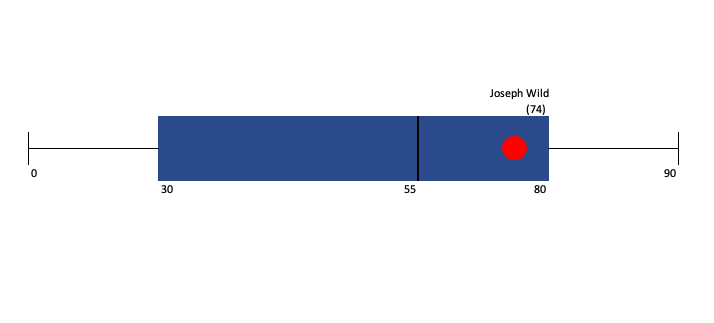
Joseph Wilds' life span relative to the statistical spread of the time

It is recorded that Joseph Wild died on 25 May 1847, aged 88. The cause of his death is unknown, but it is possible that he was killed by a bull at Wingecarribee Swamp. Wild was the first person to receive a grave in the churchyard at Bong Bong. Reverend S. A. Howard, one of the area's honorary historians, supported and sponsored the bronze memorial plaque over Wild's gravestone. His gravestone still exists and reads "In memory of Joseph Wild, accredited explorer discover of Lake George and first finder of Wildes Meadow". To many, Joseph Wild is recognised for his assistance and contributions to the tasks of some of Australia's most famous explorers. He was mentioned countless times in Backhouse and Walkers journals of 1836, where details of his value on expeditions was made clear.

== See also ==
- List of convicts transported to Australia
