= Moss Vale =

- Town
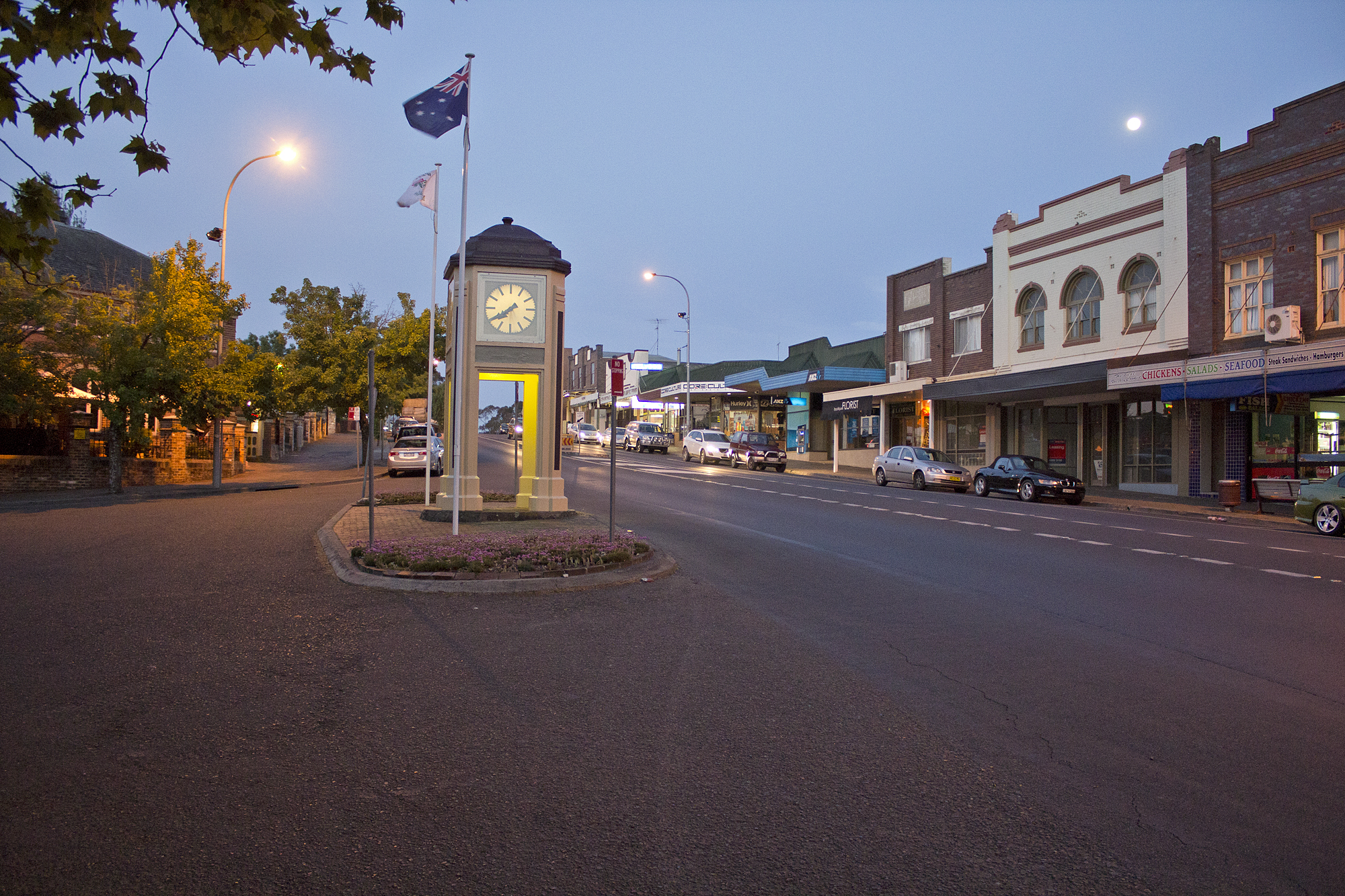
- Argyle Street, which forms part of the Illawarra Highway

- Coordinates: 34°33′S 150°23′E
- Country: Australia
- State: New South Wales
- Region: Southern Highlands
- LGA: Wingecarribee Shire
- Location: 142 km (88 mi) SSW of Sydney; 159 km (99 mi) NNE of Canberra; 71 km (44 mi) NE of Goulburn; 80 km (50 mi) SW of Wollongong; 70 km (43 mi) NW of Nowra
- Established: 1861

Government
  - State electorate: Goulburn
  - Federal division: Whitlam
- Elevation: 678 m (2,224 ft)

Population
  - Total: 8,774 (UCL 2021)
- Postcode: 2577
- County: Camden
- Parish: Bong Bong
- Mean max temp: 18.9 °C (66.0 °F)
- Mean min temp: 8.2 °C (46.8 °F)
- Annual rainfall: 784.5 mm (30.89 in)
Localities around Moss Vale
Berrima	Burradoo	Bong Bong
Belanglo	Moss Vale	Calwalla
Sutton Forest	Werai	Manchester Square; Yarrunga

Moss Vale is a town in the Southern Highlands of New South Wales, Australia. Moss Vale is the administrative centre of Wingecarribee Shire local government area. It is located 142 kilometres (88 mi) south-west of Sydney and 159 kilometres (99 mi) north-east of Canberra. The Illawarra Highway, which connects to Wollongong and the Illawarra coast via Macquarie Pass.

Moss Vale has several heritage buildings. In the centre of the main street is Leighton Gardens. Moss Vale has undergone recent (2019) gentrification. It has become a hub for independent and creative businesses, including design stores, cafes, and bars. The town has a commercial district and a golf course, including a large parkland, Cecil Hoskins Nature Reserve.

== History ==
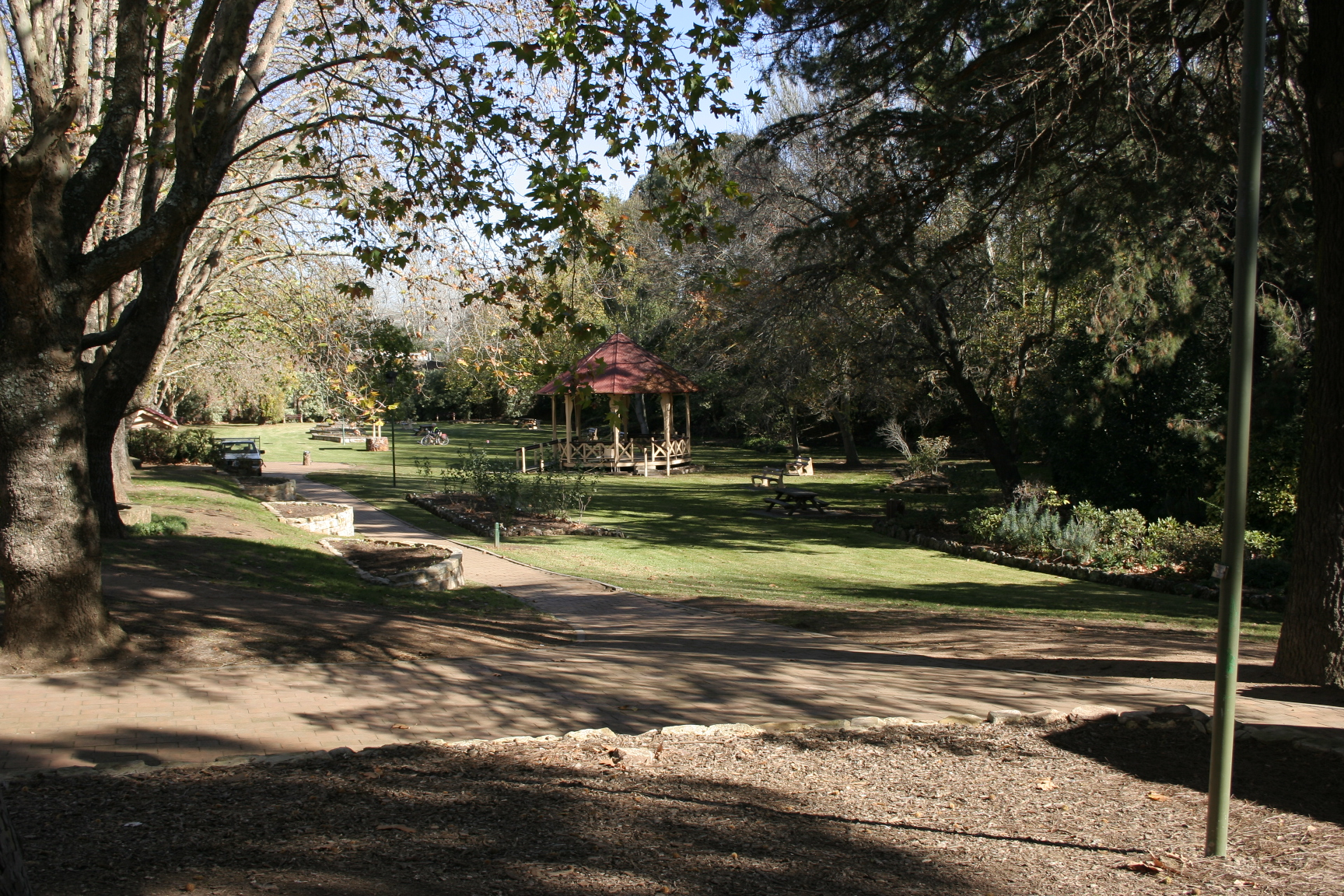
Leighton Gardens

The Moss Vale area was once occupied by the Gandangara people, though they had disappeared by the 1870s, partly due to the loss of their hunting land to European settlers. Governor Hunter sent a party led by ex-convict John Wilson to investigate the area in 1798. Various others explored the area up to 1815, including John Warby, George Caley, Hamilton Hume and John Oxley. Hume, Charles Throsby and Joseph Wild explored the area west of Sutton Forest in 1817 and in 1818, together with James Meehan, they explored the area between Moss Vale and Jervis Bay. Governor Macquarie granted Throsby 1,000 acres (4.0 km^{2}), known as Throsby Park, at Bong Bong, on the northeastern outskirts of Moss Vale and put him in charge of building the Old Argyle Road from Sydney to Goulburn in 1819. This road was replaced in the 1830s by a more direct road via Berrima surveyed by Thomas Mitchell and most of the population of Bong Bong moved to Berrima. The heritage-listed property of Throsby Park house was built about 1834, six years after Throsby's suicide.

The area, which was considered to be part of Sutton Forest, remained rural until the coming of the railway. Subdivision part of Throsby Park for the town of Moss Vale, named after Jemmy Moss, a herdsman at Throsby Park, commenced in 1864, in anticipation of the opening of Sutton Forest railway station in 1867 at the intersection with Old Argyle Road. Governor Belmore rented Throsby Park from 1870 to 1872 to what is commonly believed to escape the summer heat of Sydney. The railway and the Robertson Land Acts encouraged denser settlement by selectors in the Southern Highlands and led to the growth of Moss Vale as a town. In 1877 Sutton Forest railway station was renamed Moss Vale.

== Climate ==
Moss Vale has an oceanic climate (Cfb) with warm to mild, rainy summers and cool sunny winters.

Climate data for Moss Vale AWS (2001–2022); 678 m AMSL; 34.53° S, 150.42° E
Month	Jan	Feb	Mar	Apr	May	Jun	Jul	Aug	Sep	Oct	Nov	Dec	Year
Record high °C (°F)	40.9 (105.6)	41.2 (106.2)	37.0 (98.6)	30.7 (87.3)	23.4 (74.1)	20.3 (68.5)	21.4 (70.5)	22.5 (72.5)	30.4 (86.7)	31.7 (89.1)	37.9 (100.2)	41.1 (106.0)	41.2 (106.2)
Mean daily maximum °C (°F)	26.2 (79.2)	24.4 (75.9)	21.8 (71.2)	19.2 (66.6)	15.5 (59.9)	12.5 (54.5)	11.9 (53.4)	13.4 (56.1)	16.7 (62.1)	19.5 (67.1)	22.0 (71.6)	24.1 (75.4)	18.9 (66.1)
Mean daily minimum °C (°F)	14.2 (57.6)	14.0 (57.2)	12.1 (53.8)	8.7 (47.7)	4.9 (40.8)	3.4 (38.1)	2.5 (36.5)	3.0 (37.4)	5.4 (41.7)	7.9 (46.2)	10.5 (50.9)	12.2 (54.0)	8.2 (46.8)
Record low °C (°F)	4.1 (39.4)	5.1 (41.2)	2.2 (36.0)	−2.5 (27.5)	−3.4 (25.9)	−6.3 (20.7)	−5.7 (21.7)	−5.4 (22.3)	−4.0 (24.8)	−2.0 (28.4)	−0.1 (31.8)	2.0 (35.6)	−6.3 (20.7)
Average precipitation mm (inches)	65.0 (2.56)	101.4 (3.99)	96.6 (3.80)	55.9 (2.20)	48.3 (1.90)	76.5 (3.01)	63.7 (2.51)	54.7 (2.15)	41.9 (1.65)	52.8 (2.08)	72.3 (2.85)	60.1 (2.37)	784.5 (30.89)
Average precipitation days	13.2	14.2	16.6	15.7	15.0	16.8	13.8	12.3	11.5	12.1	14.2	12.5	167.9
Average afternoon relative humidity (%)	51	60	59	58	60	63	61	53	51	51	56	52	56

== Heritage listings ==
Moss Vale has a number of heritage-listed sites, including:

- Church Road: Throsby Park
- Main Southern railway: Moss Vale railway station
- Main Southern railway 146.037: Argyle Street railway bridge
- Oldbury Road: Oldbury Farm

== Population ==
At the 2021 census, 9,310 people were living in Moss Vale.

According to the 2016 census of Population, there were 8,579 people in Moss Vale. Aboriginal and Torres Strait Islander people made up 2.6% of the population. 78.2% of people were born in Australia. The most common other countries of birth were England 4.4%, New Zealand 1.7% and China 1.5%. 87.2% of people only spoke English at home. Other languages spoken at home included Mandarin at 1.3%. The most common responses for religion were No Religion 25.8%, Anglican 24.9% and Catholic 22.1%.

Historical population
Year	Pop.	±%
1921	1,947	—
1933	2,359	+21.2%
1947		—
1954	2,748	—
1961	3,040	+10.6%
1966	3,144	+3.4%
1971	3,235	+2.9%
1976	3,638	+12.5%
1981	4,415	+21.4%
1986	5,016	+13.6%
1991	5,960	+18.8%
1996	6,108	+2.5%
2001	6,601	+8.1%
2006	6,723	+1.8%
2011	7,305	+8.7%
2016	7,865	+7.7%
2021	8,774	+11.6%
Source: Australian Bureau of Statistics data.

== Economy ==
Moss Vale holds a large part of the Southern Highlands Industry – as well as being a minor centre for agriculture, many light and medium industries are found in and around Moss Vale, including a James Hardie plant, a HarperCollins book distribution centre, and other manufacturing industries. Despite Moss Vale's prowess as an industrial centre, nearby Bowral is the commercial heart of the Southern Highlands.

Moss Vale is believed to have fertile soil and good precipitation. Agricultural rural holdings in the area specialise in dairy herds, mainly Holstein Frisian, and there is an assortment of beef studs and sheep properties.

== Council and safety ==
The Wingecarribee Shire Council Chambers are located at 68 Elizabeth Street, Moss Vale. They can be found online at: Wingecarribee Shire Council Website Wingecarribee Shire Council Facebook Page

The Southern Highlands Police Station, part of the Hume Police District is the main NSW Police Force Station serving the Southern Highlands (Wingecarribee Shire). It is located at 67 Elizabeth Street. Moss Vale has a New South Wales Rural Fire Service Brigade which is located at 49 Berrima Road. There is also a Fire and Rescue NSW Station which is located at 64 Elizabeth Street, Moss Vale which is across the road from the Police Station and just up from the Wingecarribee Shire Council Chambers.

== Transport ==
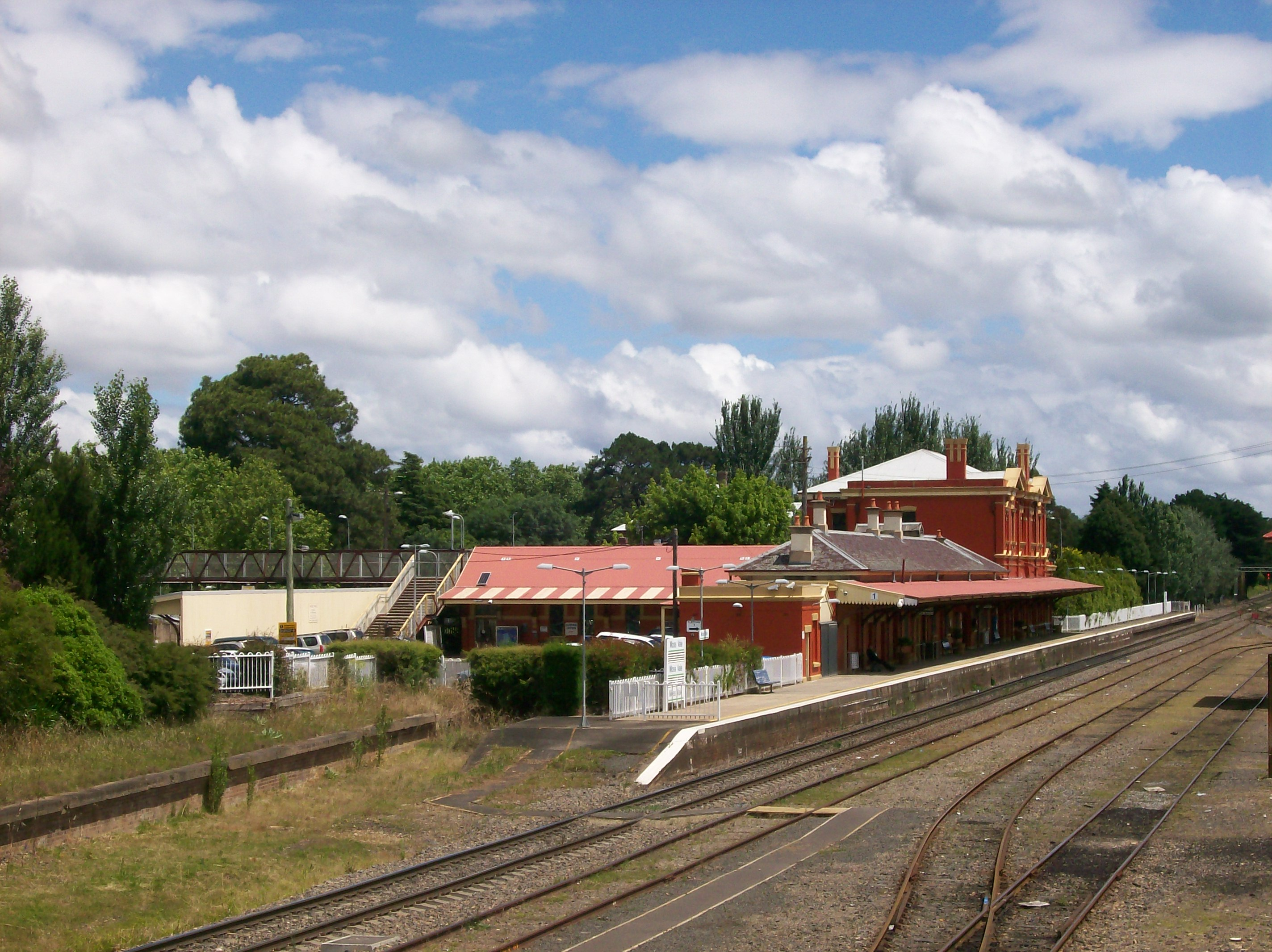
Moss Vale railway station

Moss Vale station is the primary southern terminus of the Southern Highlands railway line. The line provides regular services from Moss Vale to southern Sydney, where a change of trains is generally required to access the city centre. Limited services continue south of Moss Vale to Goulburn and beyond (intercity, regional and interstate).

The station has 4 Melbourne XPT services a day (2 to Melbourne, 2 to Sydney), with other services towards Canberra (3 daily trips in each direction) and Griffith (2 return trips per week).

Moss Vale is the junction of the Unanderra – Moss Vale railway line to Wollongong, opened in 1932, but now only used by freight trains.

== Television ==
Television is delivered from the Illawarra region with a transmitter based on Mount Gibraltar.

The Southern NSW Channels are:

ABC (with ABC News, ABC Family, ABC Entertains, ABC Kids)

SBS (with SBS2, SBS Food, SBS WorldWatch, SBS World Movies, NITV)

7 Moss Vale (with 7two, 7mate, 7flix, 7Bravo, Racing.com, TVSN) – Seven Network owned and operated station

WIN Television (with 9Go!, 9Gem, 9Life and Gold) – Nine Network affiliate

10 Southern NSW (with 10 Drama, 10 Comedy, Nickelodeon, News24 Regional, SBN and gecko) – Network 10 owned and operated station

== School ==
Schools in Moss Vale:

- Moss Vale High School
- Moss Vale Public School
- St Paul's Catholic Primary School
- St Paul's International College
- Tudor House School

== Churches ==
Churches in Moss Vale:

- Connect Christian Church (AOG/ACC)
- Moss Vale Jehovah's Witnesses Hall
- Moss Vale Uniting Church in Australia
- St Andrews Presbyterian Church
- St John's Anglican Church
- St Paul's Roman Catholic Church

== Sport ==
Sporting teams in Moss Vale:

- Moss Vale Basketball
- Moss Vale Cricket Club
- Moss Vale Dragonflies Netball Club
- Moss Vale Dragons Rugby League Club
- Moss Vale Golf Club
- Moss Vale Hockey Club
- Moss Vale Rifle Club
- Moss Vale Soccer Club (Highlands Soccer Association or HSA for short)

== Notable residents ==
- Ann Carr-Boyd, composer and musicologist
- Tom Green, artist
- Tony Lockett, former AFL player for the Sydney Swans
- Steve Prestwich, drummer for popular Australian rock band, Cold Chisel
- Ray Stone, rugby league player
- Simon Spargo, renowned teacher

=== Notable former residents ===
- Frank Tidswell, microbiologist, and his wife Edith lived at Farnborough in the 1930s
- Major General Ian Ross Campbell, CBE, DSO and Bar, (23 March 1900 – 31 October 1997) was born in Moss Vale
