= Charles Throsby =

Australian politician

- Born: 1777; Glenfield, Leicestershire
- Died: 2 April 1828 (aged 50–51); Sydney
- Occupations: Surgeon, explorer
- Known for: Exploration, pioneer

Charles Throsby (1777 – 2 April 1828) was an English surgeon who, after he migrated to New South Wales in 1802, became an explorer, pioneer and parliamentarian. He opened up much new land beyond the Blue Mountains for colonial settlement.

== Early life ==
Throsby was born in Glenfield near Leicester in England. He was engaged as a surgeon on the convict transport Coromandel carrying 136 male convicts from Portsmouth to Sydney. They departed Portsmouth 12 February 1802, and arrived in Sydney without calling in port on 13 June 1802, with no reported convict deaths under his care.

Soon afterwards he joined the medical staff of the Colony, and in October 1802 he was appointed a magistrate and acting-surgeon at Castle Hill. In August 1804 he was transferred to Newcastle, and in April 1805 was made superintendent there. Towards the end of 1808 he was given a grant of 500 acres (2 km^{2}) at Cabramatta, and in the following year resigned his position at Newcastle. In 1811 he was employed as agent by the colony's wealthiest landowner, Sir John Jamison, of Regentville.

== Exploration ==
In 1817, Throsby did some exploration near Moss Vale and Sutton Forest.

On 8 March 1818, with James Meehan, he set out to determine a route to Jervis Bay. Determining that he had no hope of finding his way to his intended destination, he couldn't decide whether to keep going or head back. A pair of Aboriginal people helped him get through the valley by way of Meryla Pass.

On 25 April 1819 Throsby pioneered exploration west of the Blue Mountains, when he left the Cowpastures (near the present day Camden). Macquarie stated in a dispatch that "the rich fertile country passed over by Mr Throsby . . . will be fully equal to meet every increase of the population . . . for many years". Throsby undertook the journey with John Rowley, two servants John Wait and Joe Wild, and two Aboriginal guides, named Cookoogong and Dual.

In April 1821 Throsby discovered the Murrumbidgee River, near Pine Island in Tuggeranong.

Charles Throsby had no children, and his estate was inherited by his nephew, Charles Throsby junior. He had previously been sent for and arrived on the Mangles on 7 August 1820. The nephew and his family prospered in the Moss Vale area. He married Elizabeth "Betsey" Broughton, one of the survivors of the 1809 Boyd massacre, and had many children. Throsby Park in Moss Vale was occupied by five generations of the family.

== Legacy ==
Throsby is commemorated in the name of the Canberra suburb of Throsby, Throsby Creek in Newcastle, New South Wales and the former federal electoral Division of Throsby.

== See also ==
- Charles Throsby Smith, his nephew
