= Exeter crossing loop collision =

1914 railway accident in New South Wales

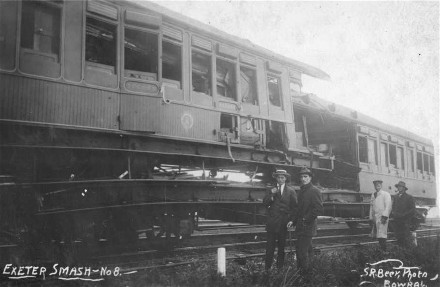
- Telescoped carriages

Details
- Date: 13 March 1914
- Location: Exeter, New South Wales
- Coordinates: 34.6138°S 150.3173°E
- Country: Australia
- Line: Main South railway line
- Operator: New South Wales Government Railways

Statistics
- Deaths: 14

On 13 March 1914, a Temora Mail Train and a goods train collided with each other at Exeter railway station, New South Wales. At that time the main line was a single track, with a crossing loop and a down refuge siding at Exeter.

== Events leading to accident ==
The up fast goods train was running late by the time it reached Exeter. Despite the train's being too long to be accommodated in the loop at that station, the signaller [night officer] turned the train into the loop. When the locomotive had reached the points at the Sydney end of the station, the rear of the train was still on the main line at the southern end.

Faced with the knowledge that the Temora Mail would soon be due, the goods train was brought forward so that it could be reversed into a siding on the eastern side of the station yard. It was during this manoeuvre that the Temora Mail struck the goods train head-on.

== Court trial for manslaughter ==
Questions were swiftly raised as to why two trains should collide when the goods train should have had the protection of the home signal. The mail train driver claimed that the distant signal was clear when he passed it; however, as there was a thick fog at the time, he did not sight the home signal, which was against him, until the train was right upon it.

The driver of the mail train was brought before the Goulburn Circuit Court charged with manslaughter. At that trial, the night officer at Exeter gave evidence to the effect that the down distant signal was in fact at danger at the time the mail train passed. The night officer further stated that there was no fog that night, but that just before the goods train arrived a slight mist had set in. However, the goods train driver gave conflicting evidence, stating that on the night of the accident the denseness of the fog made it difficult to see the signals.

After a retirement of more than four hours, the jury delivered a verdict of "not guilty."

== Deceased ==
The collision killed 14. Five were said to have been killed almost instantly, three died while still crushed in their carriages, one succumbed as rescuers reached him, and two died on the Exeter station platform. The remaining three reportedly died in a temporary hospital that had been set up in a sleeping carriage. Alfred Bray, the guard, was one of those killed in the collision.
