= Passing loop =

Place on a railway where trains can pass each other

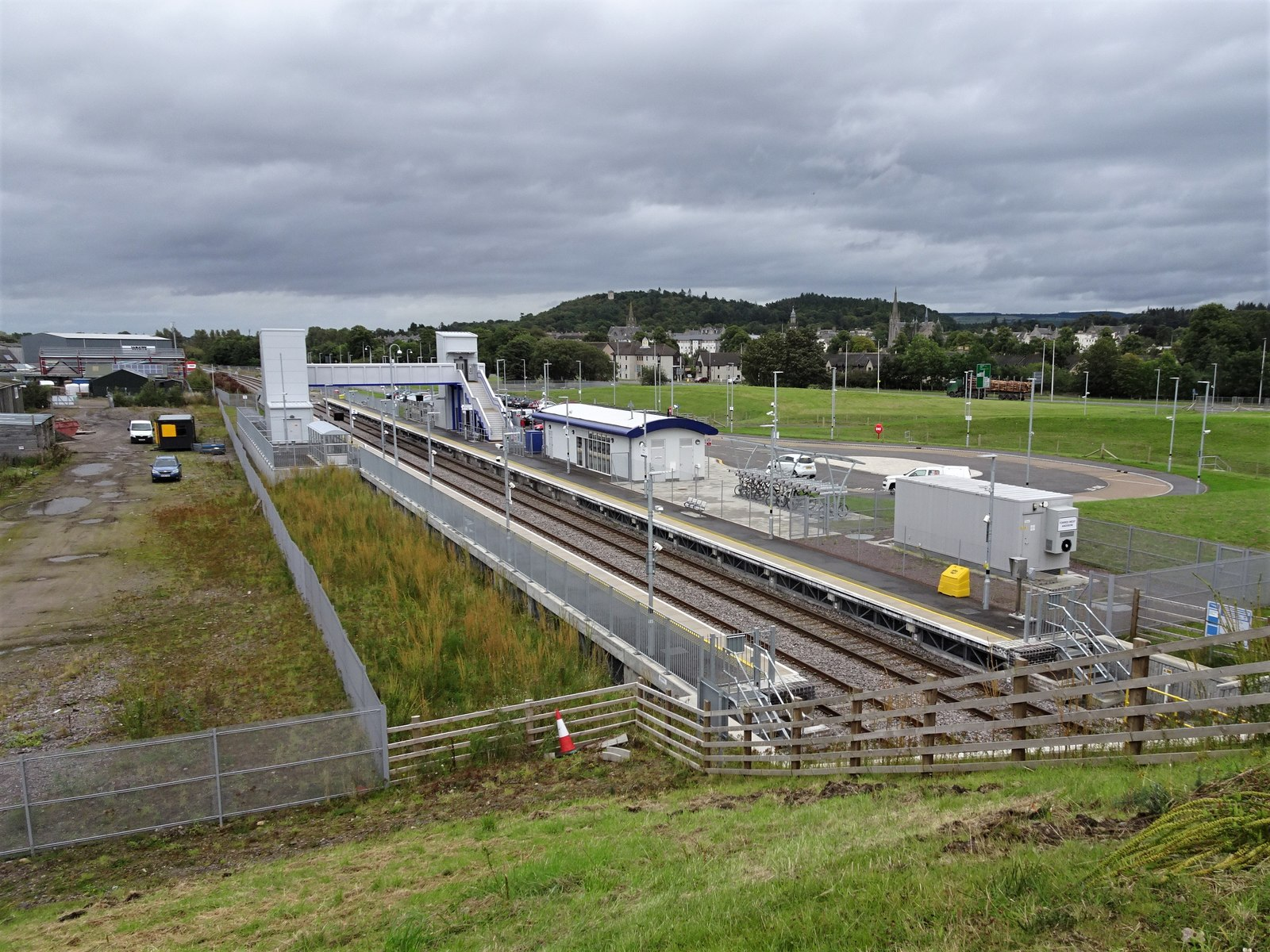
Forres railway station acts as a passing loop between two single-track sections of the Aberdeen-Inverness line

A passing loop (UK usage) or passing siding (North America) (also called a crossing loop, crossing place, refuge loop or, colloquially, a hole) is a place on a single line railway or tramway, often located at or near a station, where trains or trams travelling in opposite directions can pass each other. Trains/trams going in the same direction can also overtake, provided that the signalling arrangement allows it. A passing loop is double-ended and connected to the main track at both ends, though a dead end siding known as a refuge siding, which is much less convenient, can be used. A similar arrangement is used on the gauntlet track of cable railways and funiculars, and in passing places on single-track roads.

Ideally, the loop should be longer than all trains needing to cross at that point. Unless the loop is of sufficient length to be dynamic, the first train to arrive must stop or move very slowly, while the second to arrive may pass at speed. If one train is too long for the loop it must wait for the opposing train to enter the loop before proceeding, taking a few minutes. Ideally, the shorter train should arrive first and leave second. If both trains are too long for the loop, time-consuming "see-sawing" (or "double saw-by") operations are required for the trains to cross (see Tawa railway station).

On railway systems that use platforms, especially high-level platforms, for passengers to board and disembark from trains, the platforms may be provided on both the main and loop tracks or possibly on only one of them.

== Systems of working ==
=== Main and loop (main track with platform) ===
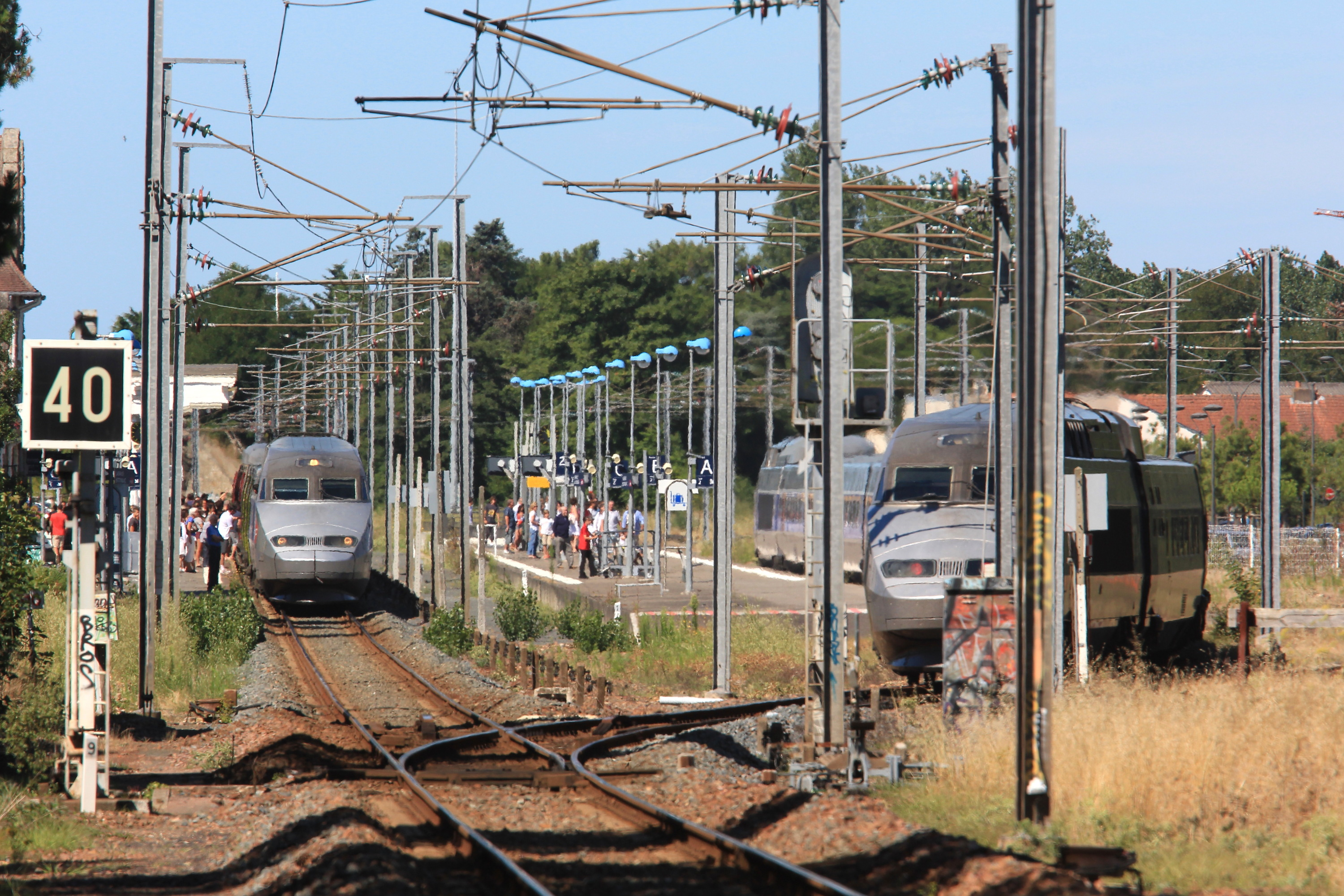
Two TGVs crossing each other at a station in France.

The main line has straight track, while the loop line has low-speed turnouts at either end. If the station has only one platform, then it is usually located on the main line.

If passenger trains are relatively few in number, and the likelihood of two passenger trains crossing each other low, the platform on the loop line may be omitted.

If the passenger train from one direction always arrives first, the platform on the loop line may also be omitted by extending the platform past the loop in that direction.

=== Platform road and through road (main track without platform) ===
The through road has straight track, while the platform road has low-speed turnouts at either end.

A possible advantage of this layout is that trains scheduled to pass straight through the station can do so uninterrupted; they do not have to reduce their speed to pass through the curve. This layout is mostly used at local stations where many passenger trains do not stop.

Since there is only one passenger platform, it is not convenient to cross two passenger trains if both stop.

This type of passing loop is common in Russia and post-Soviet states. A disadvantage of the platform and through arrangement is the speed limits through the turnouts at each end.

=== Up and down working ===
In the example layout shown, trains take the left-hand track in their direction of running. Low-speed turnouts restrict the speed in one direction. Two platform faces are needed, and they can be provided either at a single island platform or two side platforms (as shown). Overtaking is not normally possible at this kind of up-and-down loop as some of the necessary signals are absent.

Crossing loops using up-and-down working are very common in British practice. For one thing, fewer signals are required if the tracks in the station are signaled for one direction only; also, there is less likelihood of a collision caused by signalling a train onto the track reserved for trains in the opposing direction. In France, they often use spring switches and the speed is equally restricted in both directions.

The speed restriction in one direction can be eliminated with higher-speed turnouts, but this may require power operation, as the longer and heavier high-speed turnouts may be beyond the capability of manual lever operation.

=== Dead-end siding ===
Refuge sidings are used at locations with gradients too steep for heavy freight trains or steam haulage to depart from conventional passing loops, or confined spaces where a passing loop cannot be built. An extra parallel siding is often built at stations on refuge sidings so that two stopping trains can pass, and an extended catch point opposite the refuge siding may be added so as not to interfere with passing trains.

=== Overtaking siding ===
 Overtaking loops can also be provided on dual track lines, typically at stations, for the purpose of providing a location for express trains to overtake local trains. This layout has extensive use in high-speed rail and East Asian rapid transit systems. In this layout a local train enters the siding allowing a scheduled express train to overtake it.
Double platform road and through road: Passing loop configuration allowing local trains to serve the station and wait for an express service to pass straight through the station to overtake uninterrupted.

Double main and loop: Passing loop configuration allowing express and local trains to serve the station before the express service overtakes the local service.

== Dynamic passing loop ==
If a crossing loop is several times the length of the trains using it, and is suitably signalled, then trains proceeding in opposite directions can pass (cross) each other without having to stop or even slow down. This greatly reduces the time lost by the first train to arrive at the crossing loop for the opposing train to go by. This system is referred to as a dynamic loop. For example, the Windermere branch line will be getting one to permit a 2tph service pattern.

== Overlaps and catch points ==
Some railways fit catch points at the ends of crossing loops so that if a train overruns the loop, it is derailed rather than collide with an opposing train.

Since the available space for crossing loops is usually limited, they do not normally have an overlap (safety margin) between the starting signals and the end of the double line. In Australia, the Australian Rail Track Corporation (ARTC) policy provides for overlaps of about 500 m and 200 m respectively in an effort to avoid derailment or collision.

== Automatic operation ==
Many crossing loops are designed to operate automatically in an unattended mode. Such loops may be track-circuited with home signals cleared by the approaching train. Some loops have the points in and out of the loop operated manually, albeit more recent examples have so-called self-restoring switches that allow trains to exit a loop without needing to change the points.

Other forms of remote operation included centralized traffic control, in which a train controller changes points and signals from a remote office; and driver-operated points, which enable train crews to use a radio system to set the points from a distance.

== Gradients ==
The design of crossing loops may have to be modified where there are severe gradients that make it difficult for a train to restart from a stationary position, or where the terrain is unsuitable for a normal loop.

A crossing loop on steep gradient may have catch points on the downhill end to reduce the impact of runaways.

== Train length ==
Since central operation of the points and signals from a single signal box is convenient, and since there are practical limits for the distance to these points and signals, crossing loops can have a system-wide effect on train sizes.

== Line capacity ==
Line capacity is partly determined by the distance between individual crossing loops. Ideally these should be located at inverse-integer intervals along the track by travel time. The longest section between successive crossing loops will, like the weakest link in a chain, determine the overall line capacity.

=== Short loops ===
Long and short trains can cross at a short loop if the long train arrives second but leaves first.

It is best if all crossing loops are longer than the longest train. Two long trains can cross at a short loop using a slow so-called see-saw process, which wastes time.

== Right- and left-hand traffic ==
Countries generally have a principle on which side trains shall meet, either on the left or on the right, generally the same for the whole country. But this is generally valid only on double track. On passing loops this principle is not necessarily used. Often the train that shall not stop uses the straight track. See also Right- and left-hand traffic.

== Gallery ==
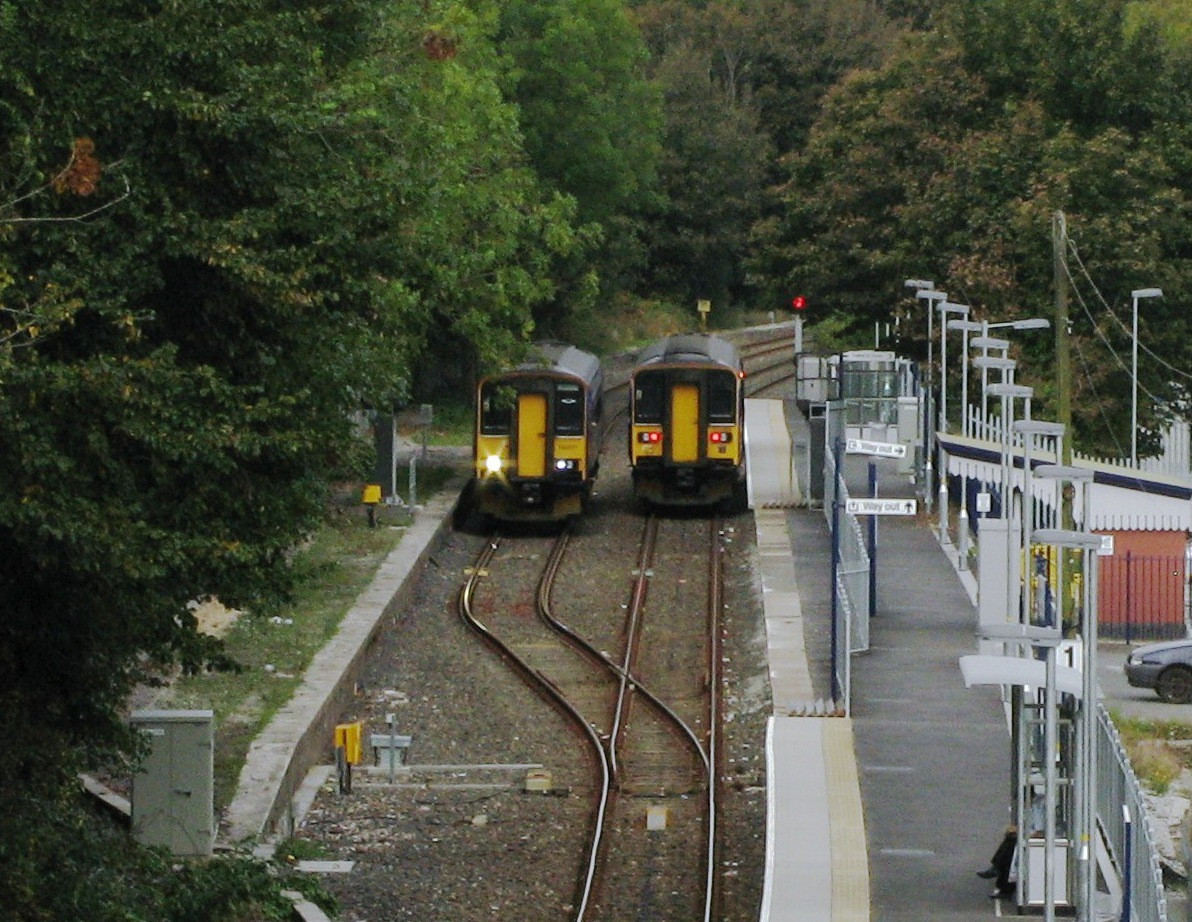
Trains in a passing loop at Penryn railway station in the United Kingdom

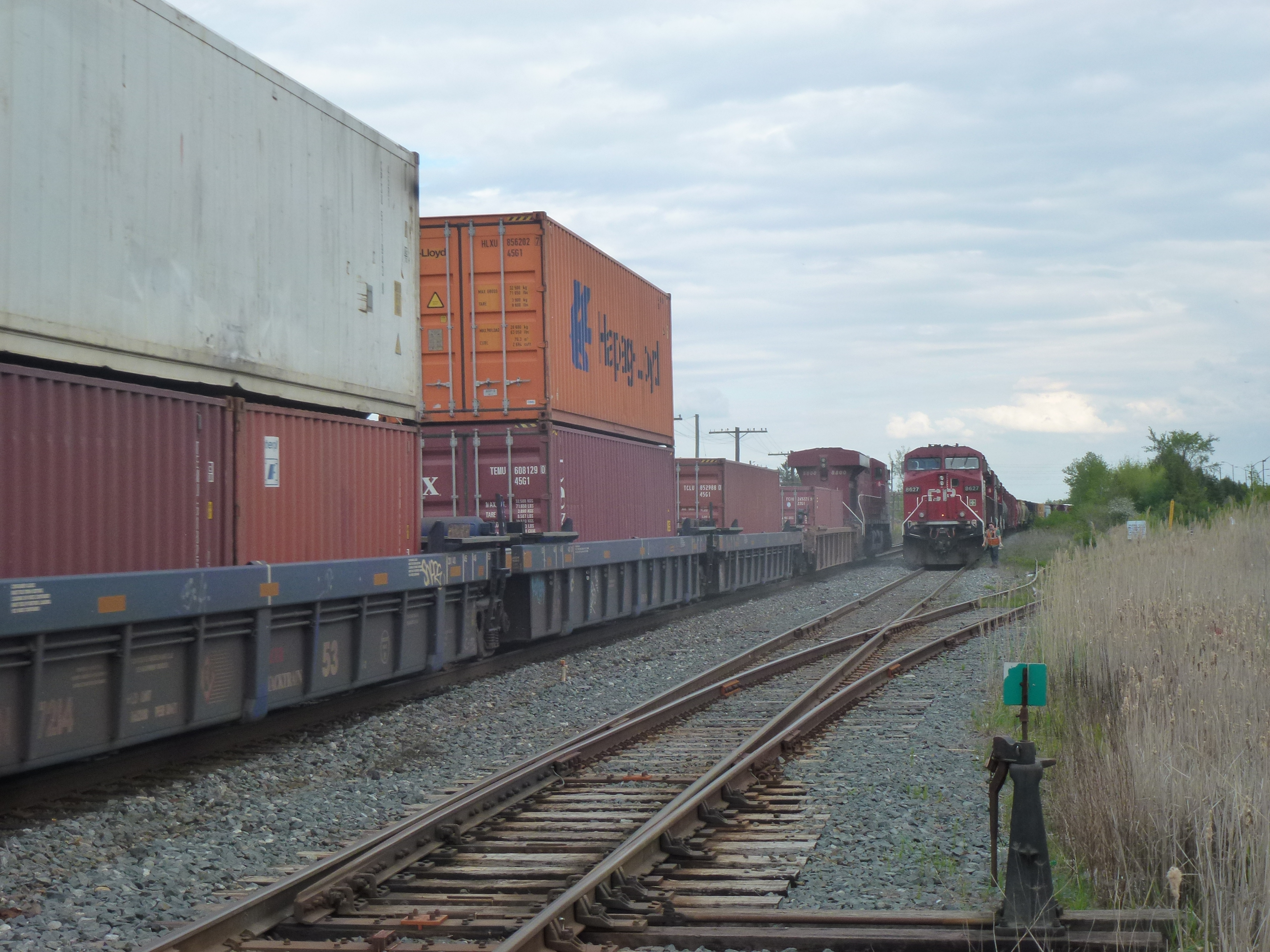
Passing sidings in North America can be very long. This one in Bolton, Ontario – the track on the right – measures some 3.5 km (2.2 mi).

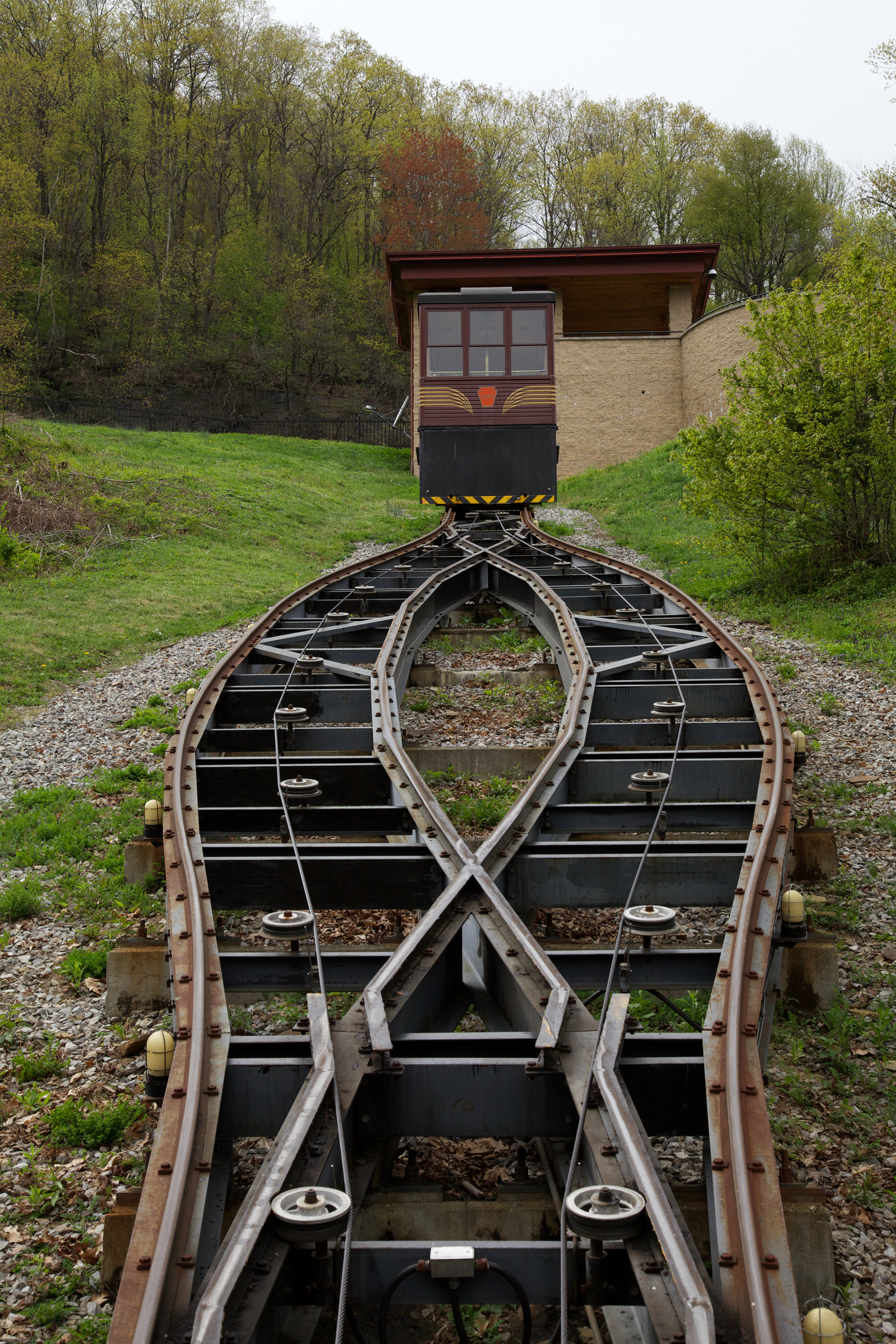
A short passing track on a funicular in Pennsylvania

== Accidents at crossing loops ==
Date	Incident	Location	Details
1900	Casey Jones	Vaughan, Mississippi, USA	The legendary train driver (U.S.: engineer) John Luther "Casey" Jones was killed in an accident involving trains too long to cross at a passing loop. The trains trying to cross were occupying both the main and loop tracks, and in addition, the train doing the see-saw was standing outside station limits. Jones was traveling fast in order to make up lost time, and could not stop in time to avoid a collision. He was able to slow his train from an estimated 75 mph (121 km/h) to an estimated 35 mph (56 km/h) at the time of collision; none of the passengers on Jones's train was seriously injured, and Jones was the only fatality.
1914	Exeter crossing loop collision	Exeter, New South Wales, Australia	Occurred at Exeter railway station in fog: one train too long for loop; line duplicated soon after
1917	Ciurea rail disaster	Ciurea station, Romania	
1947	Dugald rail accident	Dugald, Manitoba, Canada	
1963	Geurie crossing loop collision	Geurie, New South Wales, Australia	Train in loop standing foul of main line, causing collision
1969	Violet Town	Violet Town, Victoria, Australia	Signal passed at danger after driver dies from heart attack
1996	Hines Hill train collision	Hines Hill, Western Australia	Driver appears to have misjudged distance to starting signal
1999	Zanthus train collision	Zanthus, Western Australia	Co-driver operated loop points prematurely
2006	Ngungumbane train collision	Zimbabwe	
2023	2023 Odisha train collision	Balasore, Odisha, India	A passenger train was wrongly switched to a passing loop and hit a parked freight train at full speed; derailed coaches were then struck by another passenger train moving in the opposite direction. Probably no "Track Circuits".
2024	2024 Talerddig train collision	Talerddig, Powys, Wales	A passenger train failed to stop at a passing loop due to poor wheel/rail adhesion, colliding with another train travelling in the opposite direction. Probably no "overlaps".

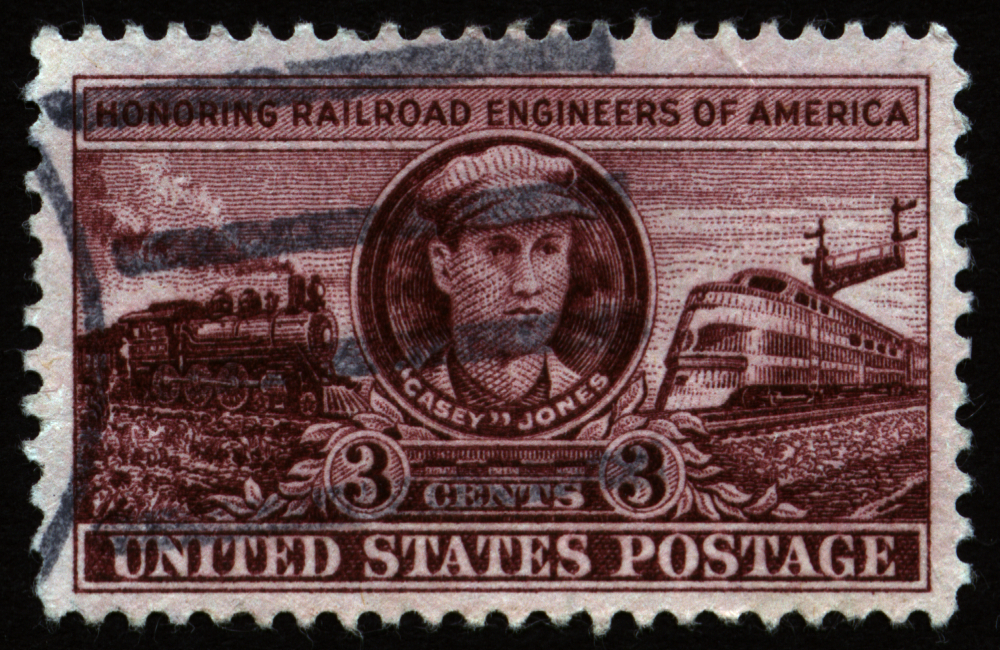
Casey Jones as depicted on a 3 cent postage stamp issued by the United States Postal Service

== Other names and types ==
- crossing loop or crossing place
- passing siding (US)
- passing track (Canada and US)
- refuge loop - used on double track lines
- A run-around loop enables a locomotive to change ends when a train has reached a terminus station.
- Spirals are sometimes called loops.
- Balloon loops are sometimes called loops.

== See also ==
- Glossary of North American railway terminology
- Lists of rail accidents
- Refuge siding
- Siding
- Train meet
