= Kareela railway station =

Former railway station in New South Wales, Australia

Kareela

General information
- Location: Penrose, New South Wales; Australia
- Coordinates: 34°40′09″S 150°13′33″E
- Operator: New South Wales Government Railways
- Line: Main Southern
- Distance: 169.785 kilometres from Central
- Platforms: 1 (1 side)
- Tracks: 1

Construction
- Structure type: Ground

Other information
- Status: Demolished

History
- Opened: 1 November 1889
- Closed: 19 September 1915
- Former names: Wollondilly (1889-1891)

Services
Preceding station	Former services	Following station
Penrose towards Albury	Main Southern Line	Bundanoon towards Sydney
Location

Kareela railway station was a regional railway station on the Main Southern line, serving the Southern Highlands town of Penrose.

== History ==
It opened in 1889, 170 km south of Sydney, originally as Wollondilly, and was renamed Kareela on 27 June 1891. It closed in 1915, as a result of the duplication of the Main South railway line that was completed in September of that year.

There was a post office nearby, also known as Kareela, which closed in 1916, as a result of the earlier station closure. Penrose Public School was known as Kareela, from 1891 to 1922. Referring to the surrounding area as Kareela continued into the 1920s, but became uncommon after 1925. Penrose Road was called Kareela Road until 1982. The parallel road, which runs along the northern side of the railway line, is now known as Kareela Road, but the former locality is now either part of Penrose or Bundanoon.

The name has since been applied to a suburb in Sydney, Kareela, since 1968.
