= Penrose railway station, New South Wales =

Railway station in New South Wales, Australia

Penrose
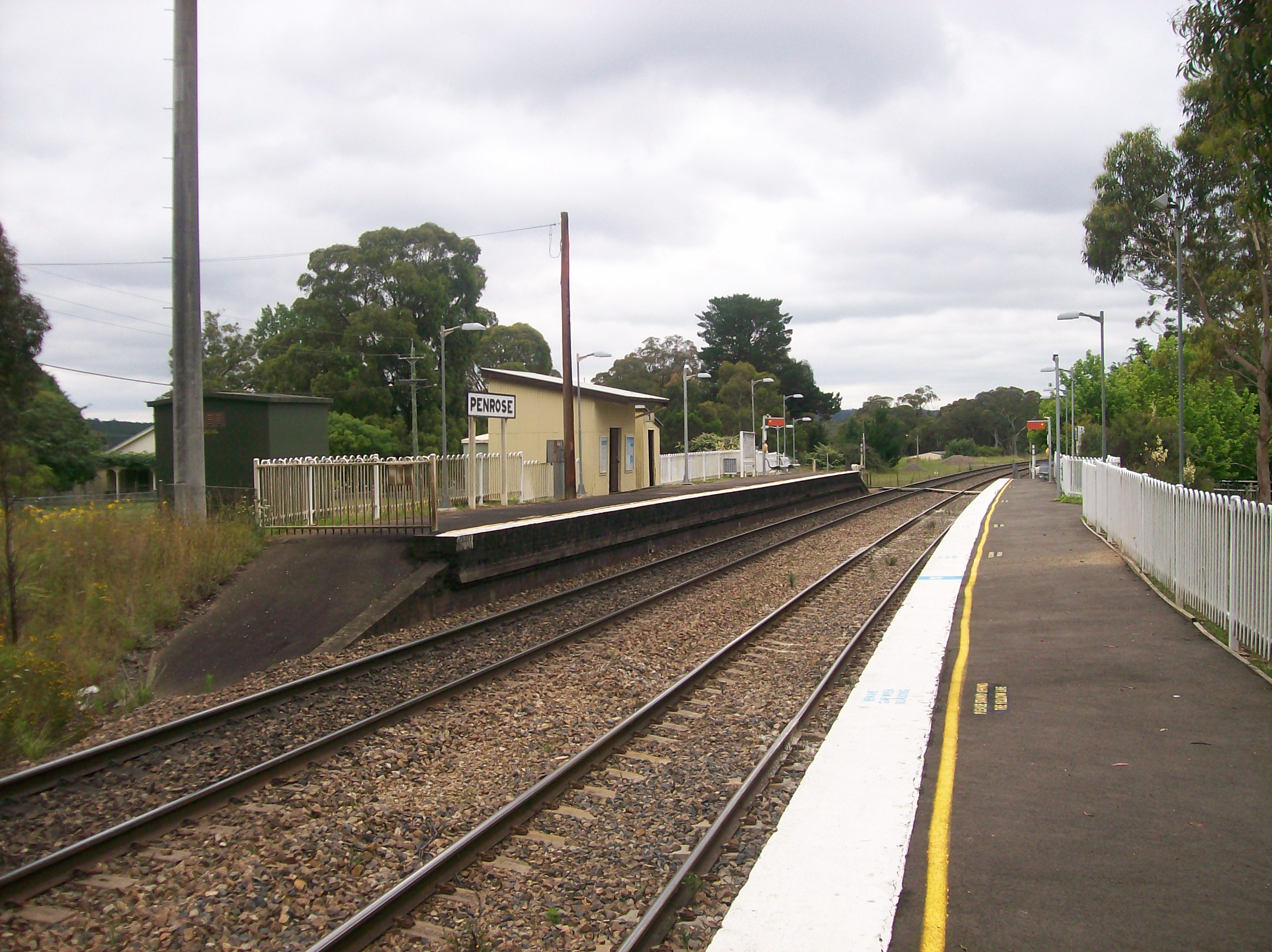
- Northbound view from Platform 2, January 2006

General information
- Location: Highland Way, Penrose; Australia
- Coordinates: 34°40′21″S 150°12′43″E
- Elevation: 647 metres (2,123 ft)
- Owner: Transport Asset Manager of New South Wales
- Operator: Sydney Trains
- Line: Main Southern
- Distance: 171.4 kilometres from Central
- Platforms: 2 side
- Tracks: 2

Construction
- Structure type: Ground

Other information
- Station code: PRS
- Website: Transport for NSW

History
- Opened: 1869
- Rebuilt: 1916
- Former names: Cables Siding (1869–1871)

Passengers
- 2023: <1 (daily) (Sydney Trains, NSW TrainLink)

Services
Preceding station	Intercity Trains	Following station
Wingello towards Goulburn	Southern Highlands Line	Bundanoon towards Central
Former services
Preceding station	Former services	Following station
Wingello towards Albury	Main Southern Line (1889–1915)	Kareela towards Sydney
Location

Penrose railway station is located on the Main Southern line in New South Wales, Australia. It serves the village of Penrose opening in 1869 as Cables Siding being renamed Penrose on 1 June 1871. It was relocated to its present site on 15 March 1916. Another station, Kareela, once existed between Penrose and Bundanoon.

== Platforms and services ==
Penrose has two side platforms. It is serviced by early morning and evening Sydney Trains Intercity Southern Highlands Line services travelling between Sydney Central, Campbelltown, Moss Vale and Goulburn.

During the day it is served by one NSW TrainLink road coach service in each direction between Moss Vale and Goulburn.

Platform	Line	Stopping pattern	Notes
1	SHL	services to Moss Vale, Campbelltown & Sydney Central	
2	SHL	services to Goulburn	
