= WNE =

WNE may refer to:

- Western New England University
- West Nile virus encephalitis
- Wilnecote railway station, station code WNE
- Wingello railway station, station code WNE
