= Tallong railway station =

Railway station in New South Wales, Australia

Tallong
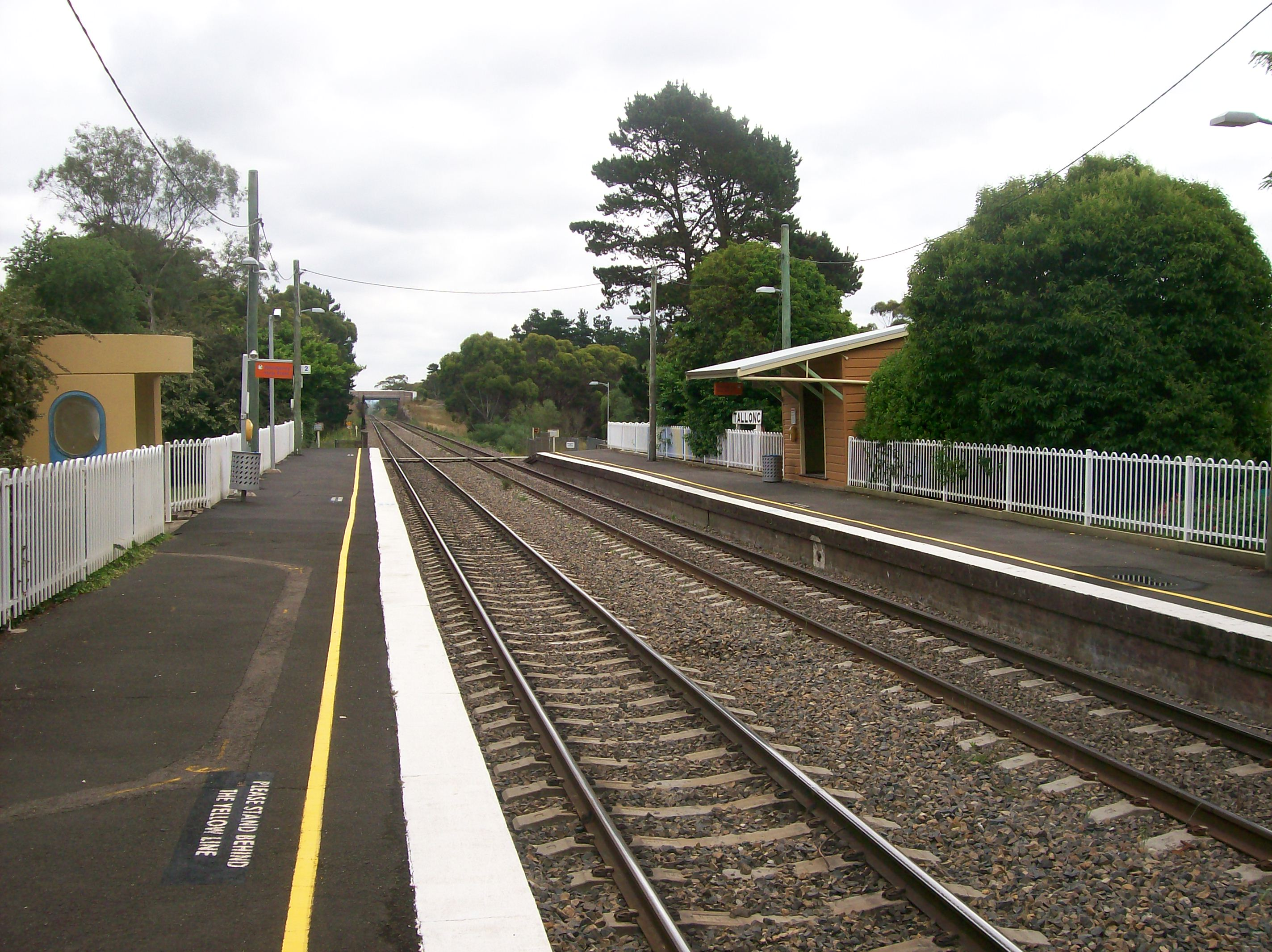
- Southbound view from Platform 2, January 2006

General information
- Location: Station Street, Tallong; Australia
- Coordinates: 34°43′06″S 150°05′10″E
- Elevation: 615 metres (2,018 ft)
- Owner: Transport Asset Manager of New South Wales
- Operator: Sydney Trains
- Line: Main Southern
- Distance: 185.38 kilometres (115.19 mi) from Central
- Platforms: 2 side
- Tracks: 2
- Connections: Bus

Construction
- Structure type: Ground

Other information
- Station code: TJG
- Website: Transport for NSW

History
- Opened: 1869
- Former names: Barbers Creek Tank (1869–1905)

Passengers
- 2023: <1 (daily) (Sydney Trains, NSW TrainLink)

Services
| Preceding station | Intercity Trains | Following station |
|---|---|---|
| Marulan towards Goulburn | Southern Highlands Line | Wingello towards Central |
Location

Tallong railway station is a heritage-listed railway station located on the Main Southern line in New South Wales, Australia. It serves the village of Tallong, opening in 1869 as a small halt named Barbers Creek Tank. A platform was opened on 16 April 1878 and it was renamed Tallong on 6 April 1905. It was added to the New South Wales State Heritage Register on 2 April 1999.

== Platforms and services ==
Tallong has two side platforms. It is serviced by early morning and evening Sydney Trains Intercity Southern Highlands Line services travelling between Sydney Central, Campbelltown, Moss Vale and Goulburn.

During the day it is served by one NSW TrainLink road coach service in each direction between Moss Vale and Goulburn.

| Platform | Line | Stopping pattern | Notes |
| 1 | SHL | services to Moss Vale, Campbelltown & Sydney Central | |
| 2 | SHL | services to Goulburn | |

== Transport links ==
Berrima Buslines operates one route to and from Tallong railway station:

- 813: to Moss Vale

== Description ==
The station complex consists of a type 7 station building constructed c. 1913) with concrete platforms. The station signs are also heritage-listed.

The station dam and reservoir was first built in 1869, rebuilt in 1888, and had the dam wall raised in 1917. The corrugated iron clad pump station had its equipment changed to oil in 1911. The dam precinct also includes cast iron Atlas Engineering water tanks on metal stands and standard metal water columns with a swing arm, situated on the western side of the railway line.

== Heritage listing ==
Tallong station and dam group is one of the very few surviving sites with a dam and associated facilities that are visible from the line and a station location. The dam itself and pump house are significant elements in the industrial heritage of the railways. The station group is a significant early group of timber buildings from the 1870s through to early this century. All are rare surviving examples.

Tallong railway station was listed on the New South Wales State Heritage Register on 2 April 1999 having satisfied the following criteria.

The place possesses uncommon, rare or endangered aspects of the cultural or natural history of New South Wales.

This item is assessed as historically rare. This item is assessed as scientifically rare. This item is assessed as arch. rare. This item is assessed as socially rare.
