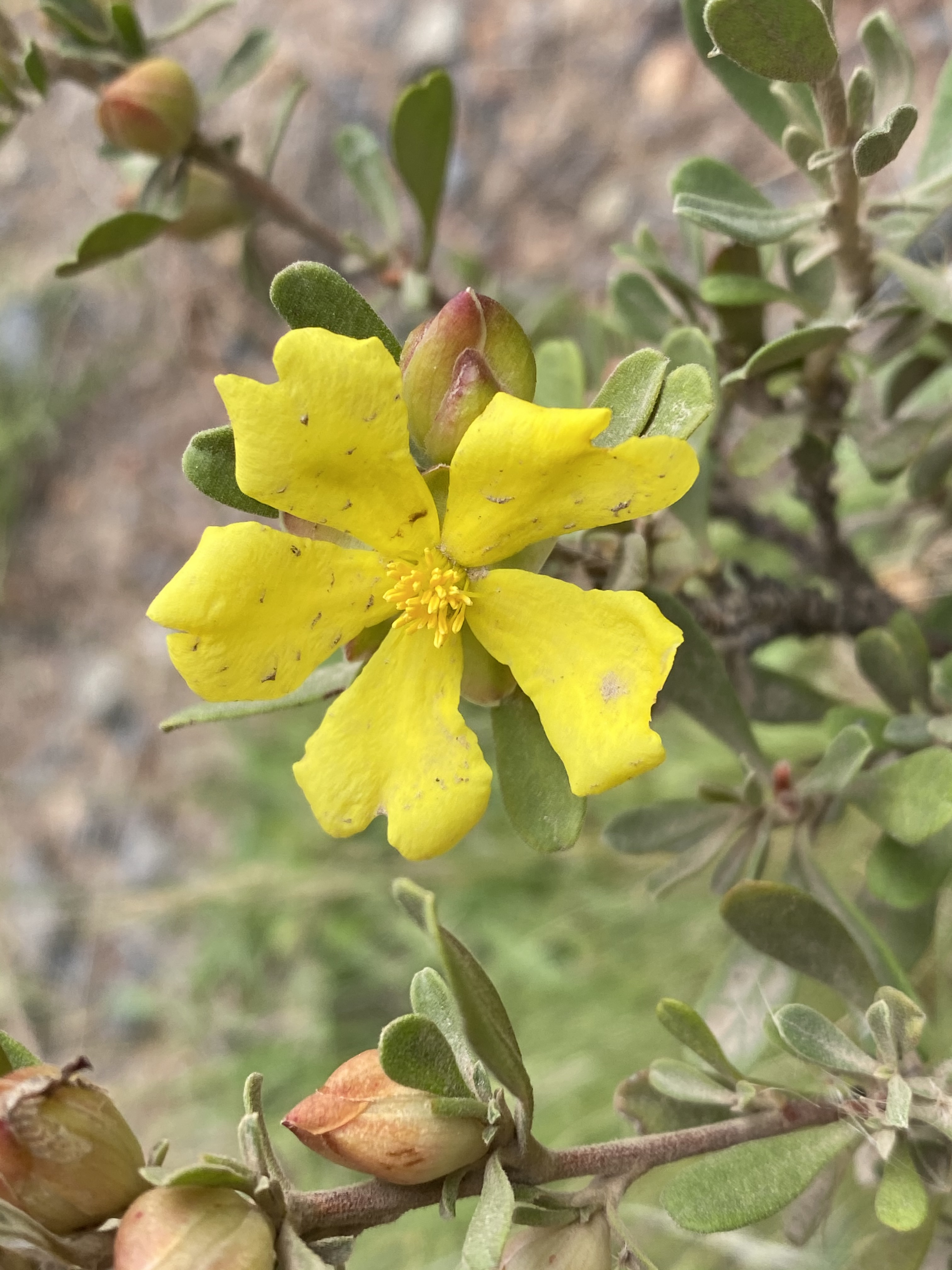
- Near Bundanoon

Scientific classification
- Kingdom: Plantae
- Clade: Tracheophytes
- Clade: Angiosperms
- Clade: Eudicots
- Order: Dilleniales
- Family: Dilleniaceae
- Genus: Hibbertia
- Species: H. praemorsa

Binomial name
- Hibbertia praemorsa Toelken

= Hibbertia praemorsa =

Species of plant

Hibbertia praemorsa is a species of flowering plant in the family Dilleniaceae and is endemic to southern New South Wales. It is a shrub with hairy foliage, oblong leaves and yellow flowers arranged singly on the ends of branches with seven to nine stamens on one side of two carpels.

== Description ==
Hibbertia praemorsa is a shrub that typically grows to a height of up to 1.3 m (4 ft 3 in) with hairy foliage. The leaves are oblong, mostly 6.5–9.5 mm (0.26–0.37 in) long, 3.0–4.5 mm (0.12–0.18 in) wide on a petiole 0.2–0.4 mm (0.0079–0.0157 in) long and with a tuft of hairs on the tip. The flowers are arranged singly on the ends of branches with leaf-like bracts at the base. The five sepals are joined at the base, the outer sepal lobes 6.5–9.3 mm (0.26–0.37 in) long and 1.6–2.1 mm (0.063–0.083 in) wide and the inner sepal lobes shorter but broader. The five petals are yellow, broadly egg-shaped with the narrower end towards the base, 5.1–8.8 mm (0.20–0.35 in) long and there are seven to nine stamens fused together at the base on one side of the two carpels, each carpel with two ovules. Flowering mainly occurs from October to February.

== Taxonomy ==
Hibbertia patens was first formally described in 2010 by Hellmut R. Toelken in the Journal of the Adelaide Botanic Gardens from specimens collected in Morton National Park in 1999. The specific epithet (praemorsa) means "bitten off", referring to the truncated ends of the leaves.

== Distribution and habitat ==
This hibbertia grows on steep, rocky slopes in Morton National Park, the Budawang Range and Bundanoon.

== See also ==
- List of Hibbertia species
