= Exeter, New South Wales =

Exeter
- Town
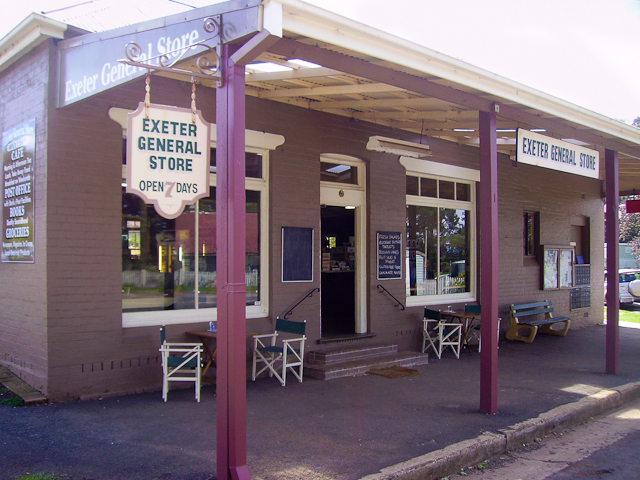
- Exeter central business district

- Coordinates: 34°37′S 150°19′E
- Country: Australia
- State: New South Wales
- Region: Southern Highlands
- LGA: Wingecarribee Shire
- Location: 145 km (90 mi) SW of Sydney; 15 km (9.3 mi) SW of Moss Vale; 61 km (38 mi) E of Goulburn; 30 km (19 mi) W of Robertson

Government
  - State electorate: Goulburn
  - Federal division: Whitlam
- Elevation: 723 m (2,372 ft)

Population
  - Total: 419 (UCL 2021)
- Postcode: 2579
- County: Camden
- Parish: Sutton Forest
Localities around Exeter
Sutton Forest	Sutton Forest	Werai
Canyonleigh	Exeter	Werai
Penrose	Bundanoon	Meryla

Exeter (/ɛksɪtər/) is a village in the Southern Highlands district of New South Wales, Australia, in Wingecarribee Shire. It has a station on the Main Southern railway line south of Sydney.

== History ==
The village was founded by James Badgery, who was born near the County Town of Exeter in Devon, England. He arrived in New South Wales in 1799, and by 1812 was operating ‘Exeter Farms’ near Bringelly. His fortunes prospered and he explored further south arriving in what is now Exeter in 1819. In 1821 Badgery took up a 500-acre land grant on the site of the present village calling the new property Spring Grove. His son Henry continued expansion in the locality and by 1841 there was a flourishing community on the various Badgery properties. Eleven households with 79 people appear on the NSW Census of that year. Their principal property, Vine Lodge, accommodated 33 residents, including 13 convicts and ex-convicts. Following the subdivision of Vine Lodge around 1888, the name of Exeter came into being in 1890 for the present village.

There was a railway accident at Exeter in fog on a single line on 13 March 1914, killing 14 people, when the Temora Mail collided with the locomotive of a goods train which had not completed backing into a siding to allow the Mail train to pass. This is NSW's third worst railway accident.

== Population ==
At the 2016 census, Exeter had a population of 949. At the 2021 census, there were 1,087 people living at Exeter.

== Heritage listings ==
Exeter has a number of heritage-listed sites, including:

- Main Southern railway: Exeter railway station

== School ==
Schools in Exeter:

- Exeter Public School
