= Bundanoon railway station =

Railway station in New South Wales, Australia

Bundanoon
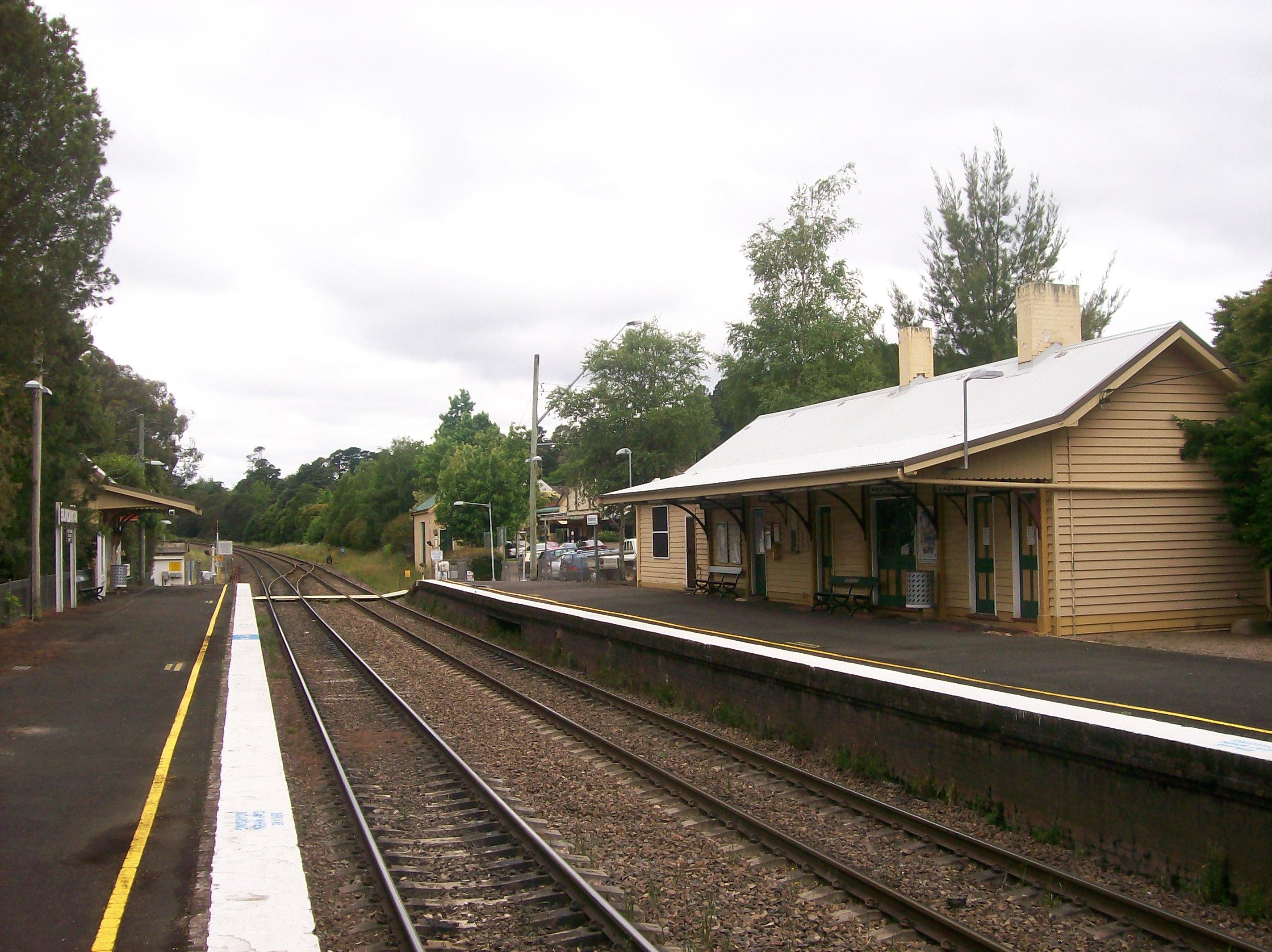
- Northbound view from Platform 1, January 2006

General information
- Location: Railway Avenue, Bundanoon; Australia
- Coordinates: 34°39′22″S 150°17′57″E
- Elevation: 672 metres (2,205 ft)
- Owner: Transport Asset Manager of New South Wales
- Operator: Sydney Trains
- Line: Main Southern
- Distance: 163.27 kilometres (101.45 mi) from Central
- Platforms: 2 side
- Tracks: 2
- Connections: Bus

Construction
- Structure type: Ground

Other information
- Station code: BUN
- Website: Transport for NSW

History
- Opened: 6 August 1868
- Former names: Jordans Crossing (1868–1878); Jordans Siding (1878–1881)

Passengers
- 2025: 6,273 (year); 17 (daily) (Sydney Trains, NSW TrainLink)

Services
| Preceding station | Intercity Trains | Following station |
|---|---|---|
| Penrose towards Goulburn | Southern Highlands Line | Exeter towards Central |
| Preceding station | NSW TrainLink | Following station |
| Goulburn towards Griffith or Canberra | NSW TrainLink Southern Line Griffith and Canberra Xplorers | Moss Vale towards Sydney |
Former services
| Preceding station | Former services | Following station |
|---|---|---|
| Kareela towards Albury | Main Southern Line (1889–1915) | Exeter towards Sydney |
Location

Bundanoon railway station is a heritage-listed railway station on the Main Southern line in New South Wales, Australia. It serves the small town of Bundanoon. It was added to the New South Wales State Heritage Register on 2 April 1999.

== History ==
The station opened on 6 August 1868 as Jordans Crossing, being renamed Jordans Siding in 1878 and finally Bundanoon in 1881.

The station has a signal box on platform 2 which controls a set of points just to the north of the station. Until the 2005 timetable one afternoon train a day terminated using this setup, the train arriving on platform 1 using the set of points, and departing back towards Campbelltown. This practice was discontinued, the signal box and points closed and the route curtailed to end at Moss Vale.

Bundanoon station celebrated 150 years since it opened on Sunday 5 August 2018.

== Platforms and services ==
Bundanoon has two side platforms. It is serviced by early morning and evening Sydney Trains Intercity Southern Highlands Line services travelling between Sydney Central, Campbelltown, Moss Vale and Goulburn.

During the day the station is served by a NSW TrainLink road coach service from Wollongong and another operating from Moss Vale to Goulburn.

It is also serviced by NSW TrainLink Xplorer long-distance services from Sydney to Canberra & Griffith. This station is a request stop for this service, so the train stops only if passengers booked to board/alight here.

| Platform | Line | Stopping pattern | Notes |
| 1 | SHL | services to Moss Vale, Campbelltown & Sydney Central | |
| 1 | Southern Region | services to Sydney Central | request stop (booked passengers only) |
| 2 | SHL | services to Goulburn | |
| 2 | Southern Region | services to Canberra & Griffith | request stop (booked passengers only) |

== Transport links ==
Berrima Buslines operate one route via Bundanoon station:

- 813: Moss Vale to Tallong

== Description ==
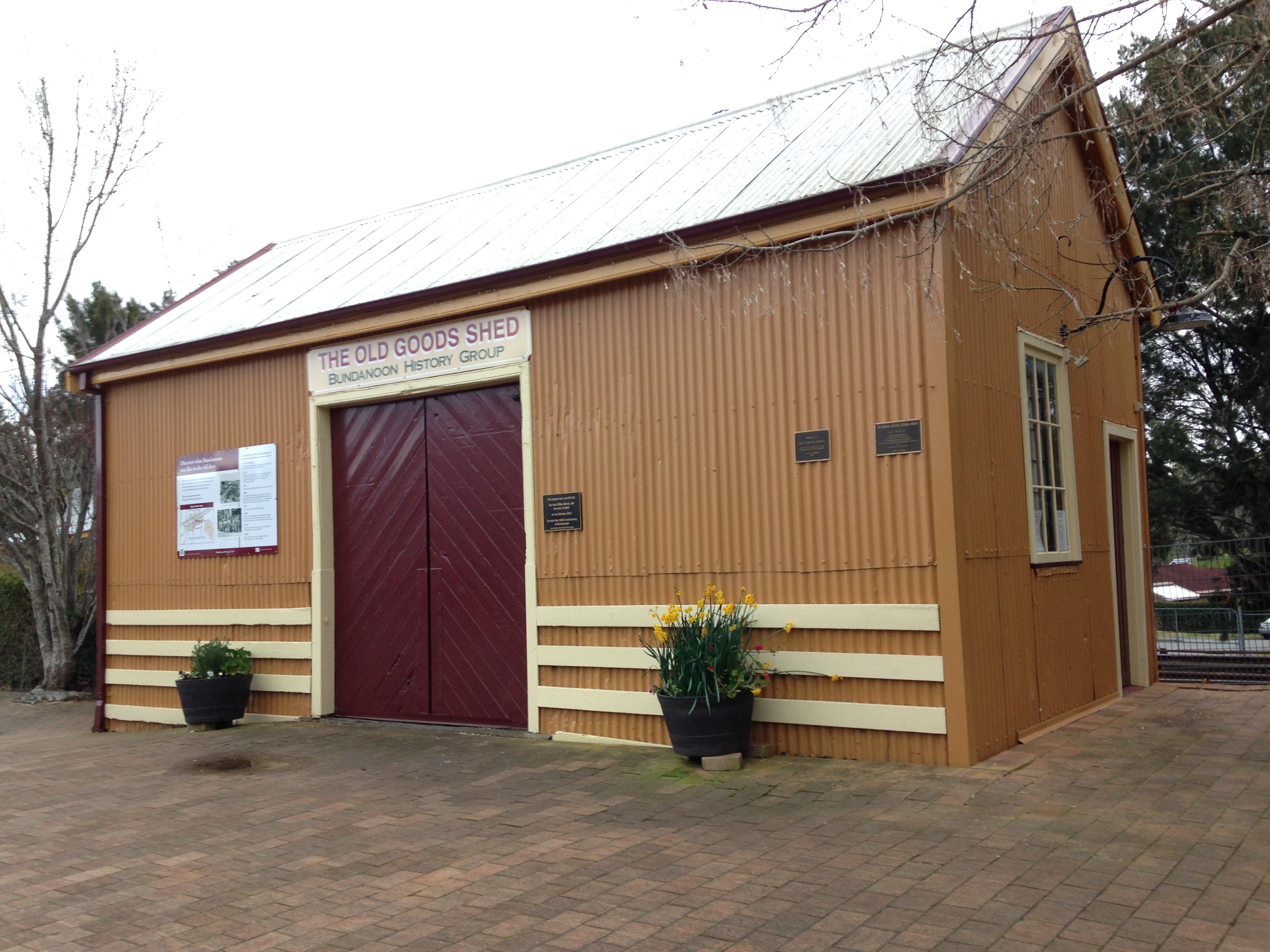
The Old Goods Shed, home of the Bundanoon History Group

The station complex consists of a timber station building on the northbound platform (c. 1915) and another timber station building of an initial island side building design (c. 1910) with brick-faced platforms. It also contains a corrugated iron former toilet and shed (c. 1910), timber skillion roofed signal box (1914) and timber parcels office, all situated on the platforms, and a 30'x15' corrugated iron goods shed of a side shed design.

== Heritage listing ==
Bundanoon station and yard group is an excellent example of an early 20th century station complex with remnants of the early period of construction including the unusual and rare small goods shed. The original buildings for a small country location were expanded to take advantage of the holiday market in the early years of the century. The length of platforms indicate the relative importance of the station and the need for longer distance trains to stop here. The location of the site at a major intersection in the village of Bundanoon makes it an important visual element in the historic townscape that contributes significantly to the visual importance of the town. All of the listed elements contribute to the group and give a clear indication of the operation and style of a c.1913 station group.

Bundanoon railway station was listed on the New South Wales State Heritage Register on 2 April 1999.
