= Margaret Jeffrey =

Australian police officer

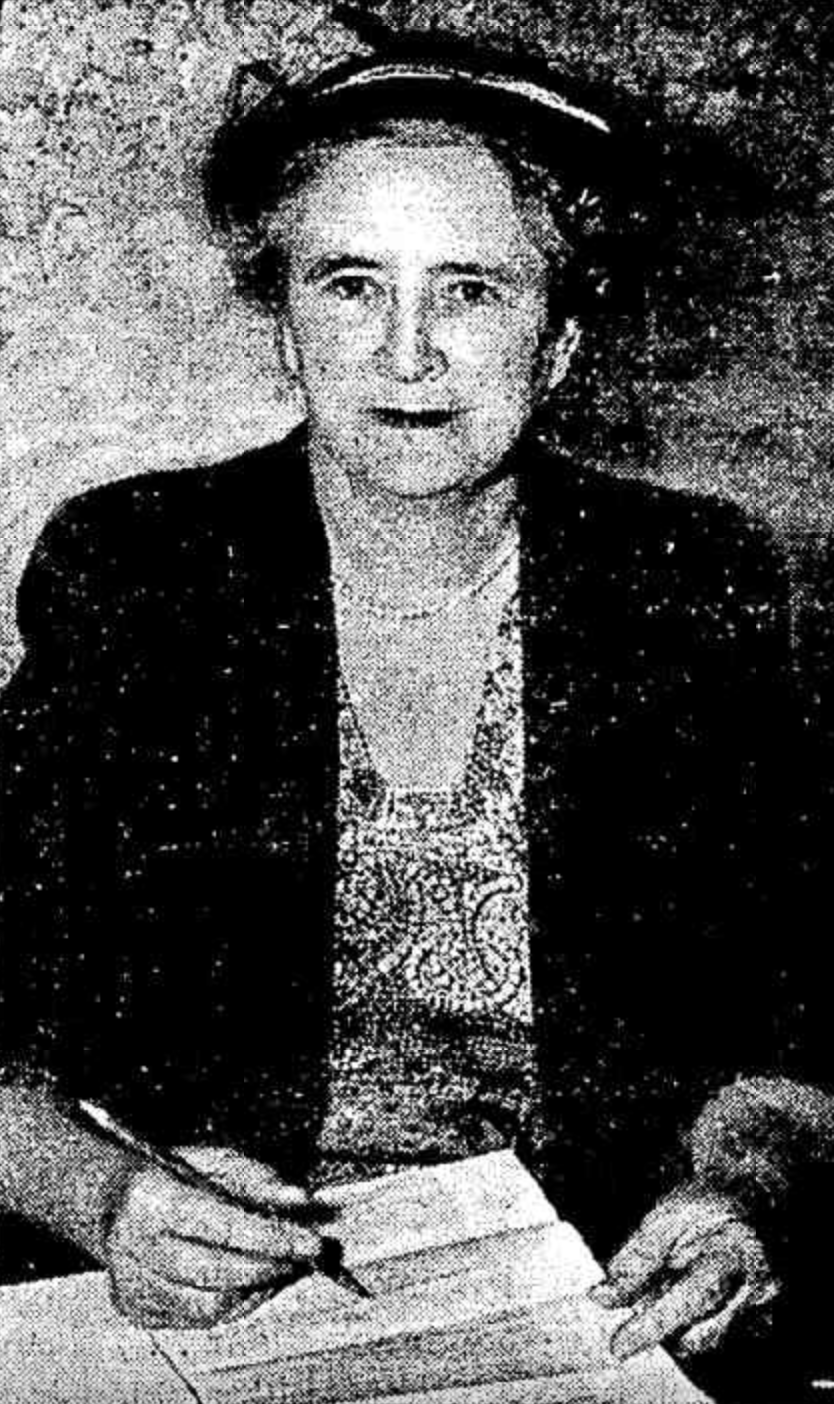
Margaret Jeffrey, Chief of Women Police, 1954

Margaret Lilian Jeffrey (née Hines; 14 July 1896 – 24 June 1977) was an Australian police officer who was one of the first women to hold high rank in the New South Wales Police.

Jeffrey was born in Bundanoon, New South Wales, to Susan (née Brody) and Thomas Hines; her father was a farmer. She married Walter Jeffrey in 1919, and moved to Sydney when he joined the police. After his death in 1931, she successfully petitioned the police commissioner, William MacKay, to allow her to join the force, despite being past the usual maximum age of application. Jeffrey was initially posted to the Clarence Street Police Station in inner Sydney. She was transferred to the Criminal Investigation Branch in 1935, and was "expected to concentrate her attention on the needs of women and children", taking statements from female witnesses in cases of rape, abortion, infanticide, and domestic violence. Jeffrey was promoted to special constable (1st class) in 1943, and later became one of the first women to command an entire station, serving as officer-in-charge at Burwood (1946–1947) and Campsie (1947–1949). She returned to the CIB in 1949, and was promoted to special sergeant the following year. She finished her career as Officer-in-Charge, Women Police Office (1954–1956). Jeffrey lived at Jervis Bay in retirement, where she had a small poultry farm and orchard. She died in Sydney in 1977, aged 80.
