= Wingello railway station =

Railway station in New South Wales, Australia

Wingello
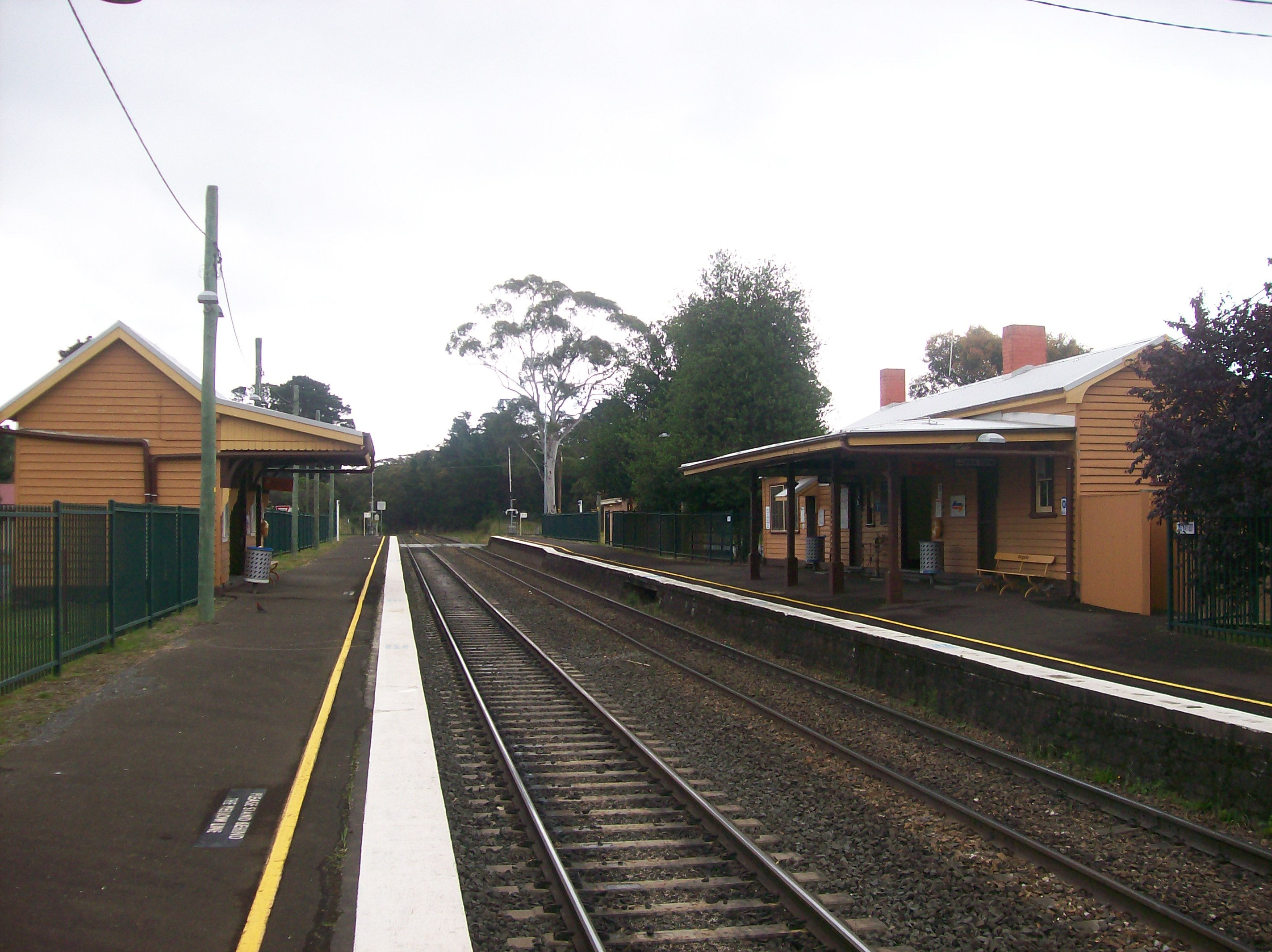
- Southbound view from Platform 2, January 2006

General information
- Location: Sydney Road, Wingello; Australia
- Coordinates: 34°41′32″S 150°09′30″E
- Elevation: 679 metres (2,228 ft)
- Owner: Transport Asset Manager of New South Wales
- Operator: Sydney Trains
- Line: Main Southern
- Distance: 177.14 kilometres (110.07 mi) from Central
- Platforms: 2 side
- Tracks: 2

Construction
- Structure type: Ground

Other information
- Station code: WNE
- Website: Transport for NSW

History
- Opened: 1 June 1871

Passengers
- 2023: <600 (year); 1–2 (daily) (Sydney Trains, NSW TrainLink)

Services
Preceding station	Intercity Trains	Following station
Tallong towards Goulburn	Southern Highlands Line	Penrose towards Central
Location

Wingello railway station is a heritage-listed railway station on the Main Southern line in New South Wales, Australia. It serves the village of Wingello. It was added to the New South Wales State Heritage Register on 2 April 1999.

== History ==
It opened on 1 June 1871 as a siding, with a station built in 1882.

== Platforms and services ==
Wingello has two side platforms. It is serviced by early morning and evening Sydney Trains Intercity Southern Highlands Line services travelling between Sydney Central, Campbelltown, Moss Vale and Goulburn.

During the day, it is served by one NSW TrainLink road coach service in each direction between Moss Vale and Goulburn.

Other bus services during the day include two bus routes operated by Berrima Buslines, the first service is at 7:35am, route 813 to Moss Vale. Route 813 then returns at 4:35pm for a service to Tallong Park

During trackwork, this station is served by replacement bus service SH100 between Moss Vale and Goulburn.

Platform	Line	Stopping pattern	Notes
1	SHL	services to Moss Vale, Campbelltown & Sydney Central	
2	SHL	services to Goulburn	

== Description ==
The station complex includes two timber station buildings: a third-class building of type 4 design (1871) and a timber island/side building (1915) with shelter shed and a brick-faced platform (1915). A reverse skillion-roofed timber signal box (1915) and skillion roofed out of shed also form part of the precinct. The station plantings, lights and furniture are also included in the heritage listing.

== Heritage listing ==
Wingello is an excellent example of a small country location with both platforms and buildings intact with timber buildings and a good collection of miscellaneous supporting structures. It is a rare example where both buildings survive and is typical of many similar arrangements which have now been removed. It is on a section of line where a number of early buildings survive to demonstrate early construction techniques and styles of building. The 1871 building is one of the earliest surviving buildings on that section of line.

Wingello railway station was listed on the New South Wales State Heritage Register on 2 April 1999.
