= Exeter railway station, New South Wales =

Railway station in New South Wales, Australia

Exeter
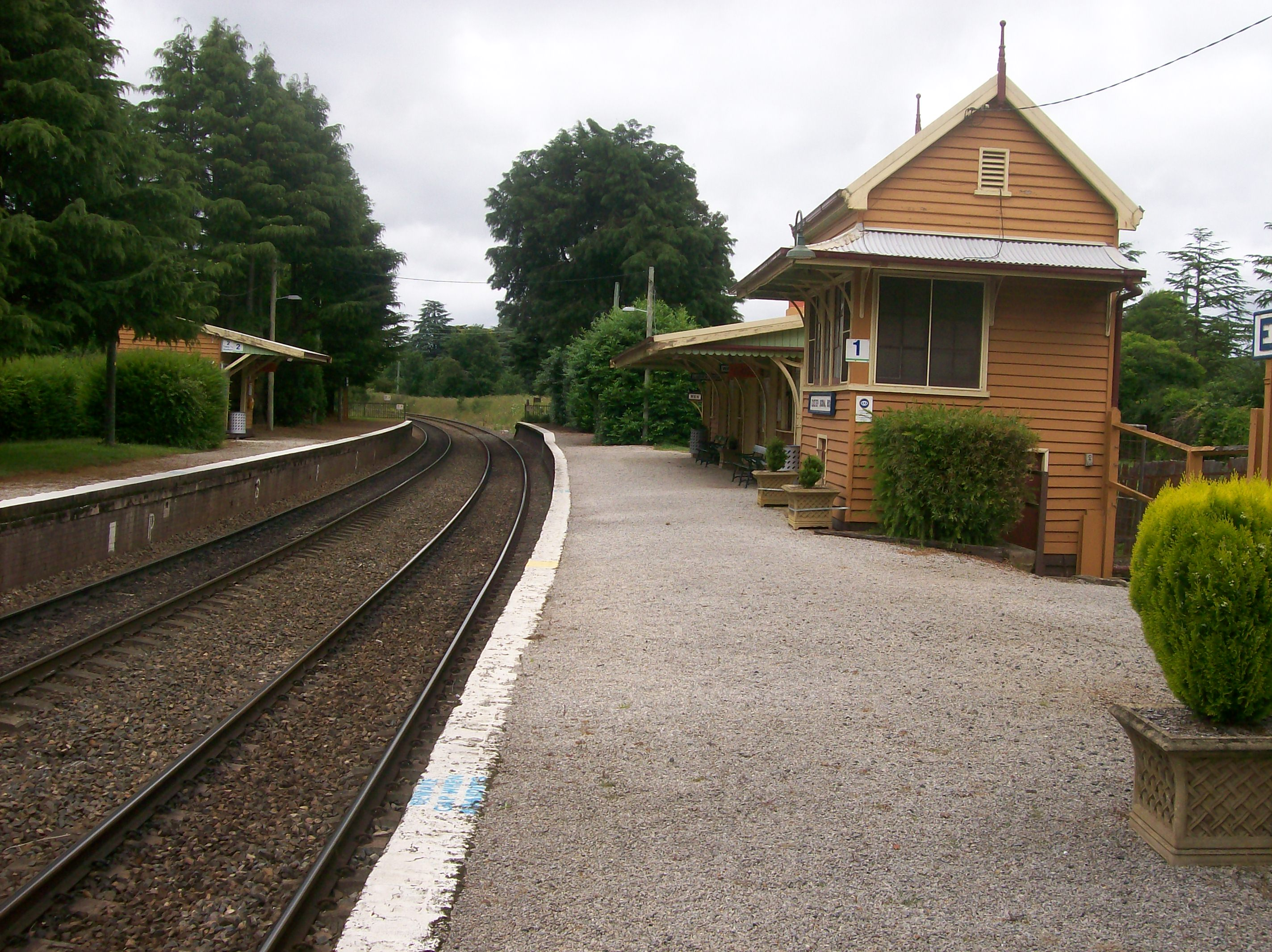
- Southbound view from Platform 1

General information
- Location: Bundanoon Road, Exeter; Australia
- Coordinates: 34°36′49″S 150°19′02″E
- Elevation: 721 metres (2,365 ft)
- Owner: Transport Asset Manager of New South Wales
- Operator: Sydney Trains
- Line: Main Southern
- Distance: 155.88 kilometres from Central
- Platforms: 2 side
- Tracks: 2

Construction
- Structure type: Ground

Other information
- Station code: EXT
- Website: Transport for NSW

History
- Opened: 1878
- Former names: Badgerys Siding (1878–1890)

Passengers
- 2025: 1,907 (year); 5 (daily) (Sydney Trains, NSW TrainLink)

Services
Preceding station	Intercity Trains	Following station
Bundanoon towards Goulburn	Southern Highlands Line	Moss Vale towards Central
Former services
Preceding station	Former services	Following station
Bundanoon towards Albury	Main Southern Line (1883–1969)	Werai towards Sydney
Location
- Location within New South Wales

Exeter railway station is a heritage-listed railway station on the Main Southern line in New South Wales, Australia. It serves the village of Exeter. It was added to the New South Wales State Heritage Register on 2 April 1999.

== History ==
It opened in 1878 as Badgerys Siding, and was renamed to Exeter on 12 August 1890.

== Platforms and services ==
Exeter has two side platforms. It is serviced by early morning and evening Sydney Trains Intercity Southern Highlands Line services travelling between Sydney Central, Campbelltown, Moss Vale and Goulburn.

During the day the station is served by NSW TrainLink road coach services from Bundanoon to Wollongong and Moss Vale to Goulburn.

Platform	Line	Stopping pattern	Notes
1	Southern Highlands Line	services to Moss Vale, Campbelltown & Sydney Central	
2	Southern Highlands Line	services to Goulburn	

== Description ==
The historic Exeter station complex includes a timber station building with a skillion roof (1891), a timber waiting shed on platform 2 (1891), and an additional timber station building dating from 1915, with brick-faced platforms. It also includes the two storey gabled single box on platform 2 dating from c. 1897, the corrugated iron lamp room, signals, platform plantings and platform signs.

== Heritage listing ==
Exeter is one of the best small station complexes in New South Wales. It has a rare on-station two level signal box (another is located at Katoomba railway station) and planting near the station.

The location of the group within the small and historic village of Exeter adds to both the importance of the site and the quality of the town. The site has a strong visual impact on the town and streetscape.

Exeter railway station was listed on the New South Wales State Heritage Register on 2 April 1999.
