= Refuge siding =

Dead-end siding off a running train line

A refuge siding is a single-ended, or dead-end, siding off a running line, which may be used to temporarily accommodate a train so that another one can pass it. For example, a refuge siding might be used by a slow goods train to allow a fast passenger train to pass. It is similar in concept to a passing loop but is connected to the main line at only one end, rather than both ends.

== Japan ==
On the Japanese railway network, 8 refuge sidings (known locally as a form of switchback) remain in day-to-day use – Obasute Station, Hatsukari Station, Nihongi Station, Tsubojiri Station, Shingai Station, Kuwanaohara Signal Box, Takiyama Signal Box and Nakazaike Signal Box – while 48 former refuge sidings, now converted into conventional passing loops or abandoned, are attested. They are mostly used by stopping passenger trains and freight trains, especially in cases where express trains are scheduled to pass.

== Australia ==
- Fish River – up and down refuge sidings on double track
- Otford – up and down refuge sidings on double track
- Berry – refuge siding
- Dombarton up and down refuge sidings
- Capertee refuge and goods sidings
- Cowan – up refuge sidings on double track converted to loop.

Sometimes refuge sidings were needed where there were steep ramps on the line. For example, at Gresford railway station in New South Wales, the gradient was so steep that a refuge siding was required at the station in case some of the wagons or coaches of a train had to be left behind so that it could climb the hill.

In British and Australian practice at least, it was common to refer to such sidings as an "Up refuge siding" or "Down refuge siding" depending on the orientation of the siding in relation to the direction of travel.

== See also ==
- Settle–Carlisle line, where there used to be many refuge sidings in the age of steam.
