= Bundanoon, New South Wales =

Bundanoon
- Town
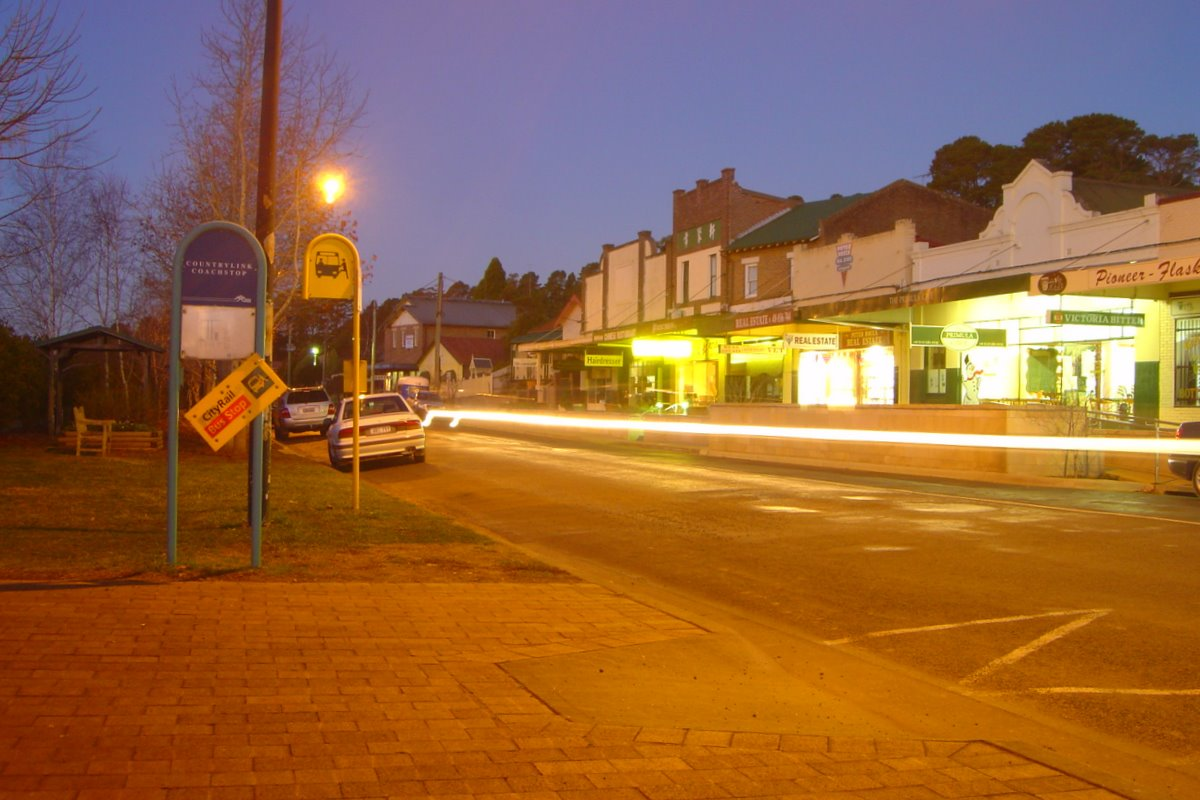
- Bundanoon Town Centre at dusk

- Coordinates: 34°39′S 150°18′E
- Country: Australia
- State: New South Wales
- LGA: Wingecarribee Shire
- Location: 150 km (93 mi) SW of Sydney; 22 km (14 mi) SW of Moss Vale; 57 km (35 mi) E of Goulburn; 83 km (52 mi) WSW of Wollongong

Government
  - State electorate: Goulburn
  - Federal division: Whitlam
- Elevation: 675 m (2,215 ft)

Population
  - Total: 2,642 (UCL 2021)
- Postcode: 2578
- County: Camden
- Parish: Sutton Forest
- Mean max temp: 28 °C (82 °F)
- Mean min temp: 2 °C (36 °F)
- Annual rainfall: 1,155.6 mm (45.50 in)
Localities around Bundanoon
	Exeter
Penrose	Bundanoon	Meryla
	Wingello

Bundanoon /ˈbʌndəˌnuːn/ is a town in the Southern Highlands of New South Wales, Australia, in Wingecarribee Shire, on Gandangarra and Dharawal Country (where these two countries meet). It is an Aboriginal name meaning "place of deep gullies" and was formerly known as Jordan's Crossing. Bundanoon is colloquially known as Bundy/Bundi.

Bundanoon, like its fellow Southern Villages of the Southern Highlands, has had a boom-and-bust economic cycle. The town became a well-known tourist destination early in the 20th century; its picturesqueness and the scenery of what is now Morton National Park, combined with being served by the railway network, made it a pleasant and convenient holiday area for city dwellers who could not afford more expensive accommodations at the popular Blue Mountains resort area. By the 1950s, however, changes in lifestyle, particularly the affordability of the motor car, gave city dwellers more options and Bundanoon declined.

The Sydney real estate boom of the early 21st century made Bundanoon an affordable haven within commuting distance of the city. Property values increased several-fold, and houses in Bundanoon were selling for over a million dollars by 2007.

Several houses in the town were destroyed by a bushfire in January 2020.

== Population ==
At the 2021 census there were 2,642 people residing in Bundanoon. The town's population was significantly older than the general population: their median age was 60 years, 22 years older than the national median age of 38. Children aged under 15 made up 11.4% of the population (less than the national average of 18.2%) and people aged 65 years and over made up 42.2% of the population (more than double the national average of 17.2%). This is reflected in the low workforce participation, with only 1,063 of the 2,642 people reporting themselves as being in the labour force. Of these, 47.1% were employed full-time, 40.5% were employed part-time and 2.7% were unemployed. 73.5% of people living in Bundanoon were born in Australia; the next most common countries of birth were England 9.6%, New Zealand 1.9%, and Germany 0.9%. 92.2% of people only spoke English at home. The most common responses for religion were No Religion 40.7%, Anglican 22.4% and Catholic 15.9%.

The 2016 census recorded 2,536 people living in Bundanoon. The town's population was significantly older than the general population: their median age was 57 years, 19 years older than the national median age of 38. Children aged under 15 made up 13.7% of the population (less than the national average of 18.7%) and people aged 65 years and over made up 36.7% of the population (more than double the national average of 15.8%). This is reflected in the low workforce participation, with only 984 of the 2,536 people reporting themselves as being in the labour force. Of these, 49.1% were employed full-time, 42.1% were employed part-time and 4.3% were unemployed. 76.2% of people living in Bundanoon were born in Australia; the next most common countries of birth were England 9.1%, New Zealand 1.7%, and Germany and Scotland 0.8%. 92.7% of people only spoke English at home. The most common responses for religion were No Religion 29.9%, Anglican 28% and Catholic 18.2%.

== Annual events ==
- Brigadoon Highland Gathering – every April (established 1977) – attracts Scottish participants and tourists from around the world.
- Garden Ramble – every October (established 1996)
- Bundanoon hosts the Sydney Gilbert & Sullivan Opera every spring over 1 weekend. Performances are a sellout at the Soldiers' Memorial Hall and are a much loved annual event.

== Churches ==
Anglican: Part of the Sutton Forest parish. In 1879, Holy Trinity Anglican church was built on its present site. (The timber church was destroyed by bushfire in December 1904; rebuilt in stone in 1905.)

Catholic: Part of the parish of St Paul's in Moss Vale. St Brigid's Catholic Church was built in 1895. Prior to that, Roman Catholic services were conducted at Sutton Forest.

Uniting: Part of the Moss Vale–Bundanoon–Robertson parish.

By 1870 the Primitive Methodist Church was established on the corner where the Soldiers' Memorial Hall now stands. The Primitive Methodists moved to a new building in 1885 (now the Uniting Church) and leased the original site to shop owners.

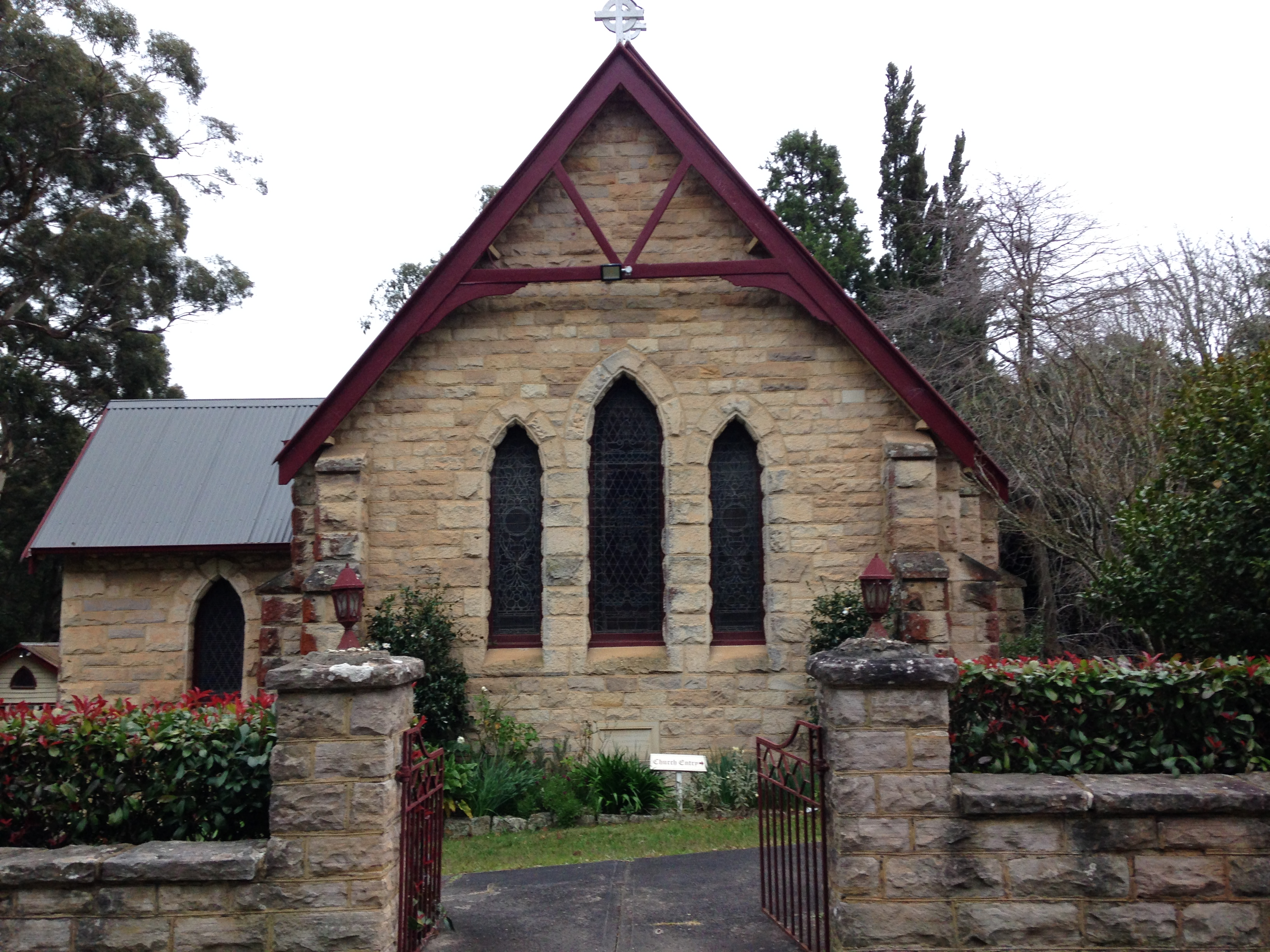
Holy Trinity Anglican Church

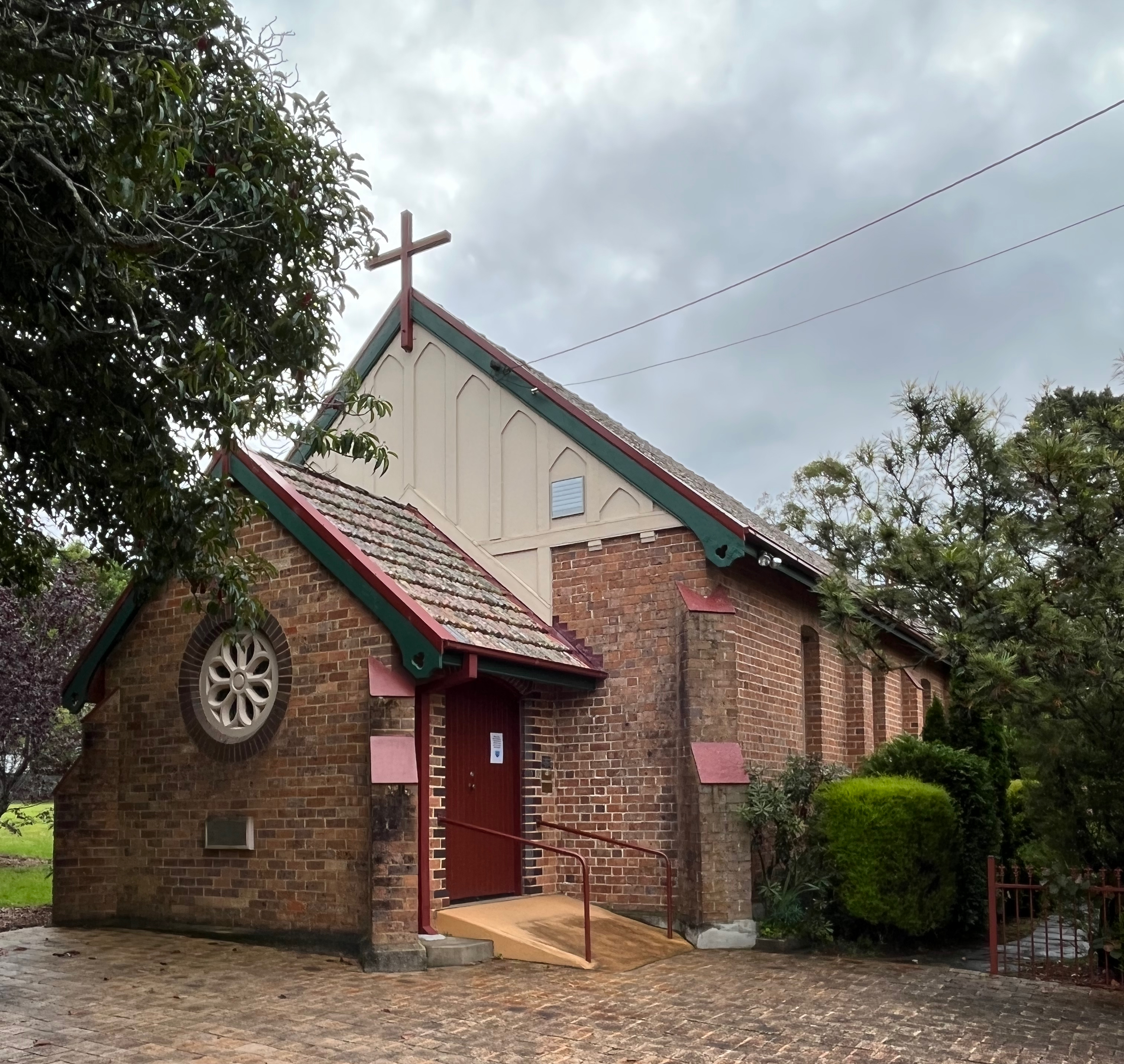
St Brigid's Catholic Church

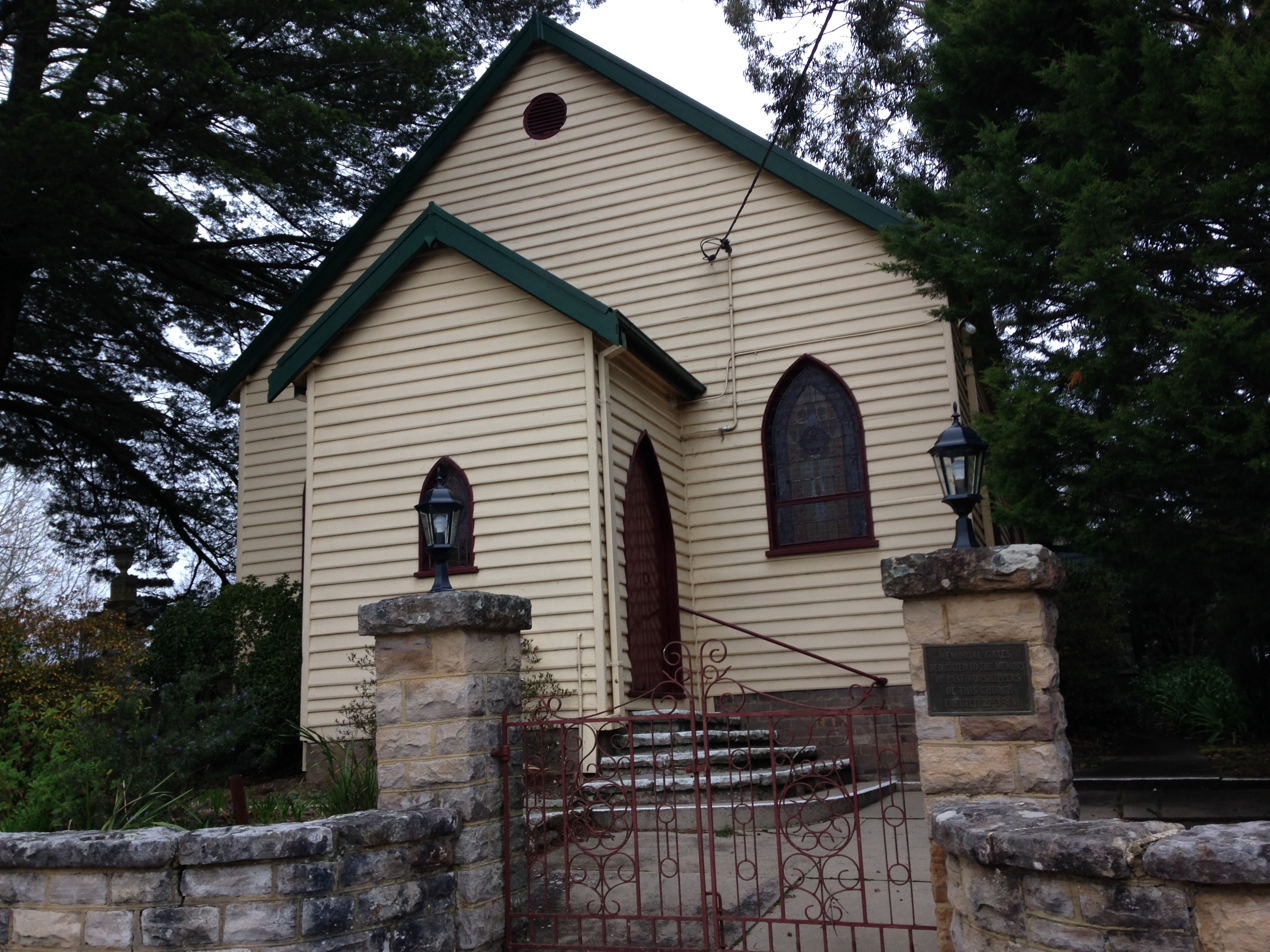
Uniting Church

== Other places of worship ==
Theravada Buddhist: Santi Forest Monastery is at 100 Coalmines Rd, Bundanoon. Santi Forest vihara is a Buddhist Nuns' hermitage meditation and contemplative monastery, a place of practice for Bhikkhunī nuns in the Theravada Forest tradition of Buddhism.

== School ==
Bundanoon Public School was established in 1871. It had an enrolment of 190 students as at 2016, which had dropped to 160 in 2020.

The Primitive Methodist Church hall served as the first school, with Mrs Dinah Osborne as teacher. A new school of two rooms was built in 1880 and is still used as the school library.

== Transport ==
Bundanoon railway station is located on the Southern Highlands line. Most services terminate at Moss Vale, meaning Bundanoon only receives limited services. Sydney to Canberra services also stop at the station.

Local bus services are provided by Berrima Bus Lines.

On the day of the 2011 census, 4.1% of employed people travelled to work on public transport and 65.3% by car (either as driver or as passenger).

== Sport ==
- Football – Bundanoon Rebels Football Club (est 1991) enters junior and senior teams in the local Highlands competition. Soccer is the main winter sport played with 5 acres of fields provided at Ferndale Reserve.
- Cricket – Bundanoon Cricket Club enters junior cricket teams for boys and girls, and senior cricket teams, in the HDCA competition.
- Rolloff World Championships are held in Bundanoon.

== Heritage listings ==
Bundanoon has a number of heritage-listed sites, including:

- Main Southern railway: Bundanoon railway station

== History ==
The town was originally named Jordan's Crossing. The change of name for post office was gazetted in April 1881, although it had been reported as "Bundanoon township at Jordan's Crossing" when a meeting was held in 1870 to establish the public school.

=== Bundanoon History Group ===
Established in the early 1980s, the Bundanoon History Group meets once a month in The Old Goods Shed, where its collection of photographs and written records are held.

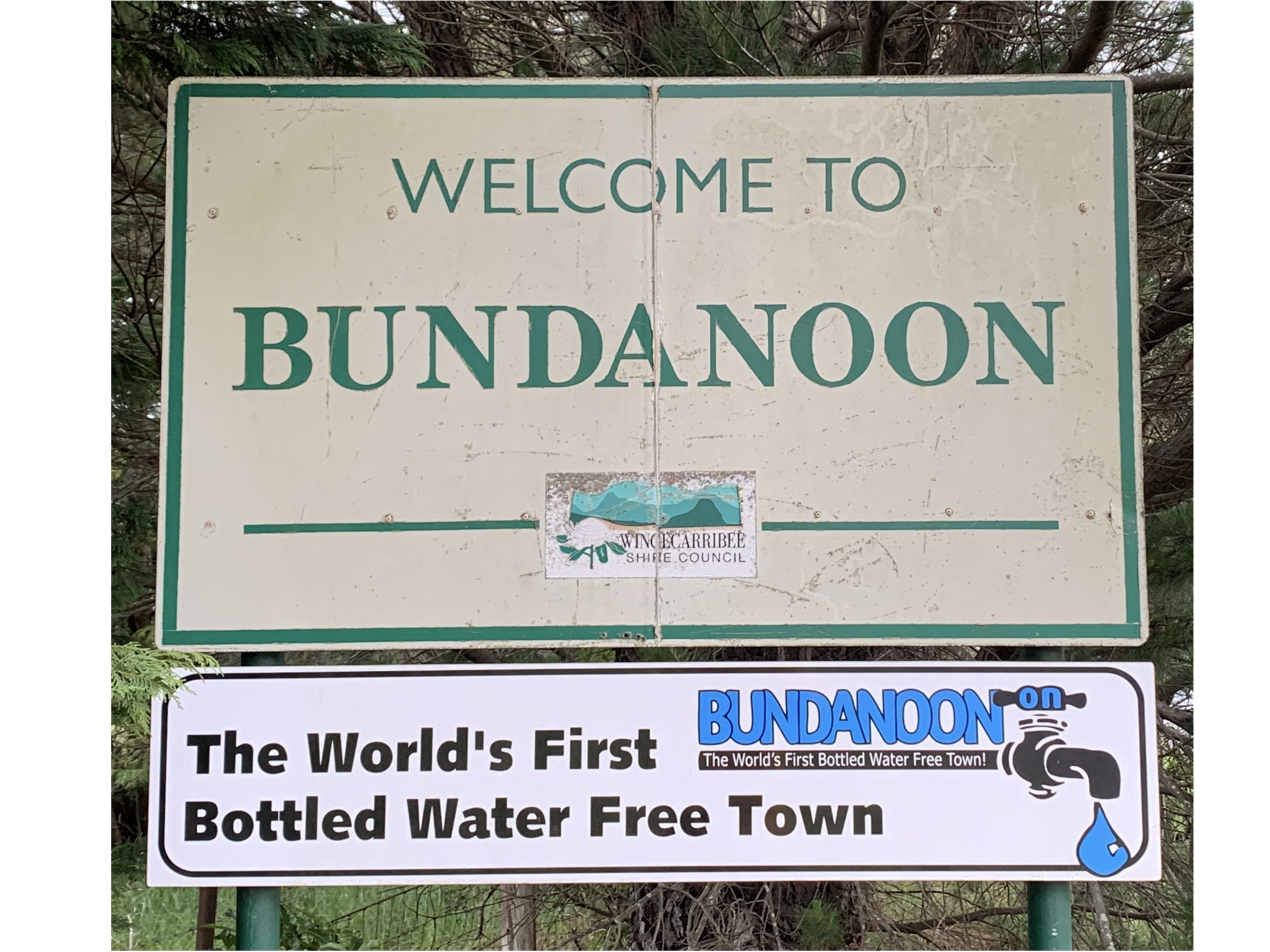
Sign welcoming people to Bundanoon

=== Ban on bottled water ===
In July 2009 "Bundy on Tap", a community initiative in Bundanoon, declared itself opposed to the sale of bottled drinking water on environmental grounds; local businesses instead committed themselves to filling re-usable bottles with tap water on request. The issue of bottled water was to protest against companies Norlex and Coca-Cola (that owns Australian bottled water brands Neverfail and Mount Franklin) extracting water from the town's groundwater.

=== 2020 Bushfire ===
In January 2020, the town was affected by a bushfire during the 2019–20 Australian bushfire season. Several homes were destroyed.

== Notable residents ==
- David Foster (born 1944), novelist
- Margaret Jeffrey (1896–1977), senior policewoman
