= Penrose, New South Wales (Wingecarribee) =

Penrose
- Town
- Coordinates: 34°40′30″S 150°12′45″E
- Country: Australia
- State: New South Wales
- Region: Southern Highlands
- LGA: Wingecarribee Shire
- Location: 153 km (95 mi) SW of Sydney; 51 km (32 mi) ENE of Goulburn; 25 km (16 mi) SW of Moss Vale

Government
  - State electorate: Goulburn
  - Federal division: Whitlam
- Elevation: 648 m (2,126 ft)

Population
  - Total: 263 (SAL 2021)
- Postcode: 2579
- County: Camden
- Parish: Mittagong
Localities around Penrose
| Canyonleigh | Canyonleigh | Bundanoon |
| Wingello | Penrose | Bundanoon |
| Wingello |

Penrose is a small town in the Southern Highlands of New South Wales, Australia, in Wingecarribee Shire. It has a station on the Main Southern railway line served by NSW TrainLink's Southern Highlands Line.

According to the 2016 census, Penrose had a population of 247. At the 2021 census, there were 263 people recorded.

Penrose also has a small general store, a cafe, rural fire brigade, a primary school and a timber mill.
