= Southern Highlands Line =

Rail service in New South Wales, Australia

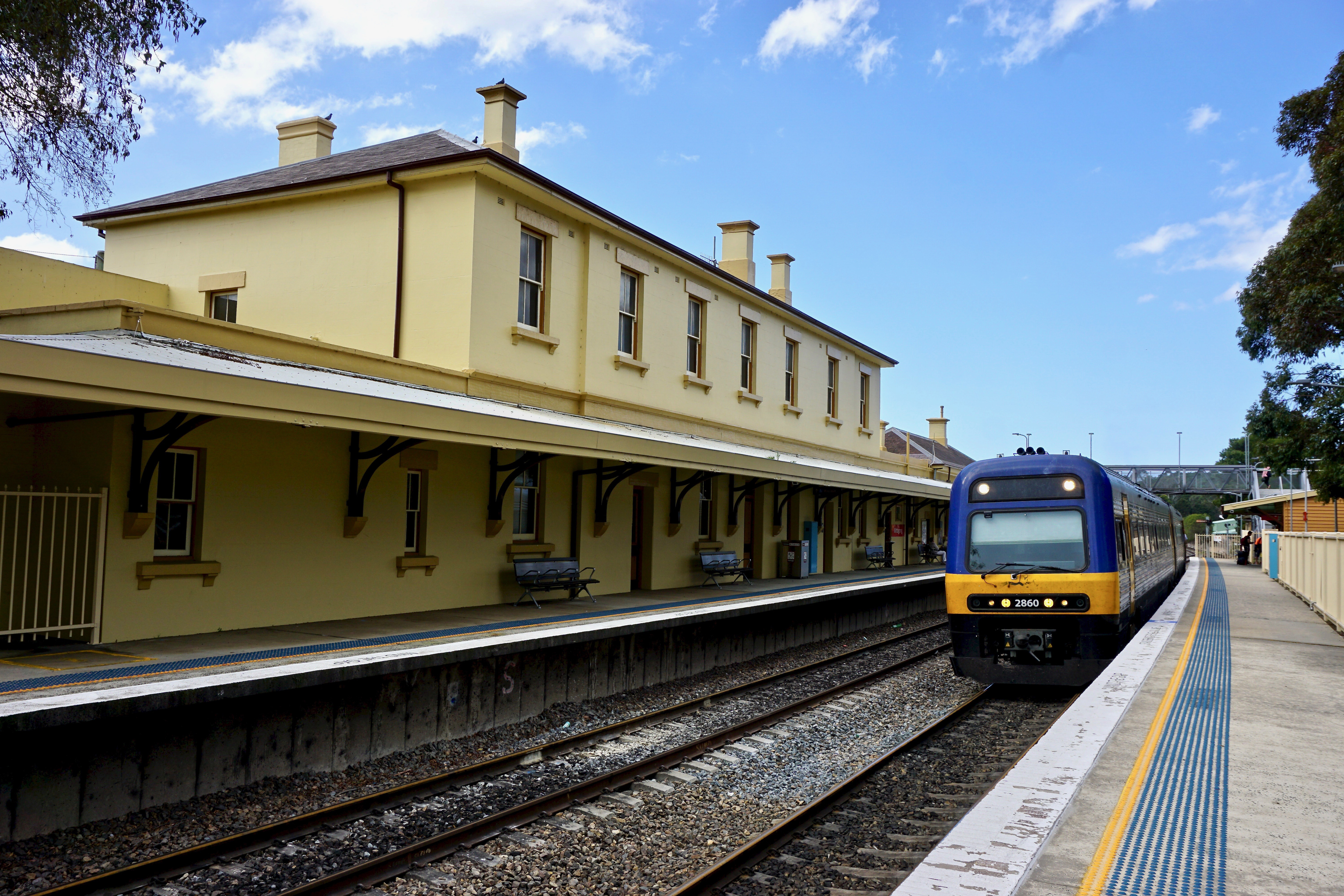
- An Endeavour railcar at Mittagong

Overview
- Service type: Intercity rail
- Locale: Macarthur, Southern Highlands and Southern Tablelands, New South Wales
- First service: 19 May 1869
- Current operator: Sydney Trains

Route
- Termini: Central; Campbelltown; Moss Vale; Goulburn
- Stops: 22
- Distance travelled: 215 km (134 mi)
- Line used: Main South

Technical
- Rolling stock: Endeavour railcar N set
- Track gauge: 1,435 mm (4 ft 8 1/2 in) standard gauge
- Track owners: Sydney Trains, ARTC
Route map
Sydney Trains intercity services
- Blue Mountains
- Central Coast & Newcastle
- Hunter
- South Coast
- Southern Highlands

The Southern Highlands Line (SHL) is an intercity rail service that services the Macarthur, Southern Highlands and Southern Tablelands regions of New South Wales. First operating in 1869, the service runs from Campbelltown across the Main Southern railway line through to Goulburn, with peak hour services extending the route to Central. The railway service operates alongside a bus route from Picton to Bowral, operating on the route of the Picton–Mittagong loop railway line, and a regional coach service from Bundanoon to Wollongong on the South Coast Line, operating on the corridor of the Unanderra–Moss Vale railway line.

One of only two routes on the Sydney Trains intercity network to run entirely on non-electrified railway lines, the Southern Highlands Line is operated with a rolling stock solely consisting of Endeavour railcars, with most services only using two cars. The service spans 169 kilometres (105 mi) of railway, making it the most extensive route on the Sydney Trains network apart from the Blue Mountains Line's Bathurst Bullet service. Despite that, the route spans only 22 stations, making it also the route with the lowest number of stops. An additional 7 stations and 79 kilometres (49 mi) of railway are traversed by Southern Highlands trains at peak hours.

== History ==
The Main South line opened in stages to Picton in 1863, Moss Vale in 1867 and Goulburn in 1869.

In 1919, a new section of line opened between Picton and Mittagong, with the original section becoming the Picton-Mittagong loop line. Originally a single track line, it was later doubled with the exception of the Picton-Mittagong loop line.

== Services ==
Route diagram of SHL

Most services operate between Campbelltown and Moss Vale with a limited number extending to Sydney Central and Goulburn. All services are operated by Sydney Trains using Endeavour railcars.

Rail replacement bus services operate between Picton and Bowral paralleling the Picton–Mittagong loop line and Bundanoon and Wollongong paralleling the Moss Vale–Unanderra line. A daytime bus service also operates between Moss Vale and Goulburn. Some stations are also served by NSW TrainLink XPT and Xplorer services from Sydney to Canberra, Griffith and Melbourne.

Up until the mid-1990s, most services on the line operated through to Sydney Central. Named trains that operated on the line included the Goulburn Day Train and Southern Highlands Express. In the late 1980s, air-conditioned HUB/RUB carriages were introduced. These would later be joined by Budd and Tulloch carriages and DEB railcars.

In 1994, all were replaced by Endeavour railcars. Most services were altered to operate only as far north as Campbelltown connecting with Sydney Trains electric services to Sydney.

As of 2014–15, the Southern Highlands Line experiences significantly worse peak hour on-time running performance than other suburban and intercity lines.

== Rolling stock ==
- New South Wales Endeavour Railcar N set 2 car DMUs
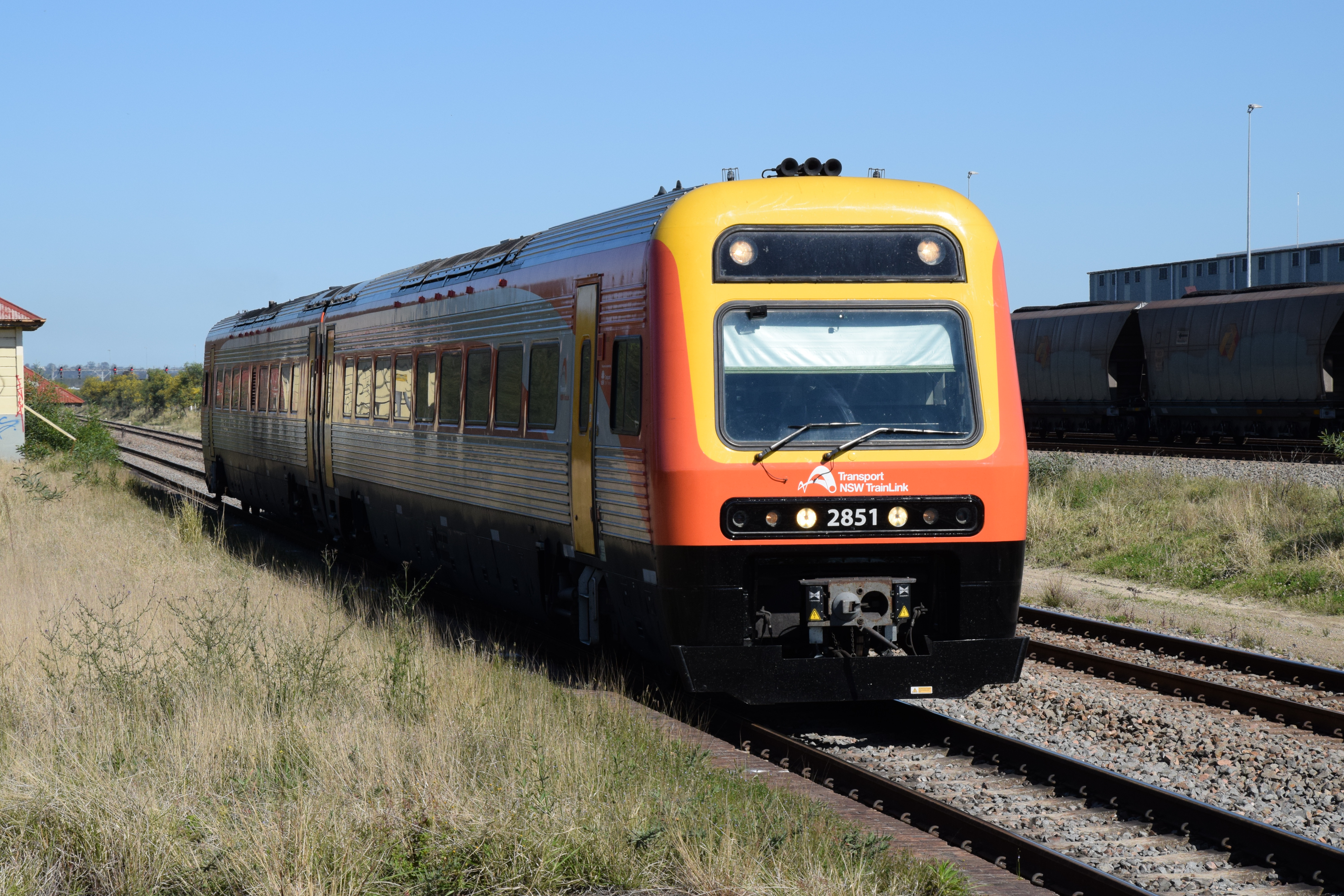
Endeavour Railcar N set

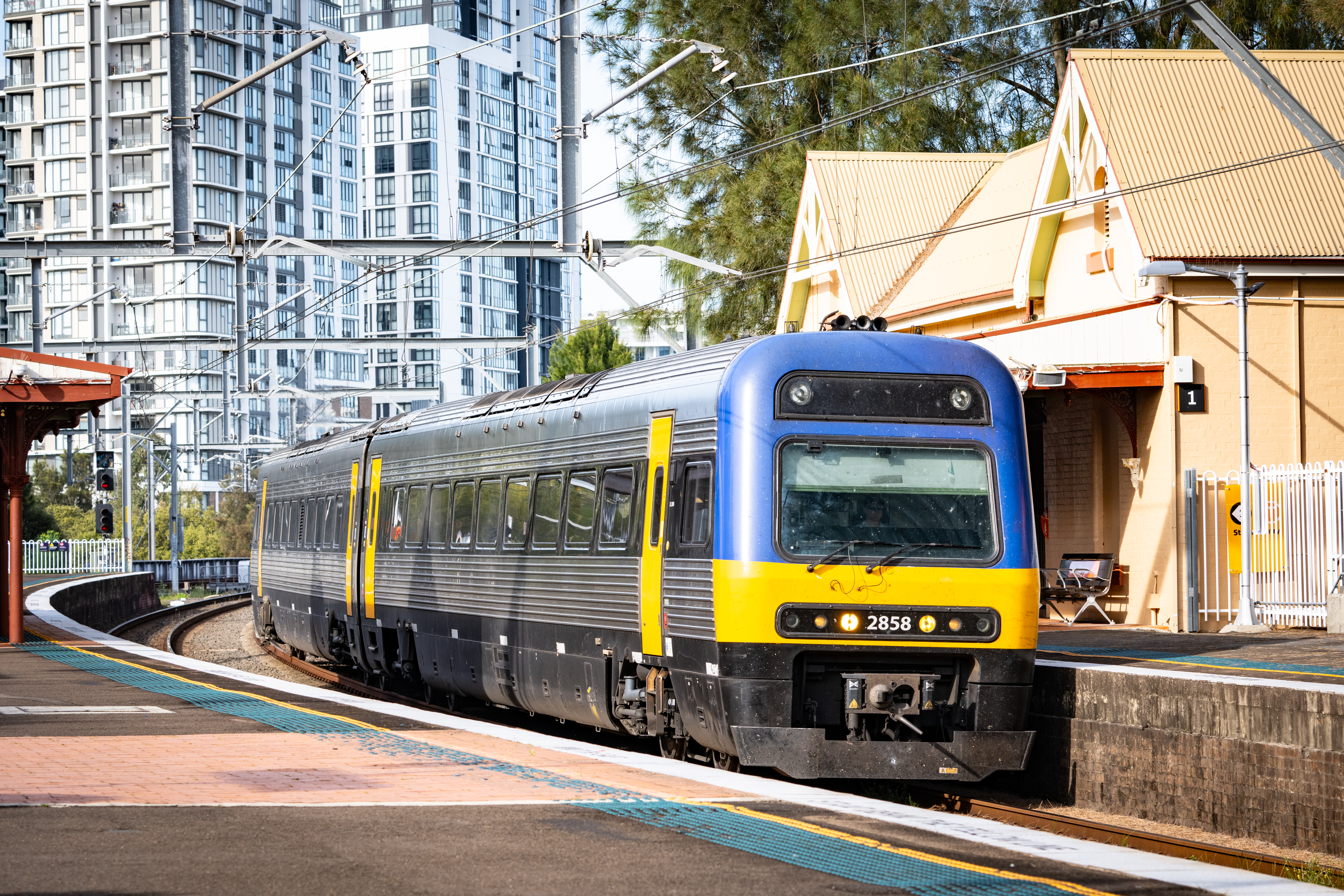
Endeavour at Tempe station

== Patronage ==
The following table shows the patronage of each line of the NSW TrainLink Intercity network for the year ending 30 June 2026, based on Opal tap on and tap off data.

2025–26 NSW TrainLink Intercity patronage by line
Blue Mountains Line	6,634,999
Central Coast & Newcastle Line	12,765,284
Hunter Line	839,041
South Coast Line	7,445,930
Southern Highlands Line	553,390
