= Hume Highway exits and interchanges =

The Hume Highway exits and major intersections are spread across the Australian states of New South Wales and Victoria.

The Hume Highway national route is in four sections comprising, from north to south, urban stretches of the highway in Sydney, a motorway from the outskirts of Sydney to the Southern Highlands, a grade-separated highway in regional New South Wales, and a freeway throughout Victoria.

== In New South Wales ==
=== Hume Highway in Sydney ===
LGA	Location	km	mi	Destinations	Notes
Inner West	Haberfield	0	0.0	Great Western Highway / Parramatta Road (A22) – Sydney CBD, Sydney Airport (east)	Controlled Y-intersection; northern highway terminus; Road continues east as the Parramatta Road (A22)
Inner West	Haberfield	0	0.0	Great Western Highway / Parramatta Road (no shield), Strathfield, Parramatta (west)	Controlled Y-intersection; northern highway terminus; Road continues west as the Parramatta Road (no shield)
Burwood	Enfield	3.8	2.4	Burwood Road (no shield) – Burwood, Campsie	Controlled intersection
Canterbury Bankstown	Greenacre	7.5	4.7	Centenary Drive (A3), Homebush, Ryde, St Ives, Mona Vale (north); Roberts Road (A3), Beverley Hills, Hurstville, Blakehurst (south)	Offset diamond interchange
Canterbury Bankstown	Greenacre	7.5	4.7	Stacey Street (A6), Lidcombe, Auburn, Silverwater, Carlingford (south); Stacey Street (A6), Bankstown, Padstow, Menai, Heathcote (south)	Diamond interchange
Fairfield	Villawood	18.0	11.2	Woodville Road, Merrylands (north); Henry Lawson Drive, Georges Hall, Milperra, East Hills, Peakhurst (south)	The Meccano Set, an at-grade intersection; Westbound exit to and entrance from Henry Lawson Drive; eastbound exit to and entrance from Woodville Road only
Prospect Creek		18.5	11.5	Lansdowne Bridge (northbound carriageway only)	
Liverpool	Liverpool	24.0	14.9	Cumberland Highway (A28), Cabramatta, Wentworthville, Pennant Hills (north) to Gosford, Newcastle	Controlled Y-intersection; southern terminus of A22; Road continues south as the Hume Highway (A28)
Liverpool	Liverpool	25.5	15.8	Macquarie Street (A34), Moorebank, Punchbowl, Campsie, Newtown (east)	Controlled Y-intersection; western terminus of A34; Road continues south/north as the Hume Highway (A28)
Liverpool	Casula	26.7	16.6	M5 Motorway (M5), Bankstown, Arncliffe, Sydney Airport to Sydney CBD (east)	Partial diamond interchange; Southbound exit heading east; and north- and southbound entrance, heading west only
Liverpool	Casula	30.1	18.7	Campbelltown Road (no shield), Campbelltown, Denham Court to Hume Motorway	Controlled Y-interchange
Liverpool	Prestons	31.2	19.4	M5 Motorway (M5), Bankstown, Arncliffe, Sydney Airport to Sydney CBD (northeast)	Partial diamond interchange; south-western terminus of A28; south-western highway terminus; Exit northeast as the M5 Motorway (M5)
Liverpool	Prestons	31.2	19.4	Westlink M7 (M7), Eastern Creek, Blacktown to Newcastle (north)	Partial diamond interchange; south-western terminus of A28; south-western highway terminus; Exit north as the Westlink M7 (M7)
Liverpool	Prestons	31.2	19.4	Camden Valley Way (no shield), Leppington, Narellan, Camden (west)	Partial diamond interchange; south-western terminus of A28; south-western highway terminus; Road continues west as the Camden Valley Way (no shield)
1.000 mi = 1.609 km; 1.000 km = 0.621 mi: Incomplete access; Tolled; Route transition; Listing includes: Terminuses, declared roads, former alignments, and intersections where a turn is required to remain on the highway, and minor roads at these intersections.

=== Hume Motorway ===
LGA	Location	km	mi	Exit	Destinations	Notes
Liverpool	Prestons	0	0.0	1	South Western Motorway (M5) [east], Bankstown, Arncliffe, Sydney Airport to Sydney CBD	Roden Cutler VC Interchange; Northern terminus of M31; northern motorway terminus; Road continues east as the M5 Motorway (M5)
Liverpool	Prestons	0	0.0	1	Westlink M7 (M7), Eastern Creek, Blacktown to Newcastle (north)	Northern terminus of M31; northern motorway terminus; Road continues north as the Westlink M7 (M7)
Liverpool	Casula	0	0.0	2	Camden Valley Way (A28), Casula, Liverpool, Narellan, Camden	Partial diamond interchange; southbound entrance via Campbelltown Road
Campbelltown	Denham Court	4.6	2.9	3	Brooks Road, Denham Court, Ingleburn	Partial diamond interchange; southbound exit and northbound entrance only
Campbelltown	Ingleburn	6.6	4.1	4	Campbelltown Road, Denham Court, Ingleburn and industrial area	Partial diamond interchange; southbound entrance and northbound exit only
Campbelltown	St Andrews	10.1	6.3	5	Campbelltown Road – Campbelltown	Partial offset dumbbell interchange; northbound entrance and southbound exit only; northbound entrance via Raby Road
Campbelltown	Blairmount	15.7	9.8	6	Narellan Road (B69) – Campbelltown, Western Sydney University (east); Narellan Road (A9). Narellan, Camden, Penrith (west)	Partial cloverleaf interchange
Nepean River		22.8	14.2	Menangle Bridge		
Nepean River		32.0	19.9	Douglas Park Bridge		
Wollondilly	Wilton	37.9	23.5		Picton Road (B88), Picton, Wollongong	Diamond interchange
Nepean River		38.9	24.2	Pheasants Nest Bridge		
Wingecarribee	Bargo	49.0	30.4		Avon Dam Road, Bargo, Tahmoor	Partial diamond interchange; northbound entrance and southbound exit only
Wingecarribee	Yerrinbool	51.7	32.1		Remembrance Drive, Bargo, Tahmoor	Half-trumpet interchange; southbound entrance and northbound exit only
Wingecarribee	Alpine	63.2	39.3		Old Hume Highway, Yerrinbool, Yanderra, Colo Vale, Bargo	Dumbbell interchange
Wingecarribee	Aylmerton	65.1	40.5		Old Hume Highway (B73), Mittagong, Bowral, Moss Vale, Wombeyan Caves	Half-trumpet interchange; southbound exit and northbound entrance only
Wingecarribee	Welby	72.7	45.2		Old Hume Highway, Mittagong, Wombeyan Caves	Partial diamond interchange; southbound entrance and northbound exit only
Wingecarribee River		82.3	51.1	Bridge over the river (bridge name unknown)		
Wingecarribee	Berrima	85.2	52.9		Medway Road – Medway, Berrima	Partial diamond interchange; southbound exit and northbound entrance only
Wingecarribee	Berrima	87.7	54.5		Old Hume Highway. Berrima, Moss Vale	Partial diamond interchange; southbound entrance and northbound exit only
Wingecarribee	Berrima	88.0	54.7	n/a	Hume Highway (M31), Goulburn, Albury, Melbourne	Southern motorway terminus; Road continues southwest as the Hume Highway (M31)
1.000 mi = 1.609 km; 1.000 km = 0.621 mi: Incomplete access; Tolled; Route transition; Listing includes: Terminuses, declared roads, former alignments, and intersections where a turn is required to remain on the highway, and minor roads at these intersections.

=== Hume Highway in regional areas ===
State	LGA	Location	km	mi	Destinations	Notes
New South Wales	Wingecarribee	Berrima	0	0.0	Hume Motorway (M31), Campbelltown, Liverpool, Sydney to Newcastle, Brisbane	Northern highway terminus; Road continues northeast as the Hume Motorway (M31)
New South Wales	Wingecarribee	Sutton Forest	9	5.6	Illawarra Highway (A48), Moss Vale, Robertson, Albion Park, to Wollongong	Diamond interchange
New South Wales	Wingecarribee	Sutton Forest	12	7.5	Sallys Corner Road, Exeter, Bundanoon	Diamond interchange
New South Wales	Paddys River		23	14	Bridge over the creek (bridge name unknown)	
New South Wales	Wingecarribee	Paddys River	23	14	Murrimba Road, Wingello, Bundanoon	Uncontrolled road intersection
New South Wales	Goulburn Mulwaree	Marulan	34	21	Highland Way, Tallong, Wingello	Uncontrolled road intersection
New South Wales	Goulburn Mulwaree	Marulan	36	22	Marulan Heavy Vehicle Checking Station	Signalled entrance to the station based on laden weight
New South Wales	Goulburn Mulwaree	Marulan	40	25	Jerra Road, Bungonia	Diamond interchange, with partial dumbbell
New South Wales	Goulburn Mulwaree	Goulburn	60	37	Sydney Road, Goulburn	Partial trumpet interchange
New South Wales	Goulburn Mulwaree	Goulburn	70	43	Hume Street, Goulburn	Roundabout interchange
New South Wales	Goulburn Mulwaree	Yarra	79	49	Federal Highway (M23) – Canberra	Partial directional T interchange; traffic from the southwest that is turning south must perform a U-turn north of the interchange
New South Wales	Yass Valley	Yass	137	85	Yass Valley Way – Yass	Uncontrolled road intersection
New South Wales	Yass Valley	Yass	142	88	Barton Highway (A25) – Canberra	Trumpet interchange
New South Wales	Yass Valley	Yass	151	94	Yass Valley Way – Yass	Trumpet interchange
New South Wales	Hilltops	Bowning	154	96	Lachlan Valley Way (B81), Boorowa, Cowra, Cudal, Molong	Uncontrolled road intersection
New South Wales	Hilltops	Bowning	163	101	Burley Griffin Way (B94), Harden, Temora, Ardlethan, Griffith	Uncontrolled road intersection
New South Wales	Jugiong Creek		203	126	Bridge over the creek (bridge name unknown)	
New South Wales	Hilltops	Jugiong	204	127	McMahons Reef Road, Jugiong; Riverside Drive, Jugiong	Partial trumpet interchange; northbound entrance and southbound exit only
New South Wales	Hilltops	Jugiong	207	129	Jugiong Road, Jugiong	Partial diamond interchange; northbound entrance and exit only
New South Wales	Hilltops	Jugiong	209	130	Riverside Drive, Jugiong	Uncontrolled three-way intersection; southbound entrance only
New South Wales	Gundagai	Gundagai	244	152	West Street, Gundagai	Partial trumpet interchange; southbound exit and entrance, and northbound entrance only
New South Wales	Gundagai	Gundagai	246	153	Sheridan Street, Gundagai	Partial trumpet interchange; southbound exit and entrance, and northbound exit only
New South Wales	Murrumbidgee River		247	153	Sheahan Bridge	
New South Wales	Gundagai	South Gundagai	248	154	Middle Street / Cross Street / South Street, Gundagai	Offset diamond interchange
New South Wales	Wagga Wagga	Mundarlo	273	170	Snowy Mountains Highway (B72), Adelong, Tumut, Cooma	Partial directional T interchange; southbound exit and entrance and northbound exit only
New South Wales	Wagga Wagga	Tarcutta	283	176	Sturt Highway (A20), Wagga Wagga, Narrandera, Hay, Mildura, Renmark	T-bone interchange
New South Wales	Wagga Wagga	Tarcutta	289	180	Sydney Street, Tarcutta	Partial diamond interchange; northbound exit and southbound entrance only
New South Wales	Tarcutta Creek		291	181	Bridge over the creek (bridge name unknown)	
New South Wales	Wagga Wagga	Tarcutta	292	181	unnamed exit road, Tarcutta	Partial diamond interchange; northbound exit only
New South Wales	Wagga Wagga	Tarcutta	294	183	Humula Link Road, Tarcutta	Partial diamond interchange; southbound entrance only
New South Wales	Greater Hume Shire	Kyeamba	318	198	Tumbarumba Road, Tumbarumba	Partial trumpet interchange; southbound entrance and exit only
New South Wales	Greater Hume Shire	Little Billabong	335	208	Little Billabong Road Tumbarumba	Uncontrolled road intersection
New South Wales	Greater Hume Shire	Holbrook	359	223	Holbrook Wagga Road, Holbrook, Cookardinia	Diamond interchange
New South Wales	Greater Hume Shire	Holbrook	363	226	Albury Street – Holbrook	Diamond interchange
New South Wales	Albury	Table Top	403	250	Olympic Highway (A41), Wagga Wagga, Junee, Cootamundra, Cowra	Trumpet interchange
New South Wales	Albury	Table Top	408	254	Burma Road – Ettamogah Pub, Albury	Uncontrolled road intersection
New South Wales	Albury	Table Top	411	255	Wagga Road, Springdale Heights, Lavington, North Albury, Albury	Dumbbell interchange
New South Wales	Albury	Thurgoona	416	258	Thurgoona Drive, Thurgoona, Springdale Heights, Albury Airport	Dumbbell interchange
New South Wales	Albury	Lavington	418	260	Racecourse Road – Lavington, Albury Airport	Partial dumbbell interchange; southbound entrance and northbound exit only
New South Wales	Albury	East Albury	421	262	Riverina Highway (B58), Finley, Deniliquin, Lake Hume	Diamond interchange
New South Wales	Murray River		425	264	Spirit of Progress Bridge	
New South Wales – Victoria state border			425	264	New South Wales – Victoria state border	
Victoria	Wodonga	Wodonga	426	265	Hume Freeway (M31), Chiltern, Wangaratta, Benalla, Seymour; towards Melbourne	Southern highway terminus; Road continues southwest as the Hume Freeway (M31)
1.000 mi = 1.609 km; 1.000 km = 0.621 mi: Incomplete access; Route transition; Listing includes: Terminuses, declared roads, former alignments, and intersections where a turn is required to remain on the highway, and minor roads at these intersections.

== In Victoria ==
=== Hume Freeway ===
LGA	Location	km	mi	Destinations	Notes
Wodonga	Wodonga	0	0.0	Hume Highway (M31), Albury, Gundagai, Goulburn, Sydney	Northern terminus of freeway, road continues northeast into NSW as Hume Highway
Wodonga	Wodonga	0.3	0.19	Bandiana Link Road (B400 east), Wodonga, Bandiana, Tallangatta	Partial dumbbell interchange, southbound exit and northbound entrance only
Wodonga	Wodonga	1	0.62	Lincoln Causeway (C319 north), Albury; High Street (south), to Beechworth-Wodonga Road (C315), Wodonga, Beechworth; Bandiana Link Road (B400 east), Bandiana, Tallangatta	Eastern terminus of concurrency with route B400 terminus at partial diamond interchange Northbound entrance via Bandiana Link Road
Wodonga	Wodonga	3	1.9	Melrose Drive (C538 south), Wodonga; Moloney Drive (north), Wodonga	Partial diamond interchange, southbound exit and northbound entrance only
Wodonga	West Wodonga	4	2.5	Melbourne Road (C529), Wodonga	Partial Y interchange, southbound entrance and northbound exit only
Indigo	Barnawartha	17	11	Murray Valley Highway (B400 west), Yarrawonga, Echuca	Western terminus of concurrency with route B400 at trumpet interchange
Indigo	Barnawartha	23	14	Indigo Creek Road, Barnawartha, Upper Indigo	Diamond interchange
Indigo	Chiltern	31	19	Main Street (Chiltern-Howlong Road) (C381 north) – Chiltern, Howlong; Beechworth-Chiltern Road (C377 south), Beechworth	Diamond interchange
Wangaratta	Springhurst	44	27	Rutherglen-Springhurst Road (C376 north) – Springhurst, Rutherglen	Diamond and partial dumbbell interchange
Wangaratta	Byawatha	61	38	Bowser Road (C314), Wangaratta, Bowser, to Federation Way (C375), Wahgunyah, Corowa	Trumpet interchange
Wangaratta	East Wangaratta	68	42	Great Alpine Road (B500 east), Beechworth, Bright, Mount Hotham, Bairnsdale	Diamond interchange
Ovens River		69	43	Bridge over the river (bridge name unknown)	
King River		71	44	Bridge over the river (bridge name unknown)	
Wangaratta	South Wangaratta	76	47	Greta Road (C523), Wangaratta, Greta	Diamond interchange
Wangaratta	South Wangaratta	78	48	Glenrowan Road (C314), Wangaratta	Partial-Y interchange, southbound entrance and northbound exit only
Wangaratta	South Wangaratta	81	50	Snow Road (C522), Glenrowan, Oxley, Milawa, Myrtleford	Partial diamond interchange, southbound entrance and northbound exit only
Wangaratta	Glenrowan	86	53	Glenrowan-Moyhu Road, Glenrowan, Moyhu	Partial diamond interchange, southbound exit and northbound entrance only
Wangaratta	Glenrowan	88	55	Winton-Glenrowan Road – Winton, Glenrowan	Partial diamond interchange, southbound entrance and northbound exit only
Benalla	Winton	103	64	Sydney Road (C313 west), Benalla, to Benalla-Yarrawonga Road (C373), Yarrawonga; Winton-Glenrowan Road (east) – Winton, Glenrowan	Diamond and partial dumbbell interchange
Benalla	Benalla	115	71	Midland Highway (A300 north), Shepparton, Mooroopna, Bendigo, Geelong; Midland Highway (B300 south), Maindample, Yea, Yarra Glen, Lilydale	Diamond interchange
Strathbogie	Violet Town	138	86	Murchison-Violet Town Road (C345 north), Violet Town, Murchison; Harrys Creek Road (south), Harrys Creek	Diamond interchange
Strathbogie	Euroa	155	96	Euroa Main Road (C312 west), Euroa	Partial dumbbell and partial diamond interchange
Strathbogie	Euroa	162	101	Euroa Main Road (C312 east), Euroa	Diamond interchange
Strathbogie	Avenel	193	120	Avenel-Nagambie Road (C346 north), Avenel, Nagambie; Tarcombe Road (south), Tarcombe	Uncontrolled road intersection
Mitchell	Seymour	207	129	Goulburn Valley Freeway (M39 north), Nagambie, Shepparton, Dubbo, Brisbane; Goulburn Valley Highway (B340 east) – Seymour, Yea	Trumpet and partial cloverleaf interchange
Goulburn River		209	130	Bridge over the river (bridge name unknown)	
Goulburn River		214	133	Bridge over the river (bridge name unknown)	
Mitchell	Hilldene	214	133	Seymour-Tooborac Road (C384), Seymour, Puckapunyal, Tooborac	Diamond interchange
Mitchell	Tallarook	221	137	Main Road to Upper Goulburn Road (C383), Tallarook	Partial diamond interchange, southbound exit and northbound entrance only
Mitchell	Tallarook	223	139	Upper Goulburn Road, Tallarook	Partial trumpet interchange, northbound exit and southbound entrance only
Mitchell	Broadford	233	145	High Street (Broadford-Kilmore Road) (C311 west) – Broadford, Kilmore	Partial diamond interchange, southbound exit and northbound entrance only
Mitchell	Broadford	235	146	Strath Creek Road (C382) – Broadford, Flowerdale	Partial diamond interchange, southbound entrance and northbound exit only
Mitchell	Clonbinane	244	152	Broadford-Wallan Road, Clonbinane, Broadford, Waterford Park	Diamond interchange
Mitchell	Wandong	252	157	Epping-Kilmore Road (C729), Wandong, Kilmore	Diamond interchange
Mitchell	Wallan	261	162	Wallan-Whittlesea Road (C727), Whittlesea, Wallan	Partial diamond interchange, southbound exit and northbound entrance only
Mitchell	Beveridge	265	165	Northern Highway (B75 north), Wallan, Echuca	Partial-Y interchange, southbound entrance and northbound exit only
Mitchell	Beveridge	268	167	Lithgow Street, to Old Hume Highway – Beveridge	Diamond interchange; to be replaced with a new Camerons Lane interchange
Hume	Kalkallo	276	171	Donnybrook Road (C723) – Mickleham, Donnybrook	Partial cloverleaf and partial dumbbell interchange
Hume	Craigieburn	279	173	Sydney Road (State Route 55 south), Craigieburn, Campbellfield	Partial-Y interchange, southbound exit and northbound entrance only
Hume	Craigieburn	280	170	Amaroo Road – Craigieburn	Partial dumbbell interchange, southbound entrance and northbound exit only
Whittlesea	Wollert	283	176	Craigieburn Road East (C722) – Craigieburn, Wollert	Partial diamond interchange, southbound entrance and northbound exit only
Whittlesea	Epping	288	179	O'Herns Road (B716 east), Epping, South Morang	Diamond interchange
Whittlesea	Epping	290	180	Cooper Street (State Route 58) – Epping, Somerton, Northern Hospital	Diamond interchange
Whittlesea	Thomastown	295	183	Metropolitan Ring Road (M80 east), Bundoora, Greensborough; Western Ring Road (M80 west), Jacana, Tullamarine, Keilor, Derrimut, Laverton North, Melbourne Airport	Southern terminus of freeway and route M31 at semi-directional T interchange
1.000 mi = 1.609 km; 1.000 km = 0.621 mi: Concurrency terminus; Incomplete access; Route transition; Listing includes: Terminuses, declared roads, former alignments, and intersections where a turn is required to remain on the highway, and minor roads at these intersections.

== See also ==
- Highways in Australia
- List of highways in New South Wales
- List of highways in Victoria
