= Remembrance Drive =

Road in New South Wales

Remembrance Drive New South Wales
- Coordinates: 34.073844°S 150.696291°E (North end); 34.404792°S 150.506325°E (South end)

General information
- Type: Road
- Length: 54.3 km (34 mi)
- Gazetted: August 1928 (as Main Road 2); November 1984 (as Main Road 620)
- Former route number: State Route 89 (1980–2013); National Highway 31 (1974–1980); National Route 31 (1954–1974)

Major junctions
- North end: Camden Valley Way; Cawdor Road; Camden South, New South Wales
- Picton Road; Hume Motorway
- South end: Church Avenue; Alpine, New South Wales

Location(s)
- Major suburbs: Picton, Tahmoor, Bargo, Yanderra

Remembrance Drive is a rural road that links Camden and Alpine on the fringes of south-western Sydney, New South Wales. The road served as the former alignment of Hume Highway and now forms part of Old Hume Highway.

== Route ==
Remembrance Drive commences at the intersection of Camden Valley Way and Cawdor Road in Camden and heads south as a two-lane, single carriageway road through Camden, widening to a four-lane, dual-carriageway road at the intersection with Camden Bypass, narrowing soon after to a two-lane, single carriageway road at Camden Park, and twisting through the Razorback Range, passing through the towns of Picton, Tahmoor, Bargo and Yanderra, where it meets Hume Motorway for the first time. It continues in a southerly direction alongside the motorway and the Main Southern railway line through Yerrinbool until it eventually terminates at an interchange with Hume Motorway again at Alpine. In addition to the former alignment of Hume Highway, it was also a part of Remembrance Driveway that spans from Sydney to Canberra. After Remembrance Driveway was realigned to the present Hume Highway and Hume Motorway alignment in late 1980s, the former route is designated as Remembrance Drive.

== History ==
The driveway is historic, being a part of the original Great South Road, servicing the traffic between Sydney and Melbourne. The first road over the Razorback Range was cut in 1825 by convict gangs. The current route was cleared in 1830. Some sections of the route still use the concrete pavement laid in the 1920s and 1930s. The stretch along the Razorback Range is relatively steep. Between Picton and Bargo, the route passes through the town of Tahmoor instead of following an even older alignment of Hume Highway through Thirlmere, Hill Top and Colo Vale.

Within New South Wales, the passing of the Main Roads Act of 1924 through the Parliament of New South Wales provided for the declaration of Main Roads, roads partially funded by the State government through the Main Roads Board (MRB). Main Road No. 2 was declared along Great South Road on 8 August 1928, heading south from Camden through Picton, Bargo, Yanderra and Alpine (and continuing northeast through Narellan, Liverpool and Bankstown to the intersection with Great Western Highway at Ashfield, and continuing southwest through Mittagong, Goulburn, Yass and Gundagai to Albury). With the passing of the Main Roads (Amendment) Act of 1929 to provide for additional declarations of State Highways and Trunk Roads, this was amended to State Highway 2 on 8 April 1929. Great South Road was renamed Hume Highway later in 1928.

The Department of Main Roads (having succeeded the MRB in 1932) declared Main Road 620 along Remembrance Drive from Camden, through Picton and Bargo to Yanderra (and continuing north along Camden Bypass to Narellan, and Camden Valley Way between Narellan and Prestons) when State Highway 2 was re-aligned along South Western Freeway, on 24 October 1984; the section between Yanderra and Alpine remained undeclared.

The passing of the Roads Act of 1993 updated road classifications and the way they could be declared within New South Wales. Under this act, Remembrance Drive retains its declaration as part of Main Road 620 (from Camden to Yanderra).

As part of Hume Highway, the route was allocated National Route 31 in 1954 for its entire length. The Whitlam government introduced the federal National Roads Act 1974, where roads declared as a National Highway were still the responsibility of the states for road construction and maintenance, but were fully compensated by the Federal government for money spent on approved projects. As an important interstate link between the capitals of New South Wales and Victoria, Hume Highway was declared a National Highway in 1974, and the section between Yanderra and Camden was re-designated National Highway 31. When the section of South Western Freeway between Yanderra and Alpine opened in 1977, and the remaining section between Macarthur and Yanderra was open in late 1980, National Highway 31 was re-allocated along it each time; the entire former alignment between Camden and Alpine was allocated State Route 89 in 1980. With the conversion to the newer alphanumeric system in 2013, State Route 89 was abolished.

The towns and settlements along the route are historic and a tourist attraction in their own right.

== Major intersections ==
LGA	Location	km	mi	Destinations	Notes
Camden	Camden	0.0	0.0	Argyle Street (Camden Valley Way) (east) – Narellan; Cawdor Road (west) – Cawdor, Razorback	Northern terminus of road
Camden	Camden–Camden South boundary	2.1	1.3	Camden Bypass – Narellan	
Camden	Camden–Camden South boundary	2.4	1.5	Burragorang Road – The Oaks, Nattai	
Wollondilly	Cawdor–Menangle Park boundary	7.6	4.7	Finns Road – Menangle, Douglas Park	Roundabout
Wollondilly	Razorback	12.6	7.8	Mount Hercules Road – Razorback	
Wollondilly	Picton	20.0	12.4	Menangle Street (Picton Road) – Maldon, Wilton, Wollongong	
Wollondilly	Picton	20.4	12.7	Main Southern railway line	
Bargo River		29.4	18.3	Bridge (no known official name)	
Wollondilly	Bargo	29.5	18.3	Main Southern railway line	
Wollondilly	Yanderra	39.3	24.4	Hume Motorway (M31) – Mittagong, Goulburn, Canberra	Southbound entrance and northbound exit only
Wollondilly	Yanderra	41.3	25.7	Main Southern railway line	
Wingecarribee	Yerrinbool	42.4	26.3	Main Southern railway line	
Wingecarribee	Yerrinbool	48.2	30.0	Main Southern railway line	
Wingecarribee	Alpine	50.0	31.1	Main Southern railway line	
Wingecarribee	Alpine	50.8	31.6	Main Southern railway line	
Wingecarribee	Alpine	51.7	32.1	Old South Road – Bowral	
Wingecarribee	Alpine–Colo Vale boundary	54.3	33.7	Hume Motorway (M31) – Prestons, Liverpool, Goulburn, Canberra	Diamond interchange
Wingecarribee	Alpine–Colo Vale boundary	54.3	33.7	Church Avenue – Colo Vale	Southern terminus of road
Incomplete access; Route transition

== See also ==
- Highways in Australia
- List of highways in New South Wales
- Old Hume Highway
