= Yanderra railway station =

Former railway station in New South Wales, Australia

Yanderra

General information
- Location: Old Hume Highway, Yanderra, New South Wales; Australia
- Coordinates: 34°19′28″S 150°34′03″E
- Operator: Public Transport Commission
- Line: Main South
- Distance: 109.100 km from Central
- Platforms: 2 (2 side)
- Tracks: 2

Construction
- Structure type: Ground

Other information
- Status: Demolished

History
- Opened: 2 August 1924
- Closed: 24 November 1975

Services
Preceding station	Former services	Following station
Yerrinbool towards Albury	Main Southern Line	Bargo towards Sydney
Location

Yanderra railway station was a railway station on the Main Southern railway line, serving the village of Yanderra in the Southern Highlands, New South Wales. The station provided passenger services between 1924 and 1975, and was demolished after closure. Yanderra is known for the murder of three railway workers that occurred during an attempted railway robbery in 1941.

== History ==
Yanderra station opened on 2 August 1924, on the Picton to Mittagong deviation, and was built as an infill station, with both adjacent stations opening with the deviation in 1919. The station consisted of two small concrete side platforms with basic facilities on both sides.

The station closed to passenger services on 24 November 1975, and the platforms were subsequently demolished. No part of the station remains extant.

== Incidents ==
On 8 July 1930, a man was killed and his body mutilated on the tracks close to Yanderra station. Authorities determined his cause of death to be from falling out of a train.

On 9 March 1930, a car travelling over a nearby railway bridge crashed through the brick and onto the track, resulting in a woman inside the vehicle breaking her back.

On the night of 30 August 1932, 32 year-old Edna Burgess was struck and killed by the Melbourne Express on the south side of the station. The force of the accident mutilated the upper half of her body, whilst severing both her arms and decapitating her. A handbag with a blank cheque form was found near her, allowing for her identification by authorities.

On 24 February 1947, a truck crashed into the parapet of a nearby railway bridge, dislodging three tonnes of bricks onto the tracks and injuring the two young men inside.

=== Yanderra payroll robbery ===
On the night of 7 December 1941, a New South Wales FP5 railway paybus was deliberately blown up in an attempted robbery by a homemade dynamite bomb attached to a wire acting as a detonator, and laid on the tracks near the station. The force of the explosion completely destroyed portions of the paybus, and twisted the perway. Two of the three workers inside were killed instantly, with the third dying in hospital after being rescued from underneath the wreckage. The incident resulted in a nationwide manhunt for the perpetrators. Although the murders were never solved, by the mid-1950s it became generally accepted that the robbery had been orchestrated by Lionel Charles Thomas, who had become notorious for the 1950 murder of widow Phyllis Page. Serving in the Australian Army during World War II, Thomas had been dishonourably discharged for theft, and by the 1950s, had been tried for murder four times including that of an assistant stationmaster at Carnegie railway station in Melbourne in 1945. He had also been charged for blinding two men in separate pepper attacks. He hanged himself in his prison cell in 1951.
