= Colo Parish =

Coordinates: 34°23′S 150°29′E

- Cadastral division
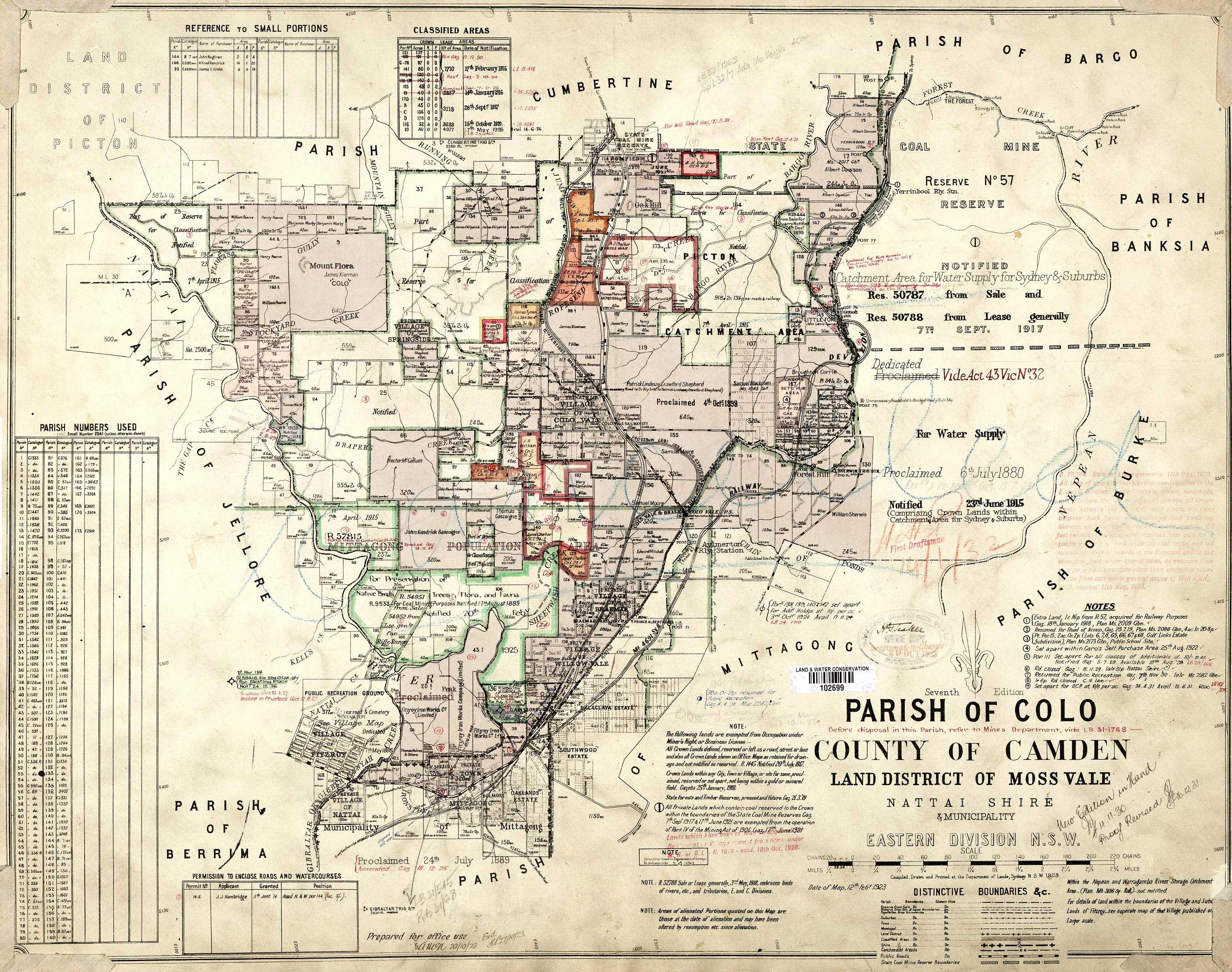
- 1923 parish map
- Country: Australia
- State: New South Wales
- Region: Southern Highlands
- LGA: Wingecarribee
- County: Camden
- Division: Eastern
Lands administrative divisions around Colo Parish
Jellore	Cumbertine	Bargo
Jellore	Colo Parish	Banksia
Berrima	Mittagong	Burke

The Parish of Colo is a parish of the County of Camden in the Southern Highlands region of New South Wales. It is centred on the town of Colo Vale, and includes Aylmerton, Willow Vale, Alpine and Yerrinbool. It also includes the northern parts of Mittagong that are north of the Old Hume Highway. The new Hume Highway runs through the parish from south-west to north-east.

Its western boundary is the Nattai River and part of Gibbergunyah (Gibraltar) creek. The southern boundary for a large portion is the Old Hume Highway. The northern boundary is near, but not including Hill Top. The eastern boundary is the Nepean River. Part of the boundary in the north-east is Forest Creek and the Bargo River.

The Picton Loop railway line runs through the parish from north to south, including the station at Colo Vale. The Southern Highlands section of the Main Southern railway line also passes through the parish, including Yerrinbool station.
