= Aylmerton railway station =

Former railway station in New South Wales, Australia

Aylmerton
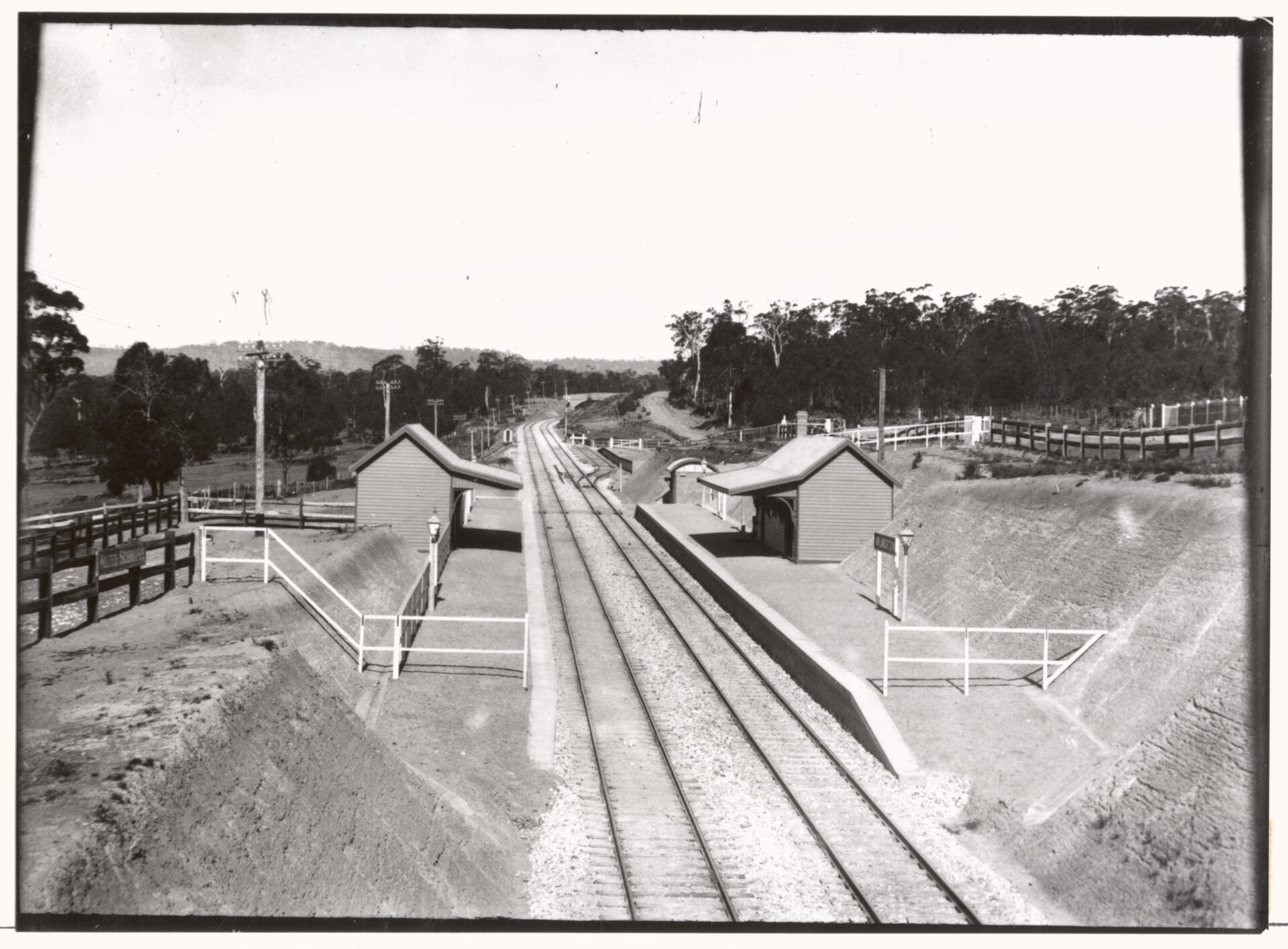
- The station at time of opening in 1919.

General information
- Location: Park Avenue, Aylmerton, New South Wales; Australia
- Coordinates: 34°25′16″S 150°29′54″E
- Operator: Public Transport Commission
- Line: Main South
- Distance: 125.60 kilometres from Central
- Platforms: 2 (2 side)
- Tracks: 2

Construction
- Structure type: Ground

Other information
- Status: Demolished

History
- Opened: 13 July 1919
- Closed: 22 March 1975

Services
| Preceding station | Former services | Following station |
|---|---|---|
| Mittagong towards Albury | Main Southern Line | Yerrinbool towards Sydney |
Location

Aylmerton railway station was a railway station on the Main Southern railway line, serving the town of Aylmerton in the Southern Highlands, New South Wales. Services to the station ceased in 1975, and the station itself was subsequently demolished.

== History ==
Aylmerton station first opened on 13 July 1919, when a deviation was constructed on the Main Southern line from Picton to Mittagong. The town itself had previously been part of Colo Vale, but the opening of the station led to the separation of the area into two towns, with the name Aylmerton adopted from the railway station.

The station was known for its well-kept gardens, with the station winning the annual Royal Commissioner's Best Station Garden Prize (between Glenlee and Demondrille) in 1922.

On 10 February 1929, the body of a man identified as William M'Farlane from Concord, was discovered on the railway tracks close to the station. The death was determined to have been accidental, with the man assumed to have jumped from the train after missing his station.

The station closed to passenger services on 22 March 1975, and the platforms were demolished. No remains are extant.
