= BZG =

BZG or bzg may refer to:

- BZG, the IATA code for Bydgoszcz Ignacy Jan Paderewski Airport, Poland
- BZG, the station code for Bargo railway station, New South Wales, Australia
- bzg, the ISO 639-3 code for Babuza language, Taiwan
