= Camden Valley Way =

Road in New South Wales

Camden Valley Way Old Hume Highway New South Wales
- Coordinates: 33.957736°S 150.887073°E (Northeast end); 34.055500°S 150.693540°E (Southwest end)

General information
- Type: Road
- Length: 23.1 km (14 mi)
- Gazetted: August 1928 (as Main Road 2); June 1974 (as Main Road 178)
- Route number(s): A28 (2013–present) (Prestons–Casula)
- Former route number: State Route 89 (1980–2013); National Highway 31 (1974–1980); National Route 31 (1954–1974)

Major junctions
- Northeast end: Hume Highway; Casula, Sydney
- Westlink; South Western Motorway; Hume Motorway
- Southwest end: Murray Street; Camden, Sydney

Location(s)
- Major suburbs: Prestons, Leppington, Gledswood Hills, Narellan

Camden Valley Way is a 23-kilometre (14 mi) arterial road between the southwestern fringes of suburban Sydney and the historic town of Camden. It is a former alignment of Hume Highway.

== Route ==
Camden Valley Way follows the Old Hume Highway alignment between the localities of Casula and Camden, commencing at the intersection with Hume Highway and Campbelltown Road at Casula and heading west as a four-lane, dual-carriageway road, meeting Hume Motorway at an interchange at Prestons, then intersecting with Bringelly and Cowpasture Roads at Horningsea Park and heading in a southwesterly direction, through Leppington and Gledswood, meeting The Northern and Narellan Roads at Narellan, before eventually terminating at the intersection with Murray Street in Camden; Cawdor Road continues south towards Remembrance Drive along the Old Hume Highway alignment. The Remembrance Drive is also another former part of the Hume Highway near Camden South.

The road had become an important arterial road serving the fast-growing Sydney's South West Growth Centre. Since 2015, the road north of The Northern Road is dual carriageway and has four lanes (two lanes in each direction) with a median strip.

=== Camden Bypass ===
Camden Valley Way was bypassed by Camden Bypass between Narellan Road and Remembrance Driveway. The highlight of the Camden Bypass is the Macarthur Bridge, a 26-span, 1.03-kilometre-long (3,380 ft) concrete structure that carries the Camden Bypass across the Nepean River and its flood plain. The bridge was built between 1971 and 1973, originally to carry Hume Highway traffic, on a flood-free alignment around Camden. This bypass was in turn bypassed in December 1980 when the section of what was then called the South Western Freeway (F5) from Campbelltown to Yerrinbool was opened. It has grown in importance as a major arterial road linking the Hume, Westlink M7 and M5 Motorways in Prestons with Camden.

== History ==
Within New South Wales, the passing of the Main Roads Act of 1924 through the Parliament of New South Wales provided for the declaration of Main Roads, roads partially funded by the State government through the Main Roads Board (MRB). Main Road No. 2 was declared along Great South Road on 8 August 1928, heading southwest from the intersection with Campbelltown Road at Casula through Narellan to Camden (and continuing northeast through Liverpool and Bankstown to the intersection with Great Western Highway at Ashfield, and continuing southwest through Picton, Mittagong, Goulburn, Yass and Gundagai to Albury). With the passing of the Main Roads (Amendment) Act of 1929 to provide for additional declarations of State Highways and Trunk Roads, this was amended to State Highway 2 on 8 April 1929. Great South Road was renamed Hume Highway later in 1928.

The western end of Main Road 178 (declared along Narellan Road), previously terminating at the intersection with Hume Highway at Narellan, was extended further west along it to terminate in Camden on 5 June 1974, resulting from the opening of Camden Bypass and the re-alignment of State Highway 2 (Hume Highway) along it. When the remaining section of South Western Freeway from Narellan Road in Macarthur to Yanderra opened in late 1980, the now-bypassed section of Hume Highway was renamed Camden Valley Way on 1 October 1982. Main Road 620 was declared along Camden Valley Way between Narellan and Prestons (and continuing south along Camden Bypass and through Picton and Bargo to Yanderra), when State Highway 2 was re-aligned again along South Western Freeway, on 24 October 1984.

The passing of the Roads Act of 1993 updated road classifications and the way they could be declared within New South Wales. Under this act, Camden Valley Way retains its declaration as part of Main Roads 178 (Narellan to Camden) and 620 (Casula to Narellan).

As part of Hume Highway, the route was allocated National Route 31 in 1954 for its entire length. When the Camden Bypass opened, this was diverted along it, leaving the section between Narellan and Camden unallocated. The Whitlam government introduced the federal National Roads Act 1974, where roads declared as a National Highway were still the responsibility of the states for road construction and maintenance, but were fully compensated by the Federal government for money spent on approved projects. As an important interstate link between the capitals of New South Wales and Victoria, the Hume Highway was declared a National Highway in 1974, and the section between Casula and Narellan was re-designated National Highway 31. When the remaining section of South Western Freeway between Macarthur and Yanderra was open in late 1980, National Highway 31 was re-allocated along it; the former alignment between Prestons and Camden was allocated State Route 89. Camden Valley Way was allocated part of Metroad 5 between the interchange with South Western Freeway and Hume Highway in 1992, then replaced by Metroad 7 when Casula bypass was opened in 1994. With the conversion to the newer alphanumeric system in 2013, Metroad 7 was replaced by route A28, while State Route 89 was abolished.

== Major intersections ==
| LGA | Location | km | mi | Destinations | Notes |
|---|---|---|---|---|---|
| Liverpool–Campbelltown boundary | Casula–Glenfield boundary | 0.0 | 0.0 | Hume Highway (A28) – Liverpool | Crossroads intersection Northeastern terminus of road |
| Liverpool–Campbelltown boundary | Casula–Glenfield boundary | 0.0 | 0.0 | Campbelltown Road – Campbelltown | |
| Liverpool | Casula–Prestons–Edmondson Park tripoint | 1.0 | 0.62 | Hume Motorway (M31) – Kingsgrove, Mittagong, Goulburn | No southbound entrance to Hume Motorway, southbound entrance to be via Campbelltown Road |
| Liverpool | Casula–Prestons–Edmondson Park tripoint | 1.0 | 0.62 | Westlink M7 (M7 north) – Eastern Creek, Rooty Hill, Seven Hills | Northbound entrance and southbound exit only |
| Liverpool | Casula–Prestons–Edmondson Park tripoint | 1.0 | 0.62 | South Western Motorway (M5) | No westbound exit from M5, westbound exit to be via Beech Road |
| Liverpool | Edmondson Park–Horningsea Park–Leppington tripoint | 4.6 | 2.9 | Bringelly Road (west) – Bringelly; Cowpasture Road (north) – Hoxton Park, Abbotsbury | |
| Camden | Harrington Park–Narellan boundary | 18.2 | 11.3 | The Northern Road (A9 north) – Luddenham, Kingsgrove, Windsor; Narellan Road (A9 south) – Campbelltown | |
| Camden | Camden | 23.1 | 14.4 | Murray Street – Camden South | |
| Camden | Camden | 23.1 | 14.4 | Cawdor Road – Cawdor, Razorback | Southwestern terminus of road |
Incomplete access; Tolled; Route transition

== See also ==
- Highways in Australia
- List of highways in New South Wales
