= Bargo railway station =

Railway station in New South Wales, Australia

Bargo
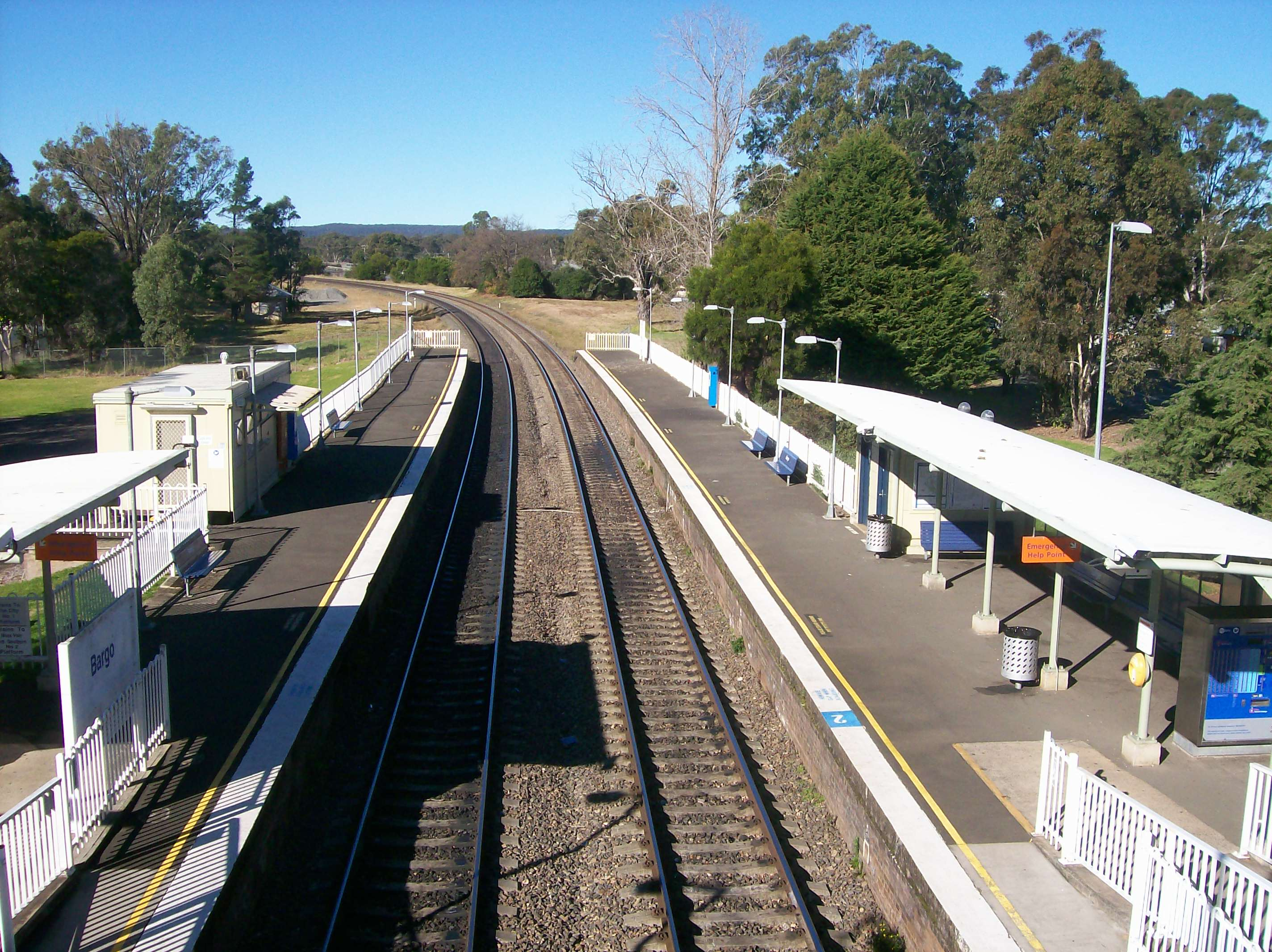
- Southbound view of station platforms, January 2006

General information
- Location: Old Hume Highway, Bargo; Australia
- Coordinates: 34°17′28″S 150°34′48″E
- Elevation: 340 metres (1,120 ft)
- Owner: Transport Asset Manager of New South Wales
- Operator: Sydney Trains
- Line: Main Southern
- Distance: 102.87 kilometres (63.92 mi) from Central
- Platforms: 2 side
- Tracks: 2
- Connections: Bus

Construction
- Structure type: Ground

Other information
- Status: Weekdays: Staffed: 5.35am to 1.35am: Weekends and public holidays: Unstaffed
- Station code: BZG
- Website: Transport for NSW

History
- Opened: 13 July 1919
- Former names: West Bargo (1919–1921)

Passengers
- 2025: 24,352 (year); 67 (daily) (Sydney Trains, NSW TrainLink)

Services
Preceding station	Intercity Trains	Following station
Yerrinbool towards Moss Vale or Goulburn	Southern Highlands Line	Tahmoor towards Campbelltown or Central
Former services
Preceding station	Former services	Following station
Yanderra towards Albury	Main Southern Line	Tahmoor towards Sydney
Location

Bargo railway station is located on the Main Southern line in New South Wales, Australia. It serves the town of Bargo, opening on 13 July 1919 as West Bargo at the same time as a new alignment between Picton and Mittagong. It was renamed Bargo on 1 November 1921.

== Platforms and services ==
Bargo has two side platforms. It is serviced by Sydney Trains Southern Highlands Line services travelling between Campbelltown and Moss Vale with 2 weekend morning services to Sydney Central and limited evening services to Goulburn.

Platform	Line	Stopping pattern	Notes
1	SHL	services to Campbelltown; 2 weekend morning services to Sydney Central	
2	SHL	services to Moss Vale evening services to Goulburn (2 weekday, 1 weekend)	

== Transport links ==
Picton Buslines operate two routes via Bargo station:

- 911: to Buxton & Picton
- 912: Yanderra to Picton

Berrima Buslines operate one route that serves Bargo station:

- 806: to Mittagong
