= Aylmerton, New South Wales =

Aylmerton
- Town
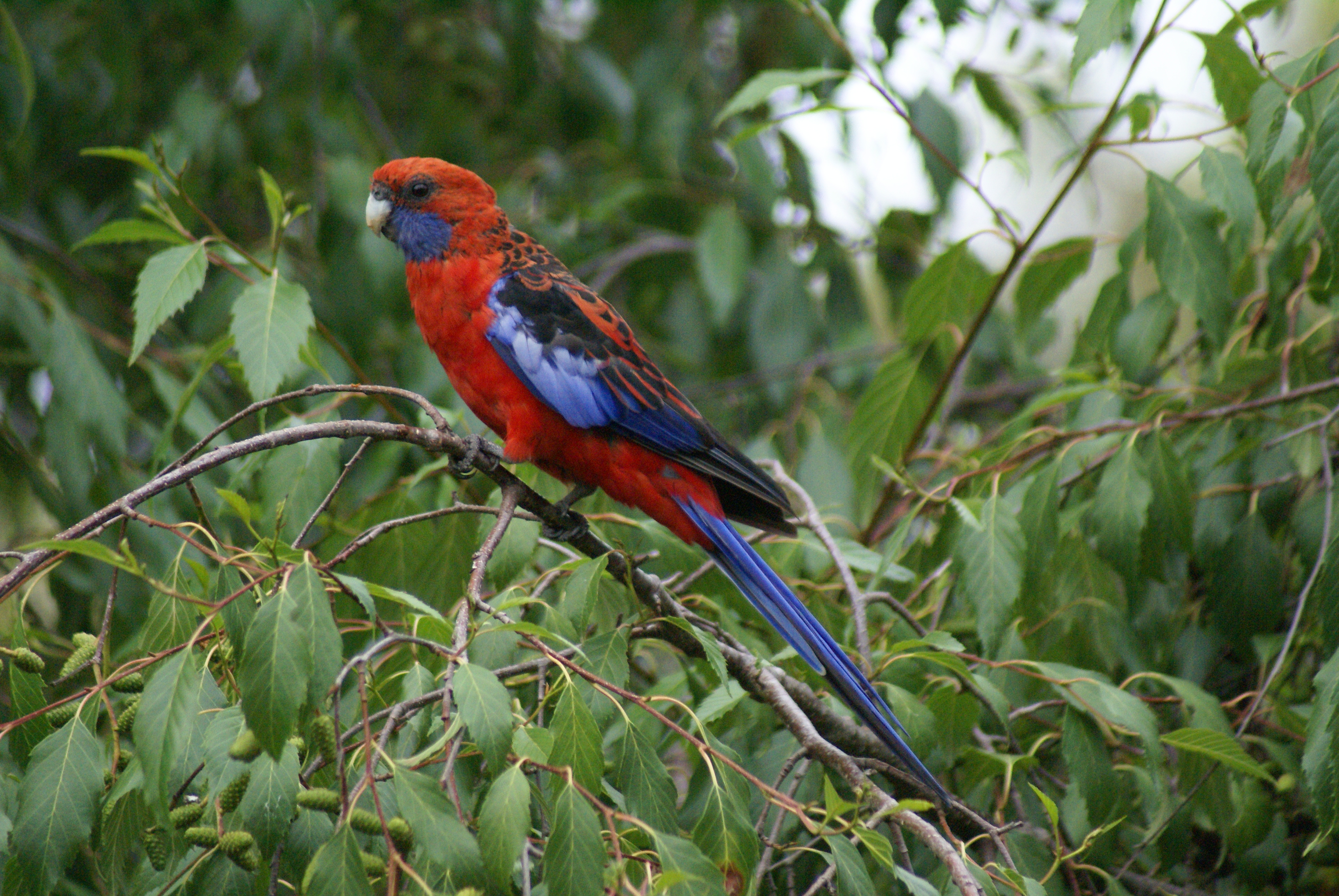

- Coordinates: 34°25′10″S 150°29′45″E
- Country: Australia
- State: New South Wales
- Region: Southern Highlands
- LGA: Wingecarribee Shire
- Location: 7 km (4.3 mi) NE of Mittagong; 120 km (75 mi) SW of Sydney

Government
  - State electorate: Goulburn
  - Federal division: Whitlam
- Elevation: 603 m (1,978 ft)

Population
  - Total: 195 (SAL 2021)
- Postcode: 2575
- County: Camden
- Parish: Mittagong
Localities around Aylmerton
Colo Vale	Alpine	Alpine
Colo Vale	Aylmerton	Mittagong
Braemar	Balaclava	Mittagong

Aylmerton (/ˈeɪlməˌtɪn/) is a Northern Village of the Southern Highlands of New South Wales, Australia in the Wingecarribee Shire. It is located north-east of Mittagong. The only buildings in Aylmerton are a fire station and houses, many of which are on farms.

There is also an Aylmerton in Norfolk, England.

== Transport ==
Aylmerton is positioned between the Hume Highway on its northwestern side and the Main South railway line on its southeastern side. They are the main road and rail routes between Sydney and Melbourne.

The village was served by Aylmerton railway station between 1919, with the opening of the Double Line Deviation between Picton and Mittagong, and 1975.

== Industry ==
Near the demolished train station is a small industrial zone, which is part of Braemar. It contains a few industrial complexes and a Bunnings Hardware Store.

== Population ==
According to the 2021 census, the population of Aylmerton was 195. At the 2016 census, there were 194 people living in Aylmerton.
