= Mittagong Parish =

- Cadastral division
- Country: Australia
- State: New South Wales
- Region: Southern Highlands
- LGA: Wingecarribee
- County: Camden
- Division: Eastern
Lands administrative divisions around Mittagong Parish
Jellore	Colo	Colo
Berrima	Mittagong Parish	Burke
Bong Bong	Yarrunga	Kangaloon

The Parish of Mittagong is a parish of the County of Camden in the Southern Highlands region of New South Wales. It includes the town of Bowral and the southern parts of Mittagong.

== Overview ==
The Old Hume Highway is the boundary in the north, including the section which runs through Mittagong, so that the part of Mittagong south of the Old Hume highway is in Mittagong parish, with most of the northern portion in the Parish of Colo. The exception is Welby (formerly the village of Fitzroy) at 34°26′26″S 150°25′32″E which is almost cut off from the rest of the parish, located between the old and new Hume Highways. This is a rectangular portion of land with only one corner touching the main part of the parish, along the Gibbergunyah creek. The current Hume Highway runs somewhat to the north of the parish. The Southern Highlands railway line passes through the parish, including the stations of Burradoo, Bowral and Mittagong.

The Nepean River is the boundary in the east. The Wingecarribee River is the boundary of the parish in the south. Kangaloon road runs through the parish with Kangaloon on the parish's south-eastern edge. Glenquarry is also located in the southern area of the parish, along with the Wingecarribee swamp.

In 1827 land on portion 73 in the Parish of Mittagong was used for the building of an inn by George Cutler. In 1834 Elizabeth Sheckell, the widow of William Charker, received a grant for 200 acres (0.81 km^{2}) of land on portion 35 of the Parish of Mittagong. Old parish maps record that the parish was extended to an area to the west of Bowral with an "extension to Municipality of Bowral Proclaimed 25th February 1890".
