= Bargo Parish =

- Cadastral division
- Coordinates: 34°18′S 150°35′E
- Country: Australia
- State: New South Wales
- LGAs: Wollondilly; Wingecarribee
- County: Camden
- Division: Eastern
Lands administrative divisions around Bargo Parish
Couridjah	Couridjah	Wilton
Cumbertine	Bargo Parish	Banksia
Cumbertine	Colo	Banksia

The Parish of Bargo is a parish of the County of Camden in New South Wales. Its seat is the village of Bargo. The Main Southern railway line passes through the parish, including the Bargo station. The Hume Highway also passes through the parish, where it intersects Avon Dam Road, and also by the Pheasants Nest roadhouse.

Lake Nepean and the Nepean River are the boundaries to the east, while the Bargo River is the boundary to the west. Forest Creek is the boundary to the south.
