= Yerrinbool railway station =

Railway station in New South Wales, Australia

Yerrinbool
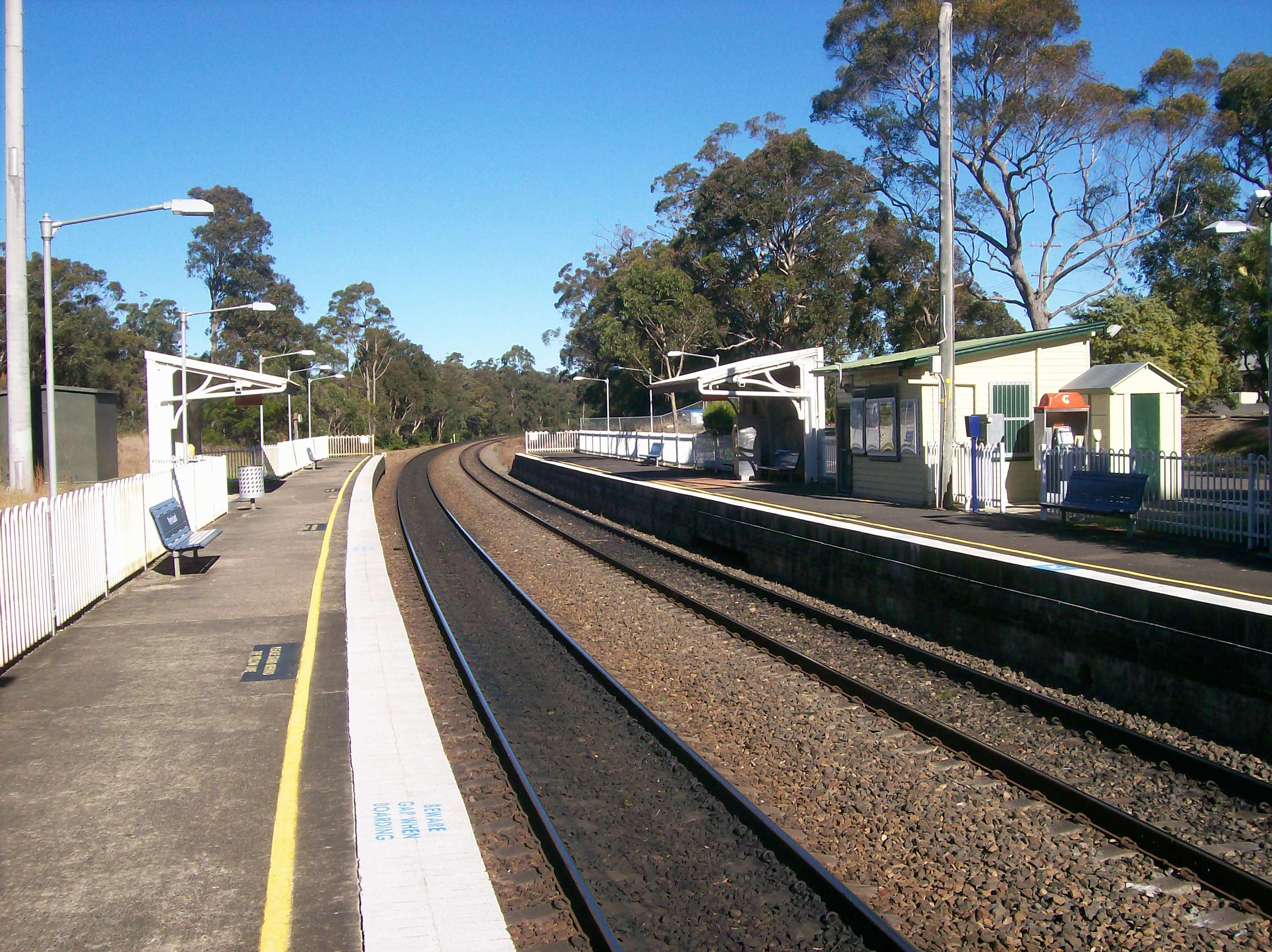
- Southbound view from Platform 2, January 2006

General information
- Location: Old Hume Highway, Yerrinbool; Australia
- Coordinates: 34°22′18″S 150°32′37″E
- Elevation: 487 metres (1,598 ft)
- Owner: Transport Asset Manager of New South Wales
- Operator: Sydney Trains
- Line: Main Southern
- Distance: 116.31 kilometres (72.27 mi) from Central
- Platforms: 2 side
- Tracks: 2
- Connections: Bus

Other information
- Station code: YEB
- Website: Transport for NSW

History
- Opened: 13 July 1919

Passengers
- 2025: 7,729 (year); 21 (daily) (Sydney Trains, NSW TrainLink)

Services
Preceding station	Intercity Trains	Following station
Mittagong towards Moss Vale or Goulburn	Southern Highlands Line	Bargo towards Campbelltown or Central
Former services
Preceding station	Former services	Following station
Aylmerton towards Albury	Main Southern Line (1919-1924)	Bargo towards Sydney
Aylmerton towards Albury	Main Southern Line (1924-1975)	Yanderra towards Sydney
Location

Yerrinbool railway station is located on the Main Southern line in New South Wales, Australia. It serves the town of Yerrinbool, opening on 13 July 1919 at the same time as a new alignment between Picton and Mittagong. In March 1991, the weatherboard building on Platform 1 was demolished.

== Platforms and services ==
Yerrinbool has two side platforms. It is serviced by Sydney Trains Southern Highlands Line services travelling between Campbelltown and Moss Vale with 2 weekend morning services to Sydney Central and limited evening services to Goulburn.

Platform	Line	Stopping pattern	Notes
1	SHL	services to Campbelltown; 2 weekend morning services to Sydney Central	
2	SHL	services to Moss Vale evening services to Goulburn (2 weekday, 1 weekend)	

== Transport links ==
Berrima Buslines operate one route that serves Yerrinbool station:

- 806: Mittagong to Bargo
