= Yass Valley Way =

Road in Australia

Yass Valley Way New South Wales
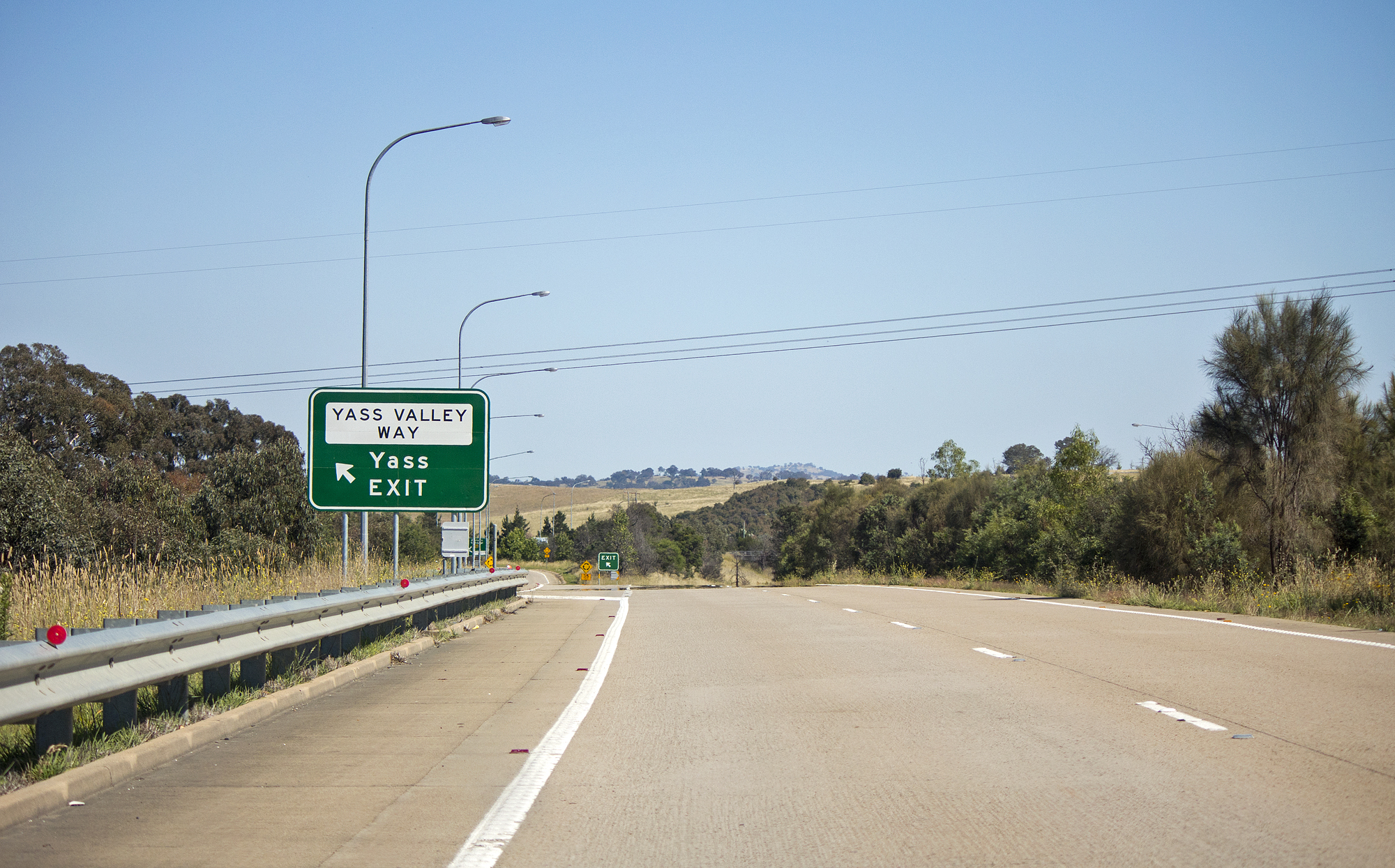
- Exit to the Yass Valley Way from the Barton Highway

General information
- Type: Road
- Length: 18 km (11 mi)
- Opened: Early 1990s, completed 1995
- Former route number: (unknown–early 1990s)

Major junctions
- West end: Hume Motorway; Yass, New South Wales
- Barton Highway
- East end: Hume Motorway; Manton, New South Wales

Yass Valley Way is the main road which links Yass, New South Wales to the Hume Highway (to Sydney and Melbourne) and to the Barton Highway (to Canberra) in Australia. The road is about 18 km long and runs parallel to the Yass River. It was created when the Hume Highway bypass of Yass was built in the early 1990s. This cleared the massive traffic bottleneck that plagued Yass due to the passing interstate traffic. After the completion of the bypass, local traffic predominates.

== See also ==
- List of highways in New South Wales
- Highways in Australia
- Old Hume Highway
