= Yerrinbool, New South Wales =

Yerrinbool
- Town
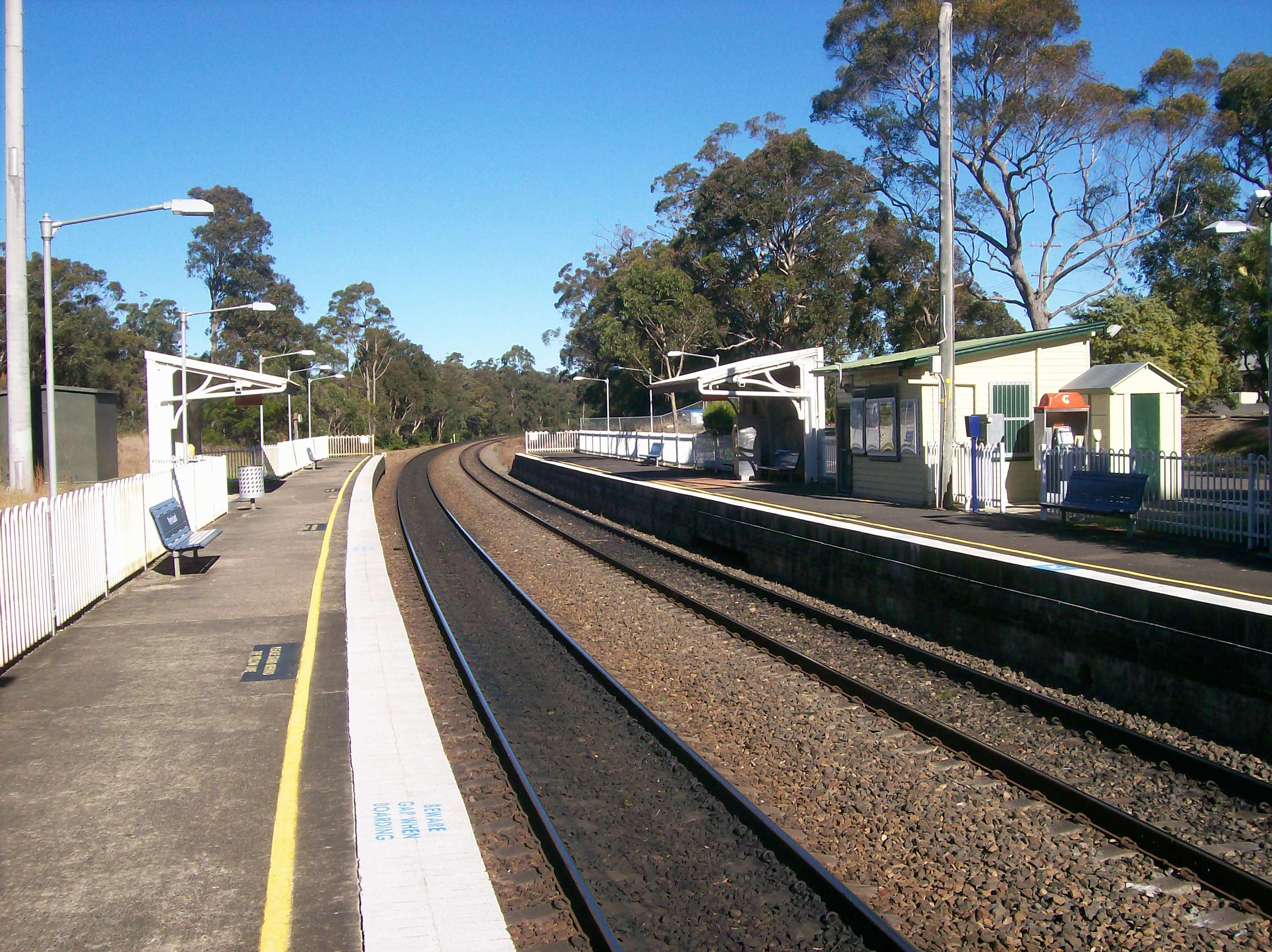
- Yerrinbool station

- Coordinates: 34°22′S 150°33′E
- Country: Australia
- State: New South Wales
- Region: Southern Highlands
- LGA: Wingecarribee Shire
- Location: 117 km (73 mi) south-west of Sydney; 12 km (7.5 mi) north-east of Mittagong
- Established: 1919

Government
  - State electorate: Wollondilly
  - Federal division: Whitlam
- Elevation: 488 m (1,601 ft)

Population
  - Total: 974 (UCL 2021)
- Postcode: 2575
- County: Camden
- Parish: Colo
Localities around Yerrinbool
Balmoral	Yanderra
Hill Top	Yerrinbool	Upper Nepean Nature Reserve
Colo Vale	Alpine

Yerrinbool is one of the Northern Villages of the Southern Highlands of New South Wales, Australia, in the Wingecarribee Shire. Yerrinbool is accessible from the Hume Highway (via Bargo or Alpine) and is about a 12 km (7.5 mi) drive from nearby Mittagong. It is 7 km (4.3 mi) to Hill Top as the crow flies, accessible by foot via a fire trail. It is on the western edge of the Upper Nepean Nature Reserve, a vast area of forest, lakes and dams between Yerrinbool and the coastal communities around Wollongong (accessible by a circuitous 63 km (39 mi) by-road). Yerrinbool was previously officially known as the Town of Yerrinbool. It is located along the historic Old Hume Highway.

== Facilities ==
Yerrinbool railway station is served by the NSW TrainLink Southern Highlands Line. In 2018, a group of community volunteers established the Railway Garden as a rest area for travellers and a meeting place for locals and tourists to enjoy.

The Yerrinbool General Store, across the road from the station, closed in 2014. Community facilities include a community hall, fire station, public toilets, an Anzac memorial and Yerrinbool Oval, which contains a skate park, soccer field and grassed sports area. Located on the northern outskirts of the town is the Tennessee Orchard, the main crop being apples.

Yerrinbool's sporting field is home ground for the joint Yerrinbool-Bargo soccer team, the Yerrinbool-Bargo Bushrangers. The Bushrangers are part of the Highlands Soccer Association and field a team in the Highlands Competition.

The village is home to the Yerrinbool Bahá’í Centre of Learning, a Haziratu'l-Quds of the Baháʼí Faith, which includes a library, assembly hall, classrooms, meeting rooms, dining hall and a number of small accommodation buildings for people using the facilities for Bahá’í studies, for meetings by other organisations, or as a pilgrims' hostel. See Baháʼí Faith in Australia.

== Attractions ==
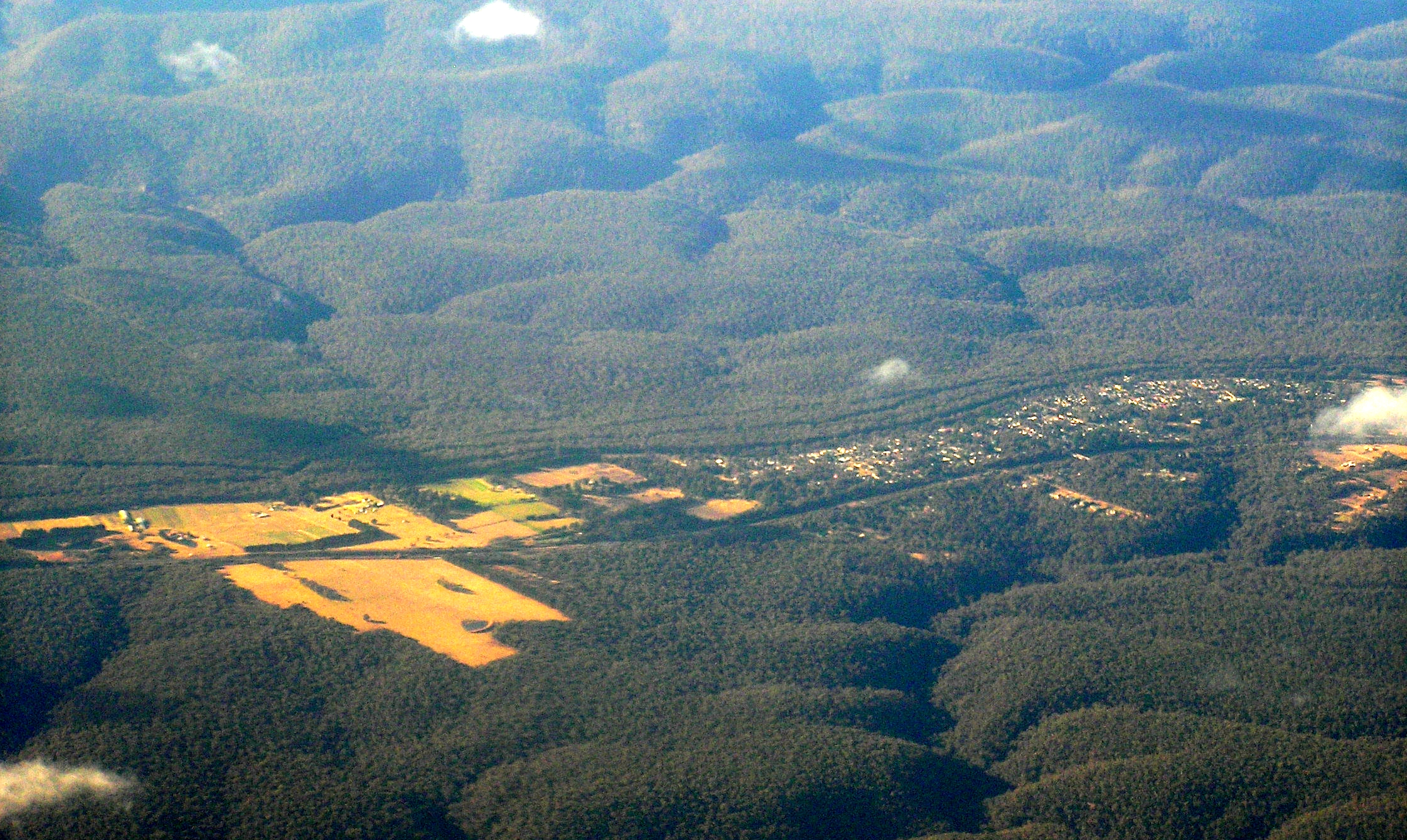
Aerial view from north-west

Yerrinbool is distinguished as the town with the "Welcome to the Southern Highlands" sign, as it is the first town of the Southern Highlands on the Hume Highway coming from Sydney.

Yerrinbool can also be distinguished by the Tennessee Orchard Sign, which has a large, round red apple on it. The bright sign can be seen when traveling past the village on the Hume Highway.

== History ==
The name Yerrinbool is an Aboriginal word for the Wood Duck — a common species around the ponds of Yerrinbool. Prior to settlement, Yerrinbool was known as "Little Forest".

On 13 July 1919, Yerrinbool railway station, along with the now closed Aylmerton Station, was officially open for use on the Main South Line. It was built on the new train line between Mittagong and Picton to replace what is known today as the disused Picton Loop Railway Line. The newer line was built to ease steep grades of the original line, which caused heavy train traffic at Picton Station. With the line and station now operating, the village was laid out, with two early land sales of Yerrinbool Station Estate on 6 October 1919 and 1 January 1920.

Yerrinbool Post Office opened on 1 December 1919 upon the arrival of the railway, and closed in 1977. The Yerrinbool General Store was built and opened in 1921 along with a saw-mill, which has since been demolished.

On 20 August 1922, a school was opened with 30 students enrolled. However, the school building was burnt down in a fire in the 1970s and was not rebuilt. The community hall was built in March, 1938 by local voluntary labour.

The Yerrinbool Baháʼí School was first opened in May 1937 as a Baháʼí Summer School, providing a reading room and retreat for practitioners of the Baháʼí Faith. It is known as the Yerrinbool Baháʼí Centre of Learning.

== Population ==
According to the census in 1954, Yerrinbool had 50 dwellings with a population of 150. At the 2016 census, Yerrinbool had a population of 1,164, while at the 2021 census, 1,196 people were recorded.

== Heritage listings ==
Yerrinbool has a number of heritage-listed sites, including:

- Avon Dam Road or fire trails: Nepean Dam (reservoir)
