= Alpine, New South Wales =

Alpine
- Town
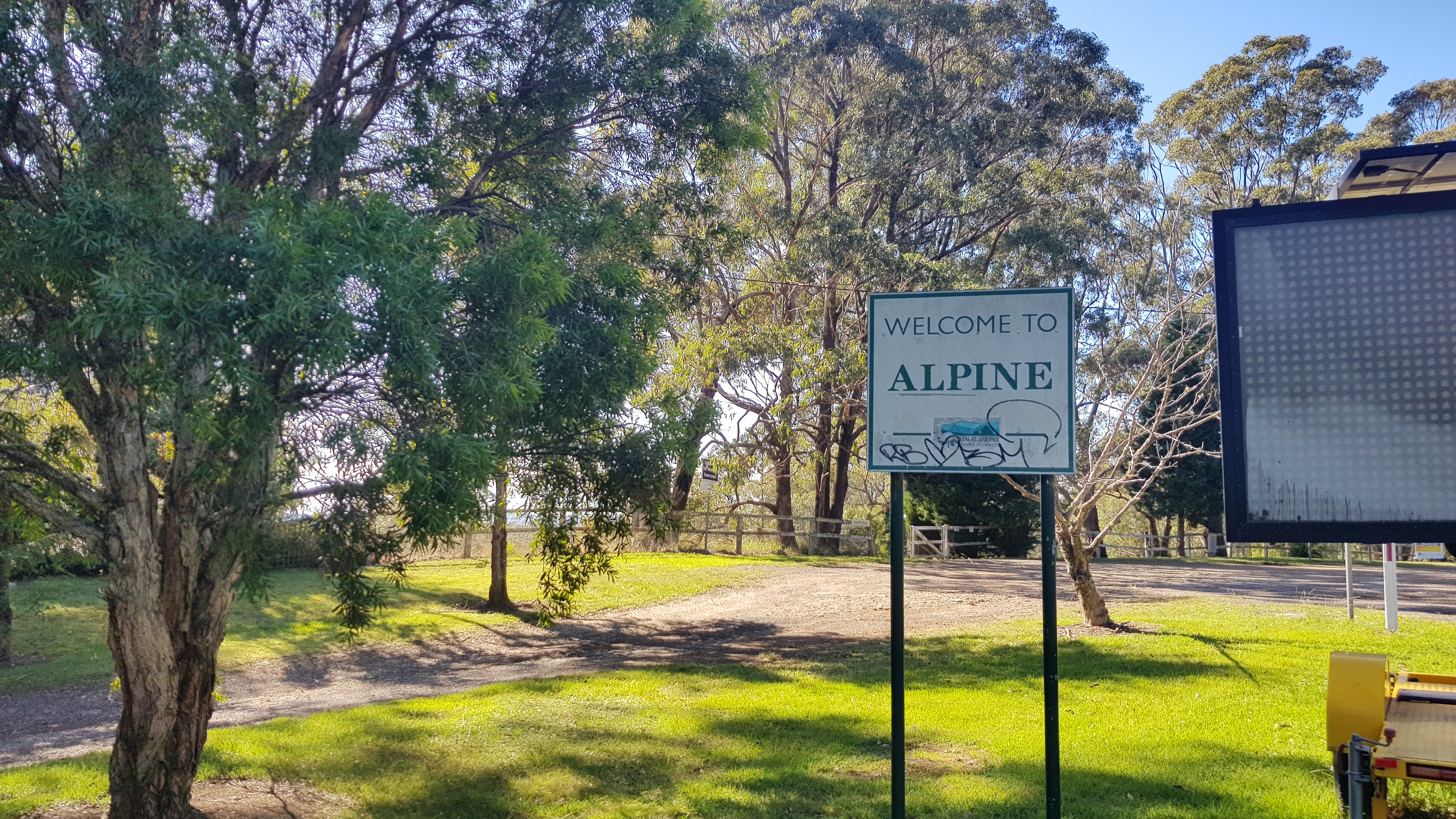
- Old Hume Highway, 2023

- Coordinates: 34°24′21″S 150°30′33″E
- Country: Australia
- State: New South Wales
- Region: Southern Highlands
- LGA: Wingecarribee Shire
- Location: 120 km (75 mi) South-West of Sydney CBD; 9 km (5.6 mi) NE of Mittagong; 7 km (4.3 mi) S of Yerrinbool

Government
  - State electorate: Goulburn
  - Federal division: Whitlam
- Elevation: 615 m (2,018 ft)

Population
  - Total: 141 (SAL 2021)
- Postcode: 2575
- County: Camden
- Parish: Colo
Localities around Alpine
	Yerrinbool
Colo Vale	Alpine	Upper Nepean Catchment Area
	Aylmerton

Alpine (/ˈælpiːn/) is a Northern Village of the Southern Highlands of New South Wales, Australia, in the Wingecarribee Shire. It is located north-east of Aylmerton and south of Yerrinbool. The Main Southern Line passes through the locality, and the Hume Highway runs along the western boundary. The Old South Road, an early precursor to the Hume Highway, runs through the centre of the locality, separating the rural western side from the Upper Nepean Catchment Area, which is heavily forested.

== Population ==
According to the 2021 census, the population of Alpine was 141. At the 2016 census, there were 54 living in Alpine.
