= Colo Vale, New South Wales =

Colo Vale
- Town
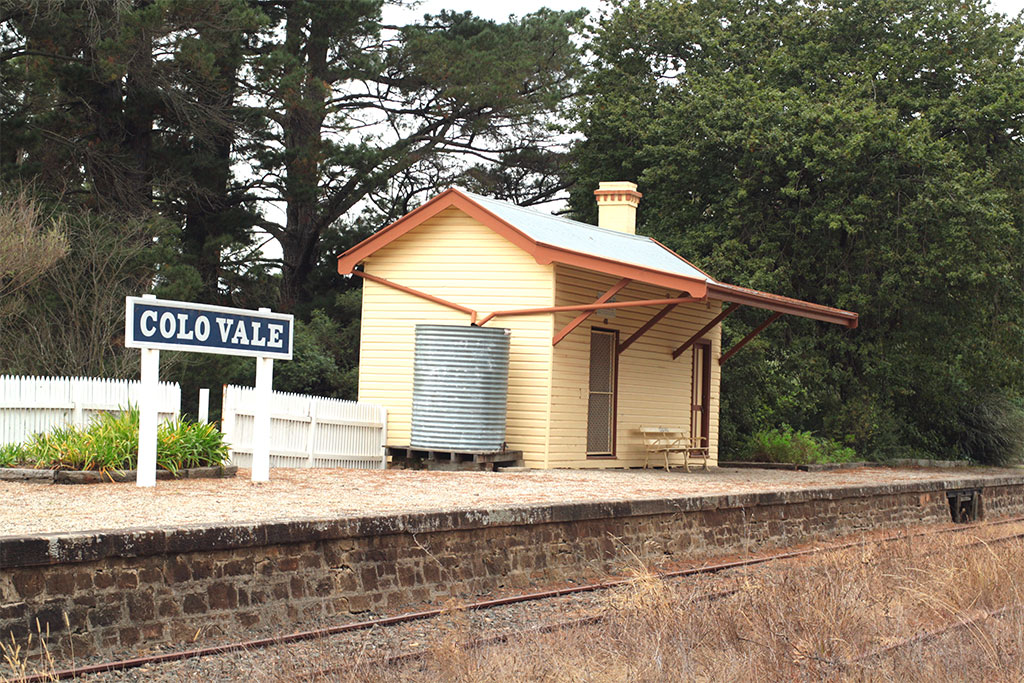
- Colo Vale Railway Station located on the Old Picton Loop Line

- Coordinates: 34°24′S 150°29′E
- Country: Australia
- State: New South Wales
- Region: Southern Highlands
- LGA: Wingecarribee Shire
- Location: 125 km (78 mi) South-West of Sydney CBD; 10 km (6.2 mi) N of Mittagong
- Established: 1837

Government
  - State electorate: Wollondilly
  - Federal division: Whitlam
- Elevation: 642 m (2,106 ft)

Population
  - Total: 1,528 (UCL 2021)
- Postcode: 2575
- County: Camden
- Parish: Colo
Localities around Colo Vale
	Hill Top	Yerrinbool
Nattai National Park	Colo Vale	Alpine
	Braemar

Colo Vale (/ˈkɒloʊ veɪl/) is a Northern Village of the Southern Highlands of New South Wales, Australia, in Wingecarribee Shire. Colo Vale is approximately 100 km south west on the Hume Highway from Sydney. It is situated 2 km north-west of Aylmerton, 5 km from the Hume Highway and 12 km drive to Mittagong. The surrounding area is part of the Parish of Colo which includes the villages of Aylmerton, Willow Vale, Alpine and Yerrinbool. Colo Vale has a mixed-business general store and many home-based businesses, including hairdressers, small manufacturing businesses and a large native plant nursery (Wariapendi Nursery) and a Public School on Wattle Street. A large sporting oval is located adjacent to the school with tennis courts, a community hall and a Rural Fire Service station.

== History ==
The village was formerly a station on the Main Southern Railway. During the early 1860s, increased settlement occurred due to the rich soil which derived from decomposing volcanic rock. St. Pauls Anglican Church which still stands today was built in 1884. This operates as a branch church of Mittagong Anglican Church. The railway line was deviated in 1919 to a less steep alignment with easier grades and the original line became the Picton Loop line. Colo Vale railway station, though disused, has been restored and is in good condition. The word Colo is believed to be an Aboriginal word for "a hill formed by volcanic rock”. In 1837 when John Kiernan purchased some land where modern Colo Vale is, he called it Colo. This name became the official Parish name for the area.The first school was built in 1911. In 1923, Colo Vale was settled by English migrant poultry farmers. In 1954, Colo Vale had a population of 121 with 37 dwellings.

== Population ==
In the 2016 census, there were 1,618 people in Colo Vale. 83.9% of people were born in Australia and 90.4% of people spoke only English at home. The most common responses for religion were Anglican 25.0%, No Religion 24.7% and Catholic 23.4%. At the 2021 census, the population had increased to 1,775.

== Photo gallery ==
Images of Colo Vale

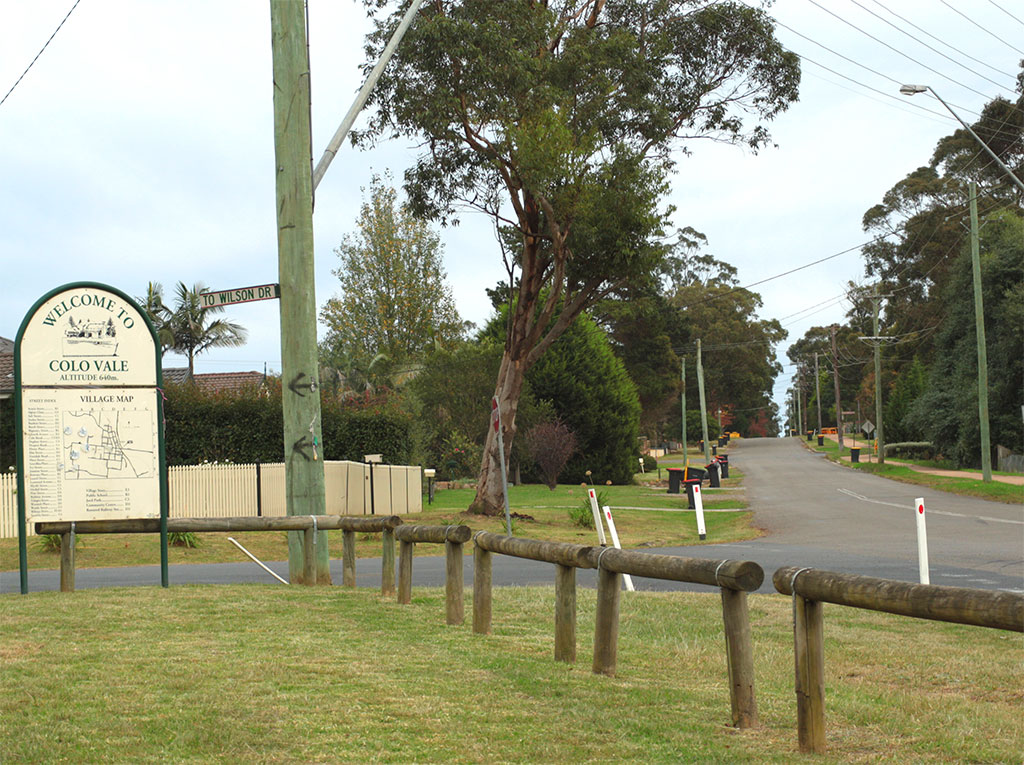
Town Entry Sign, Wattle Street

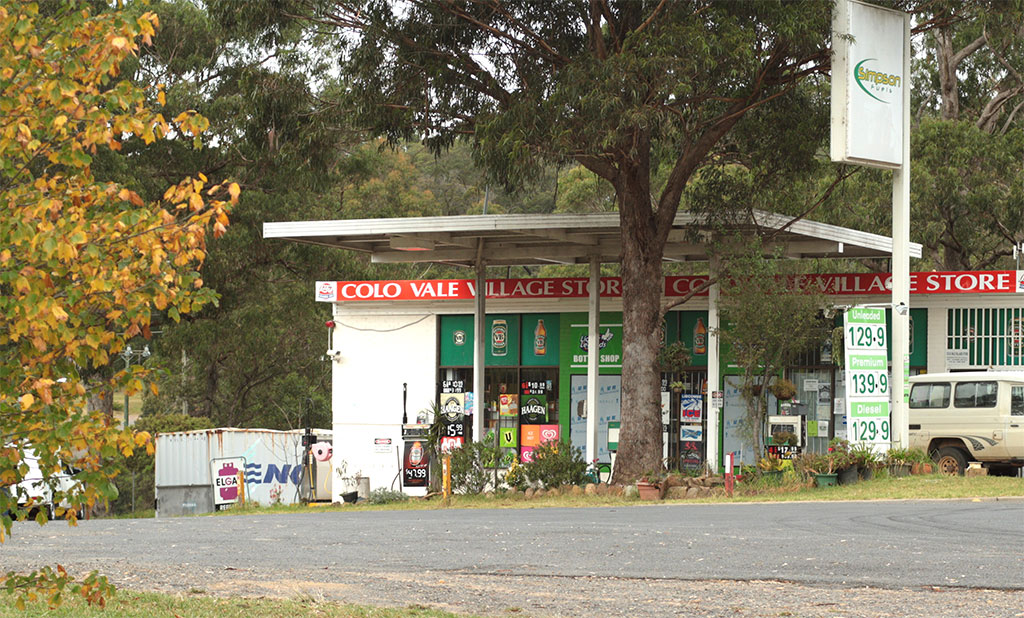
Village Store, Railway Street

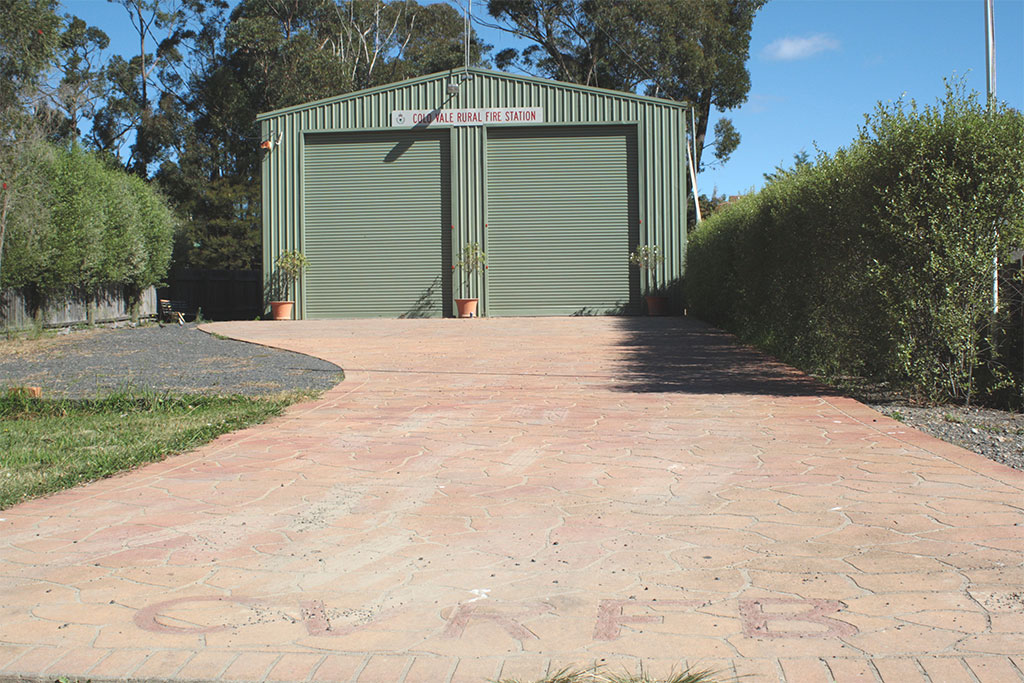
Rural Fire Service Shed, Banksia Street

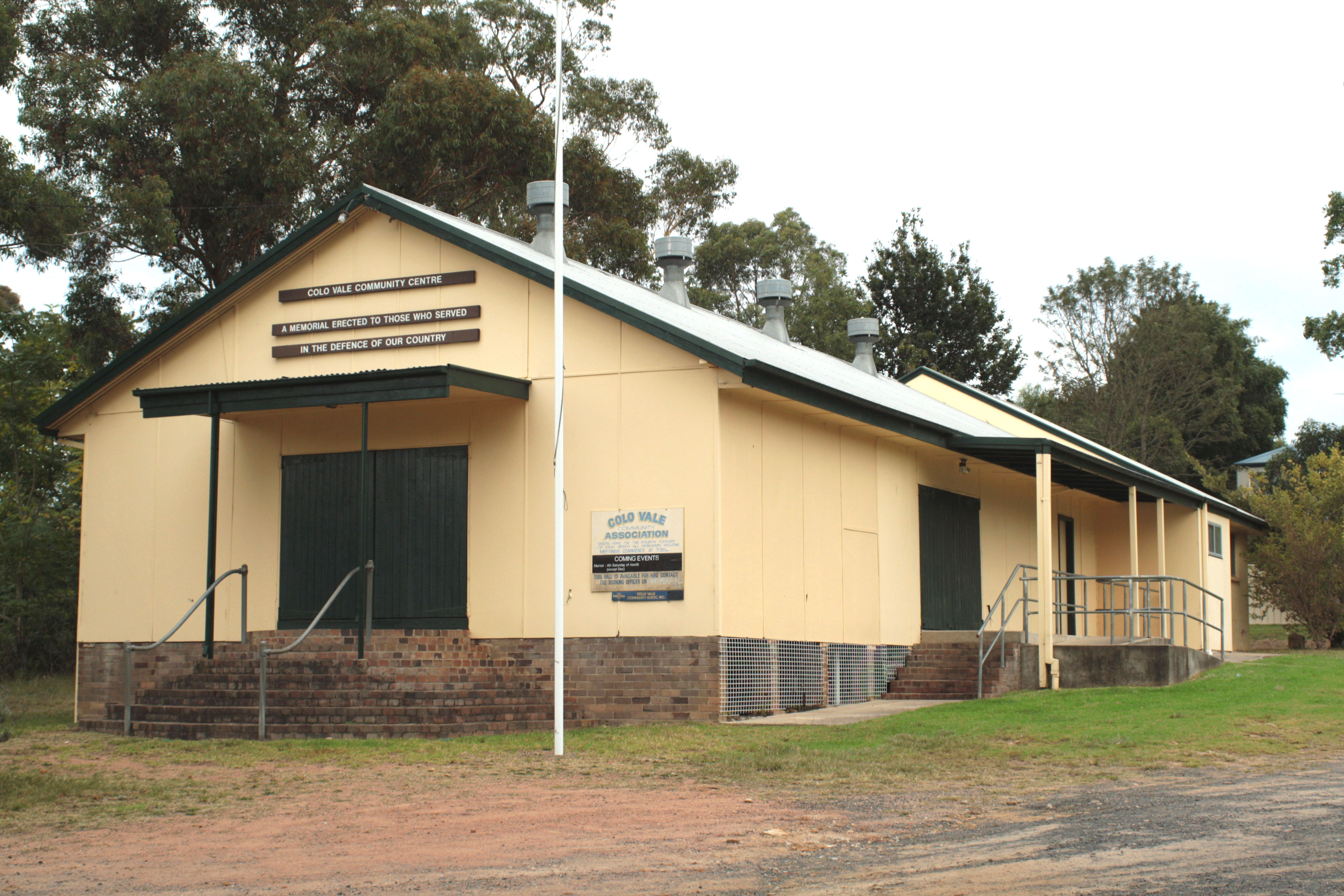
War Memorial Hall, Railway Street

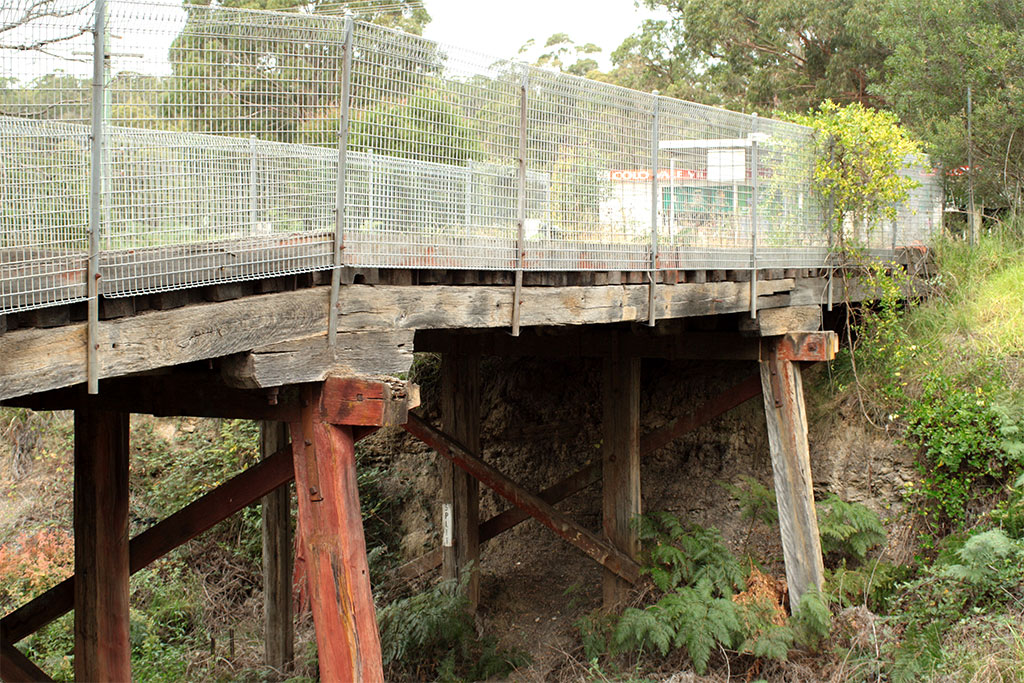
Road overbridge, closed

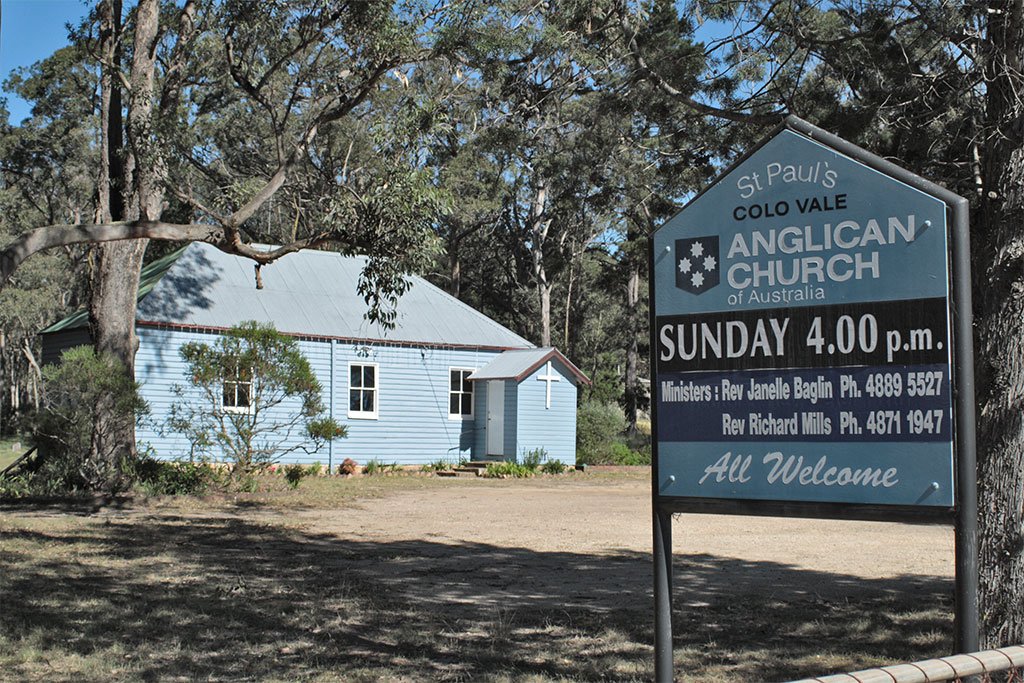
St Paul's Anglican Church, Church Ave

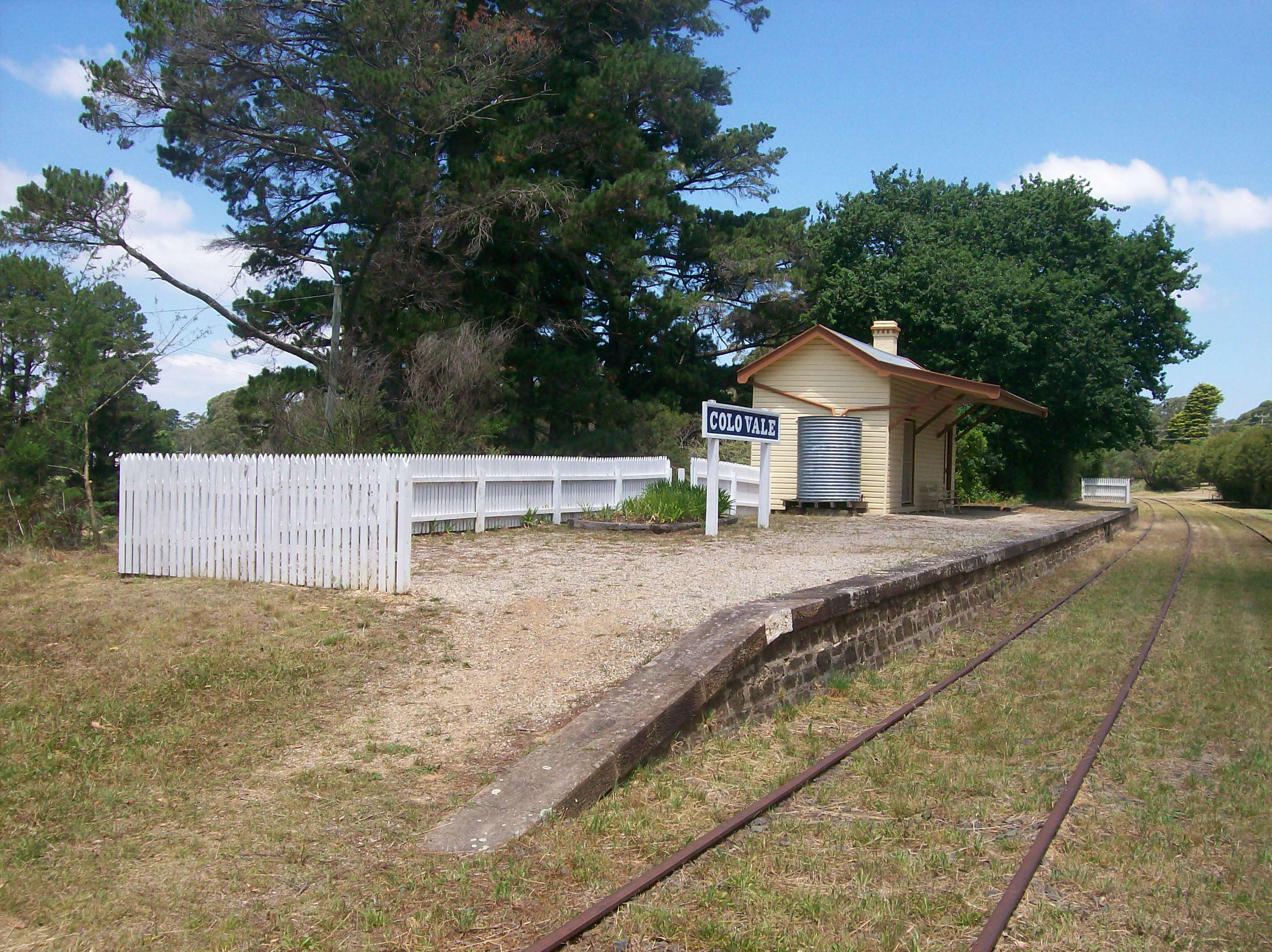
Colo Vale Heritage Train Station
