= Mittagong railway station =

Railway station in New South Wales, Australia

Mittagong
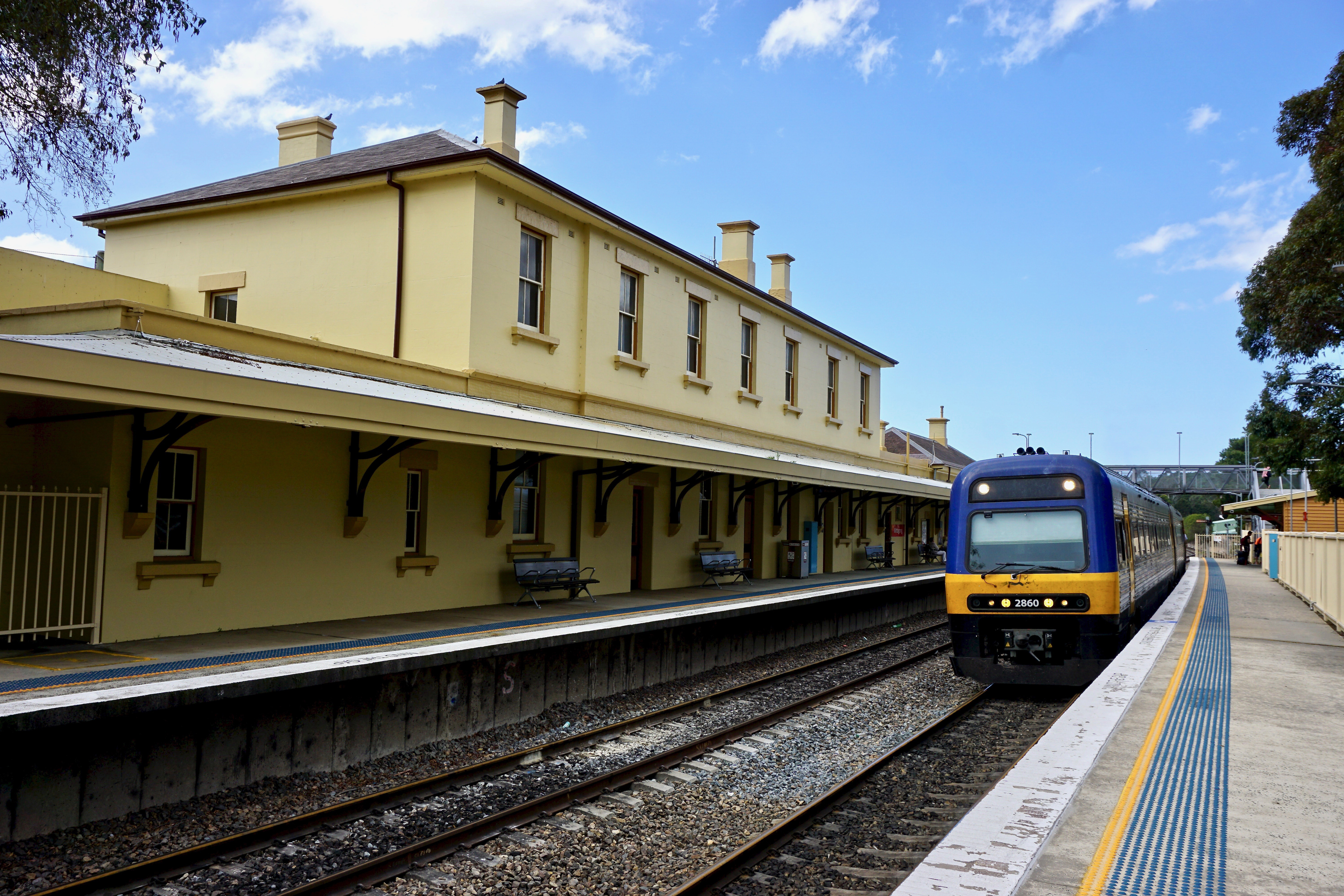
- Northbound view from Platform 2, with an Endeavour railcar arriving at the station, September 2018

General information
- Location: Regent Street, Mittagong; Australia
- Coordinates: 34°27′09″S 150°26′54″E
- Elevation: 634 metres (2,080 ft)
- Owner: Transport Asset Manager of New South Wales
- Operator: Sydney Trains
- Line: Main Southern
- Distance: 131.57 kilometres (81.75 mi) from Central
- Platforms: 2 side
- Tracks: 2
- Connections: Bus

Construction
- Structure type: Ground
- Accessible: yes

Other information
- Status: Weekdays: Staffed: 5:15am to 5:45pm: Weekends and public holidays: Unstaffed
- Station code: MIT
- Website: Transport for NSW

History
- Opened: 1 March 1867

Passengers
- 2025: 82,455 (year); 226 (daily) (Sydney Trains, NSW TrainLink)

Services
Preceding station	Intercity Trains	Following station
Bowral towards Moss Vale or Goulburn	Southern Highlands Line	Yerrinbool towards Campbelltown or Central
Preceding station	NSW TrainLink	Following station
Bowral towards Griffith or Canberra	NSW TrainLink Southern Line Griffith and Canberra Xplorers	Campbelltown towards Sydney
Former services
Preceding station	Former services	Following station
Bowral towards Albury	Main Southern Line (1919–1975)	Aylmerton towards Sydney
Terminus	Picton–Mittagong Loop Line	Braemar towards Picton
Location

Mittagong railway station is a heritage-listed railway station on the Main Southern line in New South Wales, Australia. It serves the town of Mittagong in the Southern Highlands. It was added to the New South Wales State Heritage Register on 2 April 1999.

== History ==
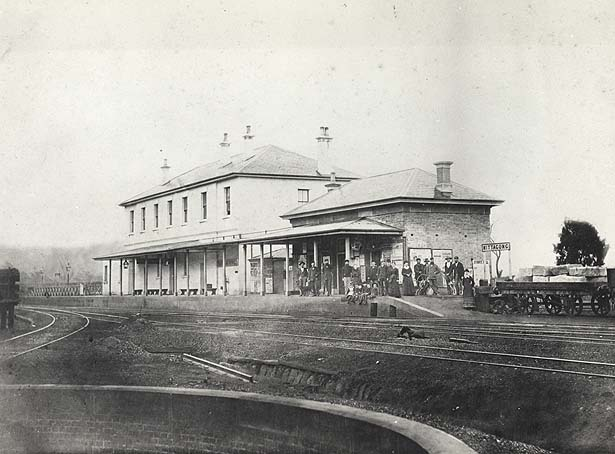
The station prior to duplication

The station opened on 1 March 1867.

The Platform 1 station building was erected in 1873 and the wooden structure on Platform 2 in 1919 when the line was duplicated.

== Platforms and services ==
Mittagong has two side platforms. It is serviced by Sydney Trains Southern Highlands Line services travelling between Campbelltown and Moss Vale with limited morning services to Sydney Central and limited evening services to Goulburn.

It is also serviced by NSW TrainLink Xplorer long-distance services from Sydney to Canberra and Griffith. This is a request stop for this service (except for Sydney-bound Canberra/Griffith Xplorer on Thursdays and Sundays), so the trains stop only if passengers booked to board/alight here.

Platform	Line	Stopping pattern	Notes
1	Southern Highlands Line	services to Campbelltown morning services to Sydney Central (1 weekday, 2 weekend)	
1	Southern Region	services to Sydney Central	request stop (booked passengers only) (except for Sydney-bound Canberra/Griffith Xplorer on Thursdays and Sundays)
2	Southern Highlands Line	services to Moss Vale evening services to Goulburn (2 weekday, 1 weekend)	
2	Southern Region	services to Canberra & Griffith	request stop (booked passengers only)

== Transport links ==
Berrima Buslines operate four routes via Mittagong station:

- 806: Bowral to Bargo
- 811: to Moss Vale
- 816: to Moss Vale

Berrima Buslines operate one route for NSW TrainLink via Mittagong station:

- Loopline Bus: Bowral station to Picton station

== Description ==
The former station complex consists of two station buildings: a brick second-class station building of type 3 design (1870) on platform 1 and a timber skillion roof building with return canopy of type 7 design (1867 with 1873 and 1915 additions) on platform 2, both with brick-faced platforms. The former refreshment rooms (1873) are also located on Platform 1.

The station has two one remaining signal box: a type 3 timber skillion roof platform level box (1919). A junction signal box was removed pre-2000. The goods shed (1915) is 60' x 40' of through shed sub-type 1 design. A steel and timber pedestrian footbridge (1920) links the platforms.

A 5-ton jib crane (T156) and Avery 10 tonne weighing machine were removed pre-2004.

== Heritage listing ==
Mittagong is an important early site with significant railway buildings. The location of the station near the centre of the town gives it a civic importance. Of particular interest is the refreshment room which was used only for a short period until replaced by the refreshment room at Moss Vale because the Governor who alighted at Moss Vale for his country residence did not want to be kept waiting at Mittagong while refreshments were taken. The station complex in particular is of high significance with an early railway building (1867) surviving in the group.

Mittagong railway station was listed on the New South Wales State Heritage Register on 2 April 1999.
