= Picton railway station =

Railway station in New South Wales, Australia

Picton
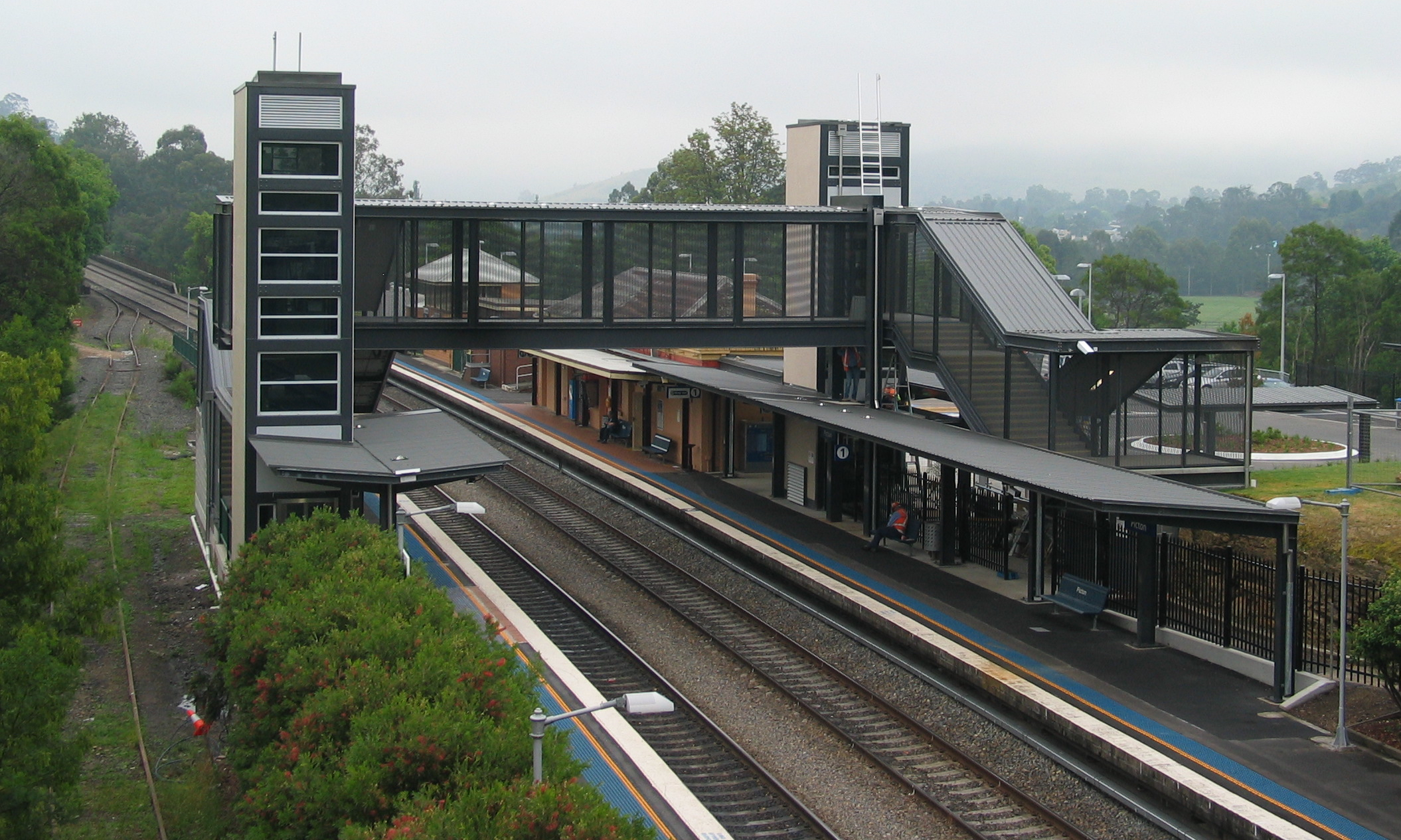
- Southbound view of station platforms, November 2011

General information
- Location: Station Street, Picton; Australia
- Coordinates: 34°10′45″S 150°36′45″E
- Elevation: 171 metres (561 ft)
- Owner: Transport Asset Manager of New South Wales
- Operator: Sydney Trains
- Line: Main Southern
- Distance: 85.24 kilometres (52.97 mi) from Central
- Platforms: 2 side
- Tracks: 2
- Connections: Bus

Construction
- Structure type: Ground
- Accessible: Yes

Other information
- Status: Weekdays: Staffed: 4am to 1am: Saturday and Sunday: Staffed: 4.30am to 1.30am
- Station code: PIC
- Website: Transport for NSW

History
- Opened: 1 July 1863

Passengers
- 2025: 65,816 (year); 180 (daily) (Sydney Trains, NSW TrainLink)

Services
| Preceding station | Intercity Trains | Following station |
|---|---|---|
| Tahmoor towards Moss Vale or Goulburn | Southern Highlands Line | Douglas Park towards Campbelltown or Central |
Former service
| Preceding station | Former services | Following station |
|---|---|---|
| Thirlmere towards Mittagong | Picton–Mittagong Loop Line | Terminus |

New South Wales Heritage Register
- Official name: Picton Railway Station group
- Type: State heritage (complex / group)
- Designated: 2 April 1999
- Reference no.: 1224
- Type: Railway Platform / Station
- Category: Transport – Rail
Location

Picton railway station is a heritage-listed railway station located on the Main Southern line in the south-western Sydney suburb of Picton in the Wollondilly Shire local government area of New South Wales, Australia. It was built from 1863 to 1919. It is also known as the Picton Railway Station group. The property was added to the New South Wales State Heritage Register on 2 April 1999. The station opened on 1 July 1869. The station is unusually sited, with southbound journeys actually heading north out of the station before traversing a 225 degree horseshoe curve to again head south, and likewise northbound services heading south before rounding a number of curves to resume their true direction.

== History ==
=== Picton ===
The town of Picton was named by Major Antill after Sir Thomas Picton in 1841. The location was previously known as "Stonequarry". The Duke of Wellington described Picton as a "rough foul-mouthed devil as ever lived" but very capable. He was "respected for his courage and feared for his irascible temperament". He was chiefly remembered for his exploits under Wellington in the Iberian Peninsular War displaying great bravery and persistence. He was killed at the Battle of Waterloo and was the most senior officer to die there. He was buried in the family vault at St. George's, Hanover Square in London. In 1859 Picton was re-interred in St. Paul's Cathedral, London, lying close to the body of the Duke of Wellington.

Following the construction of a new alignment via Bargo in 1919, Picton became a junction station with the original line being retained as a branch line. These trains departed from a dock platform at the southern end of Platform 2. Picton previously had an extensive yard north of the station including locomotive servicing facilities and a turntable. A passing loop ran behind Platform 2 until 2011, when it was removed to allow a lift to be installed.

Picton is a destination for NSW Rail Museum steam trains from Thirlmere, although with the elimination of Picton yard, these now require a locomotive at each end.

== Platforms and services ==
Picton has two side platforms. It is serviced by Sydney Trains Southern Highlands Line services travelling between Campbelltown and Moss Vale with limited morning services to Sydney Central and limited evening services to Goulburn.

| Platform | Line | Stopping pattern | Notes |
| 1 | Southern Highlands Line | services to Campbelltown morning services to Sydney Central (1 weekday, 2 weekend) | |
| 2 | Southern Highlands Line | services to Moss Vale evening services to Goulburn (2 weekday, 1 weekend) | |

== Description ==
The railway station complex managed by the Transport Asset Holding Entity includes a type 3, second class station building, erected in 1863; a footbridge, erected c. 1982; and a two-storey, timber signal box with a hipped roof, erected in 1919.

Other items includes the remains of an engine shed located at 84.8 kilometres (52.7 mi) from Central, at a site managed by the ARTC.

=== Station building (1863) ===
The station building is a simple single-storey Victorian Georgian style building. The building sits on a stone plinth with painted brickwork walls and a symmetrical front elevation with 2 × 6 pane double hung timber framed sash windows.

The building has a linear arrangement with attached parapeted wings at each end containing toilets in one wing and lamp room in the other. The other facilities in the building include a ladies waiting room, telegraph office, booking office and clerks office and baggage office. Access to the platform is through the central booking office.

The building features a hipped slate roof with a major awning to the platform rebuilt at an unknown period and originally supported on columns. The street frontage has a hipped verandah supported on timber posts.

An indication of the individuality of railway station gardens is given by a hanging wall-mounted specimen of stag's horn fern Platycerium superbum) attached to the station building wall at Picton.

=== Footbridge (c. 1982) ===
The station Footbridge was rebuilt in c. 1982 with new steel girders and concrete deck.

=== Signal box (1919) ===
This is a large signal box located on the platform and was constructed in 1919. It is a timber structure with windows on three sides of the upper level. Access is from the platform via an external stair with WC on the landing. The roof is hipped, clad in corrugated iron overhanging on all sides to shade the upper windows. This is one of a small number of similar boxes remaining in the state.

== Transport links ==
Picton Buslines operate six routes to and from Picton station:

- 900 to Campbelltown station
- 901 to Wilton and Douglas Park
- 911 to Buxton and Bargo
- 912 to Bargo and Yanderra
- 913 to Buxton and Thirlmere
- 914 to Buxton and Thirlmere
- 915 to Nangarin Vineyard Estate via Barkers Lodge Road

Berrima Buslines operate one route via Picton station for NSW TrainLink:

- 828 Loopline Bus to Bowral station

== Heritage listing ==
As at 30 November 2010, Picton Railway Precinct is of state significance as one of the earliest surviving railway locations in NSW, opening in 1863 only eight years after the first line from Sydney to Parramatta in 1855. Picton Railway Precinct is significant as the terminus of the Southern line until 1867 prior to the extension of the Great Southern Line through to Mittagong, Goulburn and on to Albury. The construction of the line to Picton is significant for its association with John Whitton, Engineer-in-Chief of the NSWGR, and was one of his early achievements during his long career. The design of the Picton station building is also attributed to Whitton and is a fine example of a simple Victorian Georgian style station building that remains substantially intact. The signal box built in 1919 is a good example of an elevated timber signal box, representative of other similar structures in the network.

Picton railway station was listed on the New South Wales State Heritage Register on 2 April 1999 having satisfied the following criteria.

The place possesses uncommon, rare or endangered aspects of the cultural or natural history of New South Wales.

This item is assessed as historically rare. This item is assessed as scientifically rare. This item is assessed as arch. rare. This item is assessed as socially rare.

== See also ==
- List of railway stations in New South Wales
