= Yanderra =

- Suburb
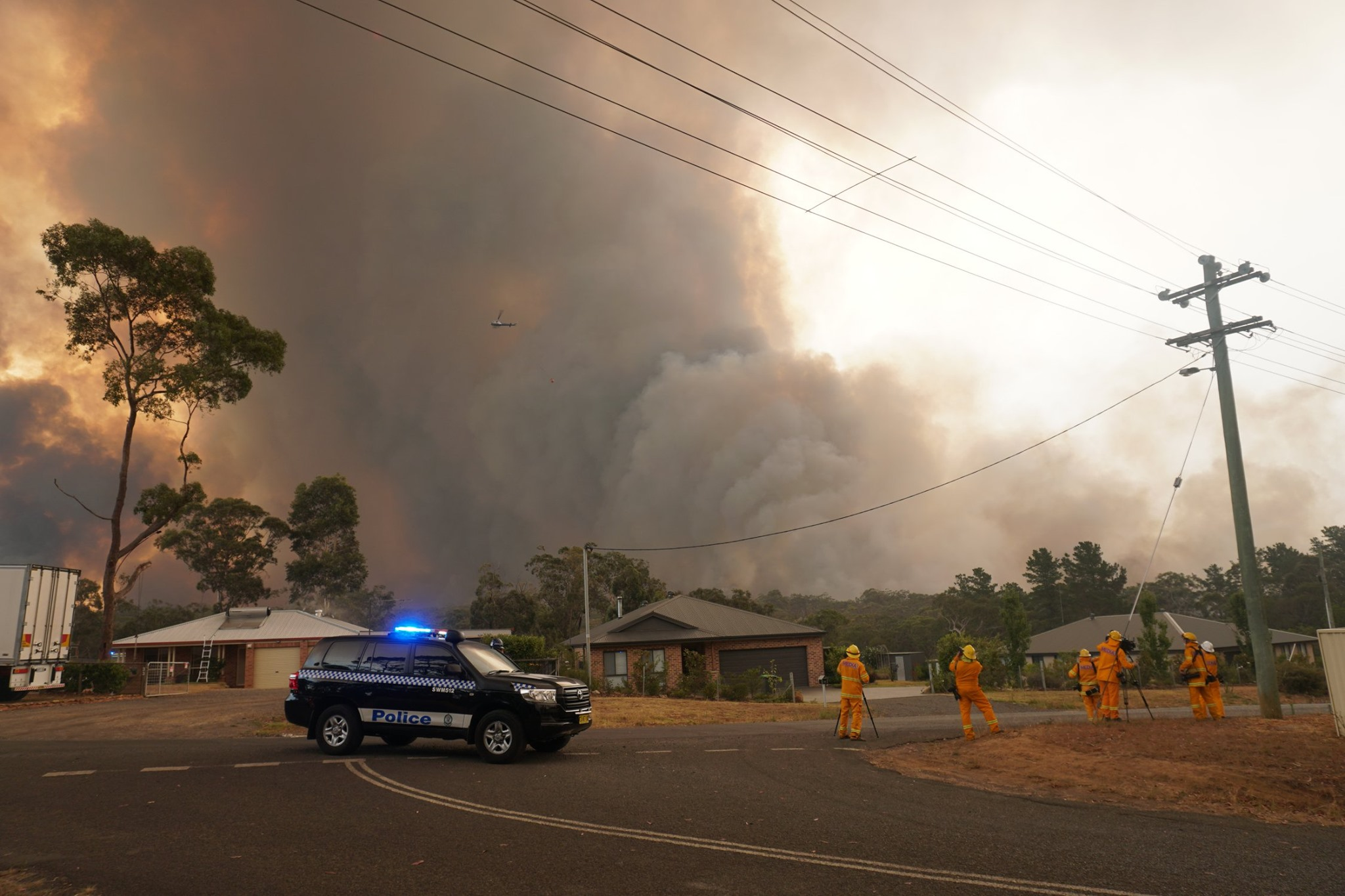
- Bushfire moving towards Yanderra in December 2019

- Coordinates: 34°19′S 150°34′E
- Country: Australia
- State: New South Wales
- City: Sydney
- LGA: Wollondilly Shire
- Location: 93 km (58 mi) SW of Sydney CBD; 20 km (12 mi) NE of Mittagong

Government
  - State electorate: Wollondilly
  - Federal division: Hume
- Elevation: 414 m (1,358 ft)

Population
  - Total: 702 (SAL 2021)
- Postcode: 2574
Suburbs around Yanderra
	Bargo
Balmoral	Yanderra
	Yerrinbool

Yanderra is a small suburb and locality that is located in the Macarthur Region of Sydney in New South Wales, Australia. Yanderra is geographically the southernmost point of the Greater Sydney area that is located on the Hume Highway. The suburb is part of the Wollondilly Shire local government area and is located 93 kilometres (58 mi) southwest of the Sydney CBD.

== Geography ==
Yanderra is part of Wollondilly located between Bargo and Southern Highlands' Yerrinbool, and is located next to the Hume Highway. It is an area within the area of Wollondilly, New South Wales, and is located 78 km from the Sydney CBD extending over an area of 2.743 square kilometres. The area is often affected by earthquakes.

== Population ==
At the 2021 census, Yanderra had a population of 702. The name Yanderra comes from an Aboriginal word for turpentine tree. The Yanderra is home to the Rural Fire Brigade in the jurisdiction of the township of Yanderra.

== Transport ==
Yanderra railway station on the Main South railway line served the village between 1924 and 1975. It is mostly known for the murder of three railway workers in a deliberate explosion, during an attempted robbery near the station. The station itself has now been demolished and no trace remains.
