= Old Hume Highway =

Road in Australia

Old Hume Highway: Camden Valley Way; Remembrance Drive; Yass Valley Way; Goulburn Valley Highway; Sydney Road; New South Wales–Victoria
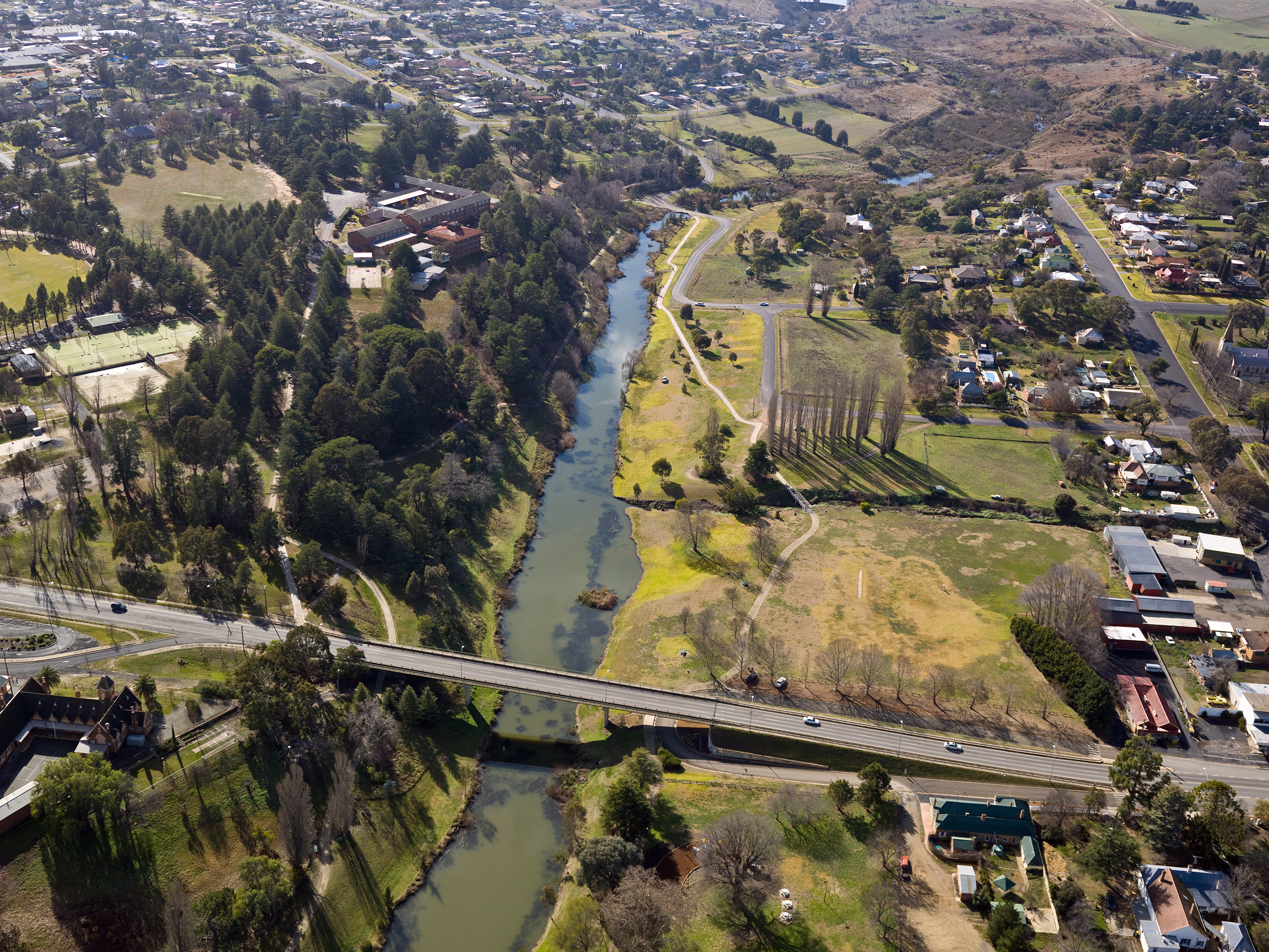
- A section of the Old Hume Highway, now known as the Yass Valley Way, across the Yass River, New South Wales
- Coordinates: 33°56′34″S 150°52′16″E (NE end); 37°40′23″S 144°57′25″E (SW end)

General information
- Type: Road
- Opened: November 1842

Major junctions
- NE end: Hume Motorway (M31); Hume Highway (A28); Prestons, New South Wales
- SW end: Hume Freeway (M31); Campbellfield, Victoria

Location(s)
- Major suburbs: Camden, Campbelltown, Mittagong, Berrima, Goulburn, Yass, Gundagai, Albury, Wodonga, Wangaratta, Benalla, Euroa, Broadford, Craigieburn, Campbellfield

Highway system
- Highways in Australia; National Highway • Freeways in Australia; Highways in New South Wales; Highways in Victoria

The Old Hume Highway, an urban and rural road, may be described as any part of an earlier route of the Hume Highway, which traverses Victoria and New South Wales between the cities of Sydney and Melbourne in Australia. In some places, the highway has been deviated several times since the first rough track was made between Sydney and Melbourne in November 1842.

== History ==
Since the time of the first track, the route of what is now the Hume Highway has been the main road link between the Australia's two largest cities – Sydney and Melbourne. Since February 1960 a freeway standard of road has been developed along this route. Where the alignment of the original road is reasonably flat and straight it has been duplicated and retained for traffic in one direction. In some locations the original road has been replaced by a dual carriageway road right beside the original road. In other locations the new road deviates from the original by many kilometres.

In both Victoria and New South Wales since 2013, 100% of the Hume Highway has been upgraded to at least dual carriageway standard and is called the Hume Freeway. In both metropolitan Sydney and Melbourne, the road reverts to the Hume Highway and takes on the conditions of an urban highway.

Many of the superseded sections of the Hume Highway are of historical interest as they provide insights into the small historical towns which have since been bypassed. In the past when the highway passed through these towns, many were thriving centres. Many of the superseded sections of the highway still form the main access roads into and through these towns. One section of the Old Hume Highway, called the Yass Valley Way, travels through Yass in southern New South Wales.

=== Razorback Blockade ===
On 2nd April 1979 5 truck drivers met at Razorback Mountain Pass and blocked the Hume Highway in protest against road taxes and other issues that were crippling the instate truck drivers. Razorback Mountain pass is section of Hume north of Picton, New South Wales. This site was the focal point of the protests in NSW though other blockades taking place in NSW as were blockades in Victoria, South Australia, and Queensland.

Queensland, South Australian, and Victorian governments negotiated in good faith and resolve their blockades. In NSW the blockade until Wednesday 11th. The drivers voted to accept a compromised set of conditions, though no trucks would move until the NSW Premier Neville Wran made a written statement announcing an agreement which had been a key sticking point to negotiations there. Just after lunch news reached Razorback Mountain that the Premier had announced on the John Laws program the agreement.

== Major deviations ==
The section of the Hume Highway between the Cross Roads, at Prestons on Sydney's southwestern fringe, and the Medway Rivulet near Berrima, was completely superseded in the period 1973–1992 by a new route built as a freeway.

Most of the highway route between Breadalbane, west of Goulburn, and Derringullen Creek, west of Yass, was replaced during 1994. This included a bypassing of the Cullerin Range. The previous route of the highway over the Cullerin Range was itself a deviation built in 1920, using sections of railway formation abandoned several years earlier when the Main Southern railway line was deviated at the time it was duplicated. The deviations were an attempt to ease the gradients against heavily laden Sydney-bound steam trains.

The Breadalbane–Derringullen Creek deviation is in most places quite close to the previous highway, most of which remains for local use. This section also included the abandoning of the route over the Mundoonen Range which, when it was rebuilt in the 1960s, was designed to be duplicated.

Between Conroys Gap and Coolac, most of the earlier alignment was replaced in 1983 and 1996 by realignment associated with dual carriageway construction, although sections such as that south of Connors Creek were rebuilt in 1979 with the earthworks being done for a second carriageway, which was subsequently built in 1994.

The current route of the highway between Tumblong and Tarcutta is the third route of the highway in this location. The original route led west from Tumblong along the Murrumbidgee River, before turning south over difficult country, crossing what is now the Sturt Highway and rejoining the current route of the highway as Lower Tarcutta Road. This was replaced in December 1938 by the first Tumblong deviation, to the east of the current route. The main features of this section of the highway were a deep, narrow cutting and the reinforced concrete bowstring arch bridge over Hillas Creek. This has been preserved, and is visible on the western side of the highway close to the interchange with the Snowy Mountains Highway.

North of Albury, a major deviation of the highway was constructed in the 1930s due to the inundation of the original route caused by the raising of the wall of the Hume Dam on the Murray River. The deviation commences at Bowna and terminates at Guinea Street, Albury (the first part of the Riverina Highway east from Albury as far as what is now Old Sydney Road was until then the Hume Highway). On the southern side at Bowna Waters the old route terminates at dead end. On the northern side the old route is now a road that services local farms, including Willow Park, with the remainder of the old route now being part of private property and inaccessible to road traffic. Parts of the old route are visible when the waters of Lake Hume are low from the air and satellite imagery (Google Map)

== Major sections, which have now been bypassed ==
=== New South Wales ===
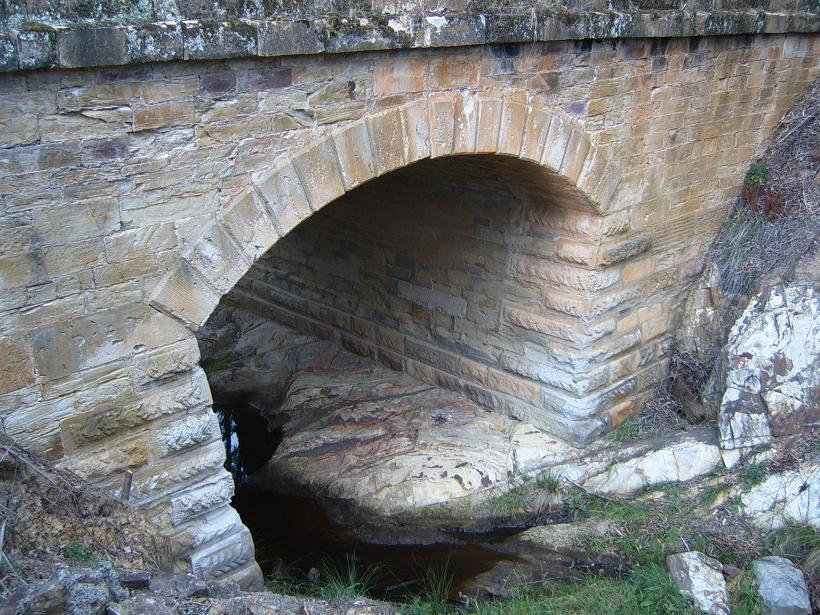
Towrang bridge of 1839, at Derrick VC rest stop 10 kilometres (6.2 mi) north of Goulburn.

- Camden Valley Way (formerly)
  28-kilometre (17 mi) stretch between the Cross Roads, south of Liverpool and Camden
- Remembrance Drive (Old Hume Highway) (formerly)
  70-kilometre (43 mi) stretch between Camden and Aylmerton and between Aylmerton and the Medway Rivulet (part of), near Berrima
- Old Hume Highway
  10-kilometre (6.2 mi) stretch through Goulburn
- Cullerin Road
  23-kilometre (14 mi) stretch between Breadalbane and the foot of the Mundoonen Range, including through Gunning
- Yass Valley Way
  17-kilometre (11 mi) stretch through Yass and intersecting with the Barton Highway
- The section of road bypassed by the Tumblong deviation, between Tumblong and Hillas Creeks
- Former 15km Hume Highway route through Albury.

=== Victoria ===
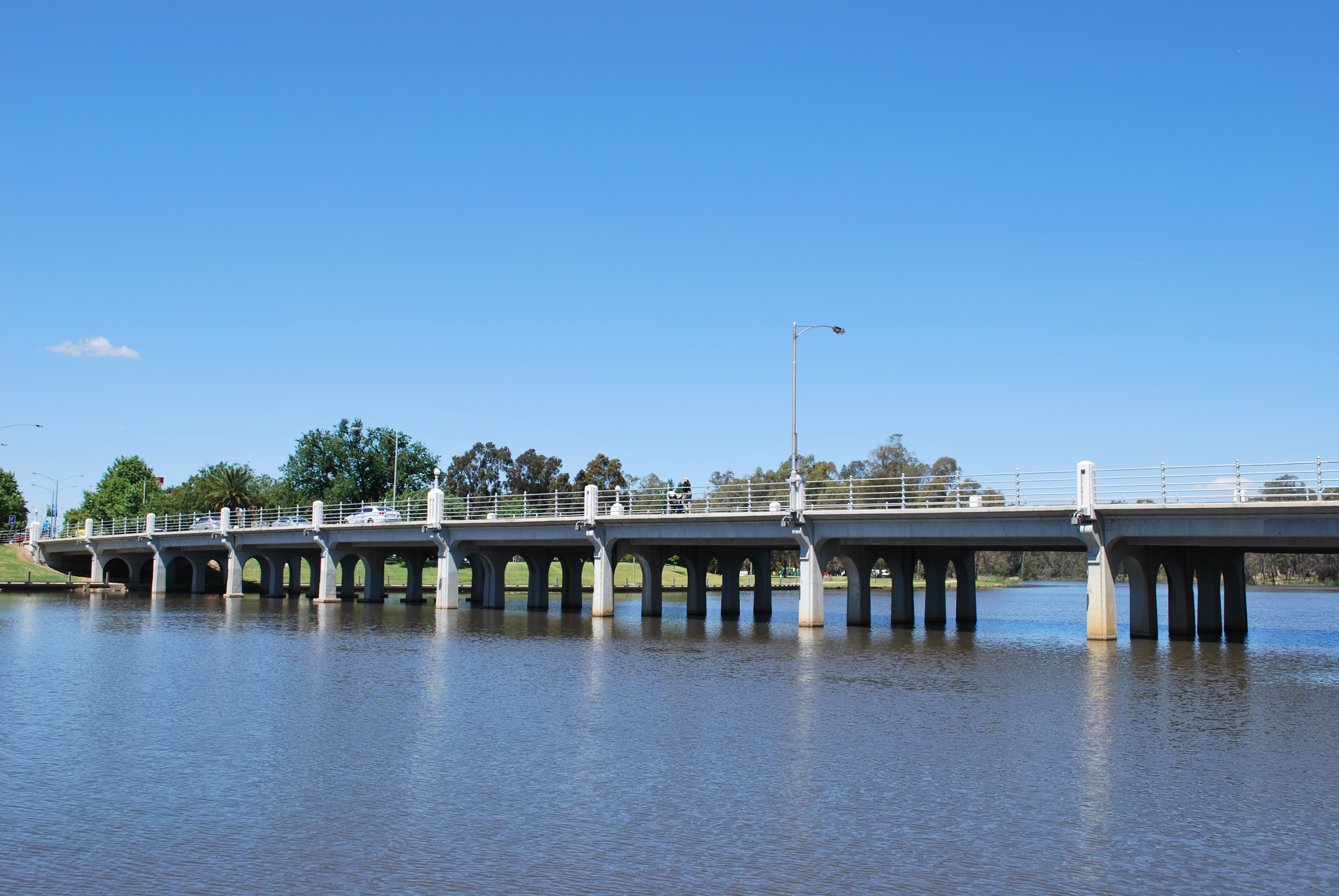
The Benalla–Monash Bridge at Benalla, Victoria, part of the former Hume Highway alignment

- Hume Highway & Melbourne Road
  4-kilometre (2.5 mi) stretch through Wodonga
- Wangaratta Road, Old Hume Highway, Winton–Glenrowan Road, Benalla–Winton Road & Baddaginnie–Benalla Road
  6-kilometre (3.7 mi) stretch between Bowser and Baddaginne. This stretch runs through Wangaratta, Glenrowan & Benalla
- Euroa Main Road
  6-kilometre (3.7 mi) stretch through Euroa
- Seymour–Tooborac Road, Goulburn Valley Highway and Seymour–Avenel Road
  23-kilometre (14 mi) stretch between Avenel and Seymour
- Northern Highway and Kilmore–Broadford Road
  37-kilometre (23 mi) stretch between Broadford and Wallan
- Sydney Road
  11-kilometre (6.8 mi) stretch between Craigieburn and Campbellfield

== See also ==
- Highways in New South Wales
- Highways in Victoria
- Highways in Australia
