= Thirlmere railway station =

Former railway station in New South Wales, Australia

Thirlmere
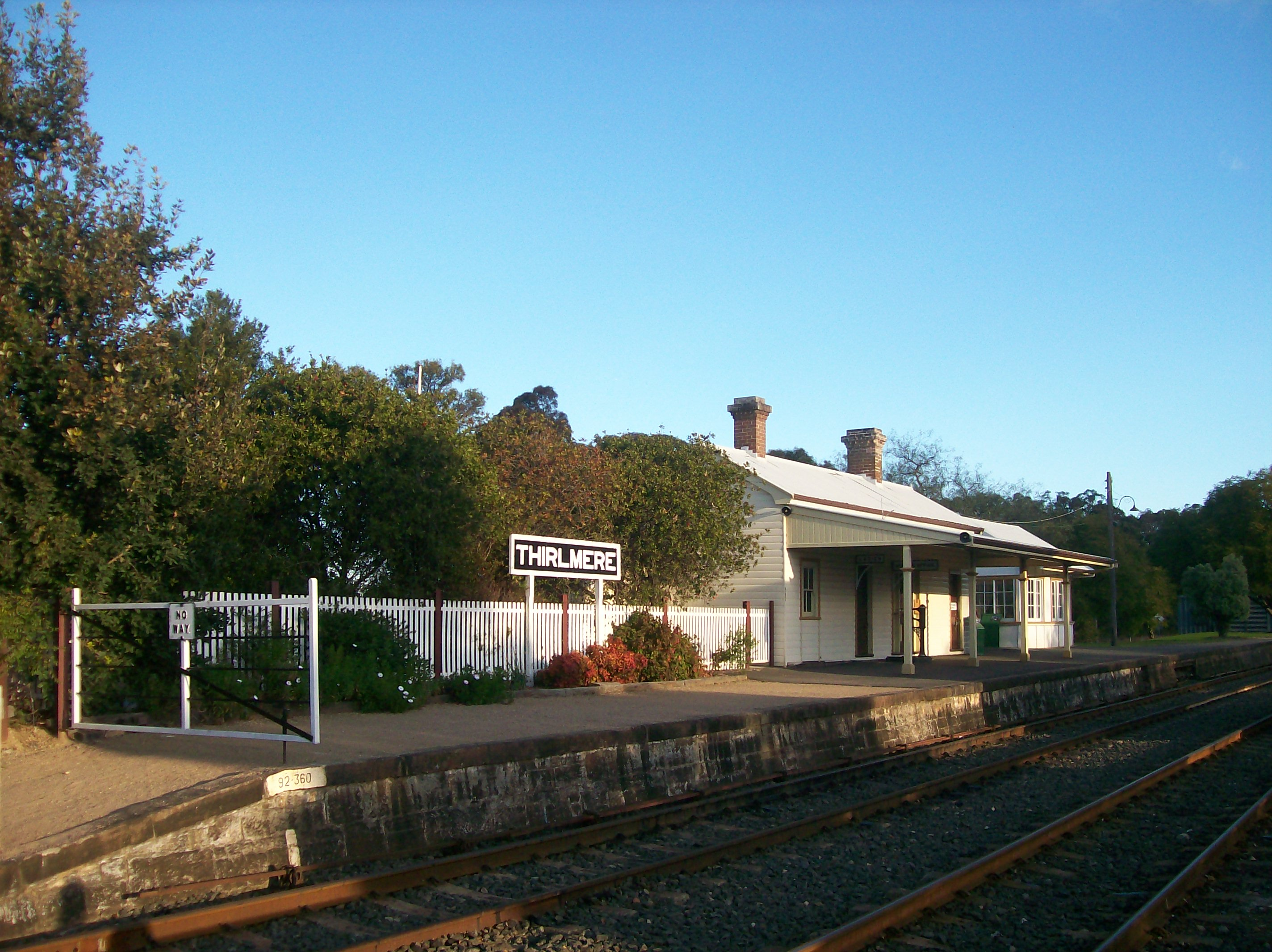

General information
- Location: 10 Barbour Road, Thirlmere, New South Wales; Australia
- Coordinates: 34°12′16″S 150°34′19″E
- Operator: NSW Rail Museum
- Lines: Picton–Mittagong loop line Main Southern line
- Platforms: 1 (1 side)
- Tracks: 2

Construction
- Structure type: Ground

Other information
- Status: Closed and reused

History
- Opened: 1 August 1885
- Closed: 1978
- Former names: Redbank (1885–1886)

Services
Preceding station	Former services	Following station
Couridjah towards Mittagong	Picton–Mittagong Loop Line	Picton Terminus
Location

Thirlmere railway station is a heritage railway station located on the Picton–Mittagong loop railway line, serving the town of Thirlmere in the Macarthur Region, New South Wales, Australia.

== History ==
The station opened on 1 August 1885 as Redbank and was renamed Thirlmere on 1 August 1886. The station, along with the line, was closed to passenger services in 1978.

The station buildings have been restored by volunteers from the NSW Rail Museum in Thirlmere.

Every weekend the NSW Rail Museum operates four return heritage steam or diesel train services between Thirlmere and Buxton with special events operating heritage services between Central, Picton, Thirlmere, and Buxton.

== Image gallery ==
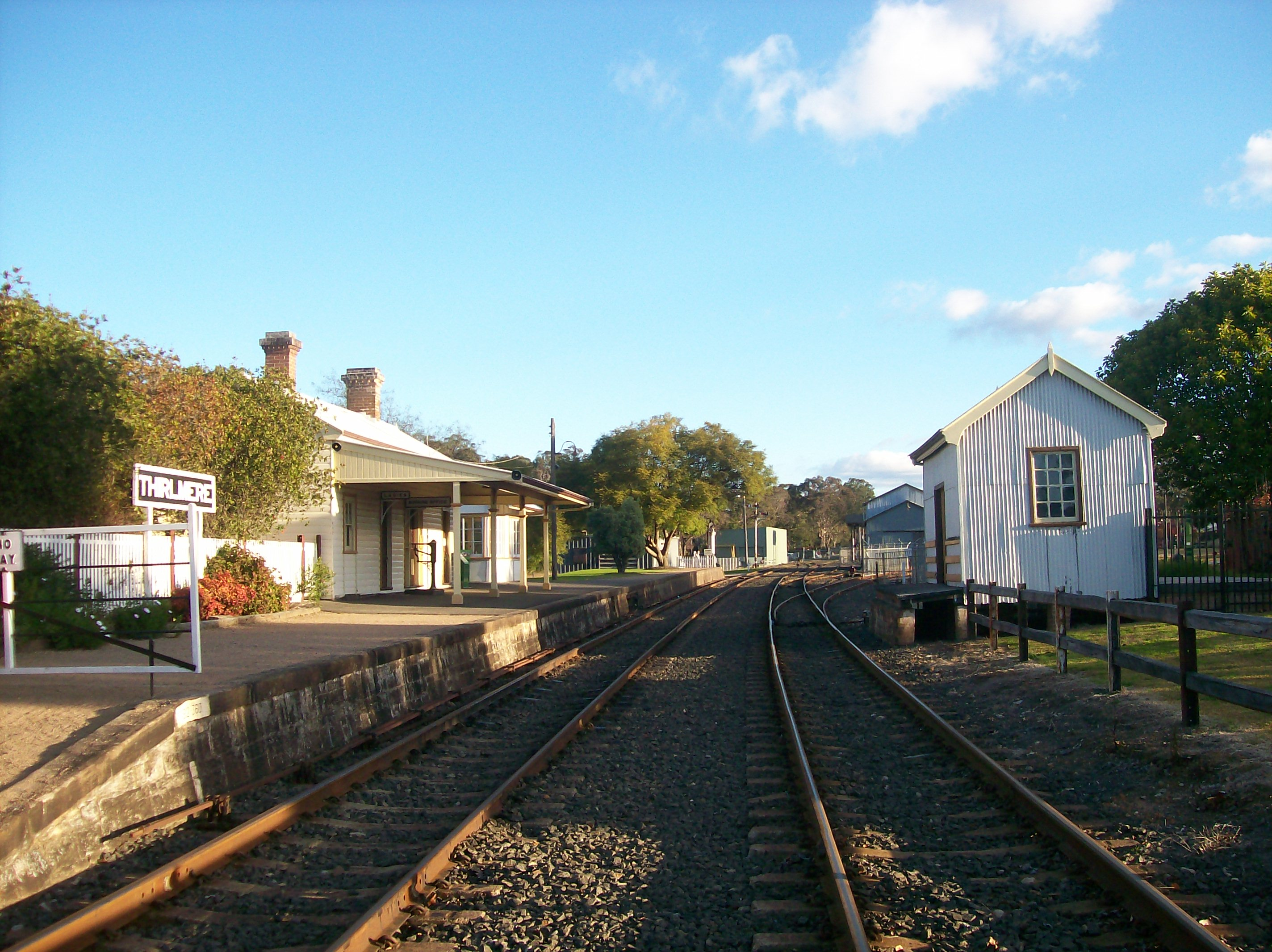
View of station from railway crossing

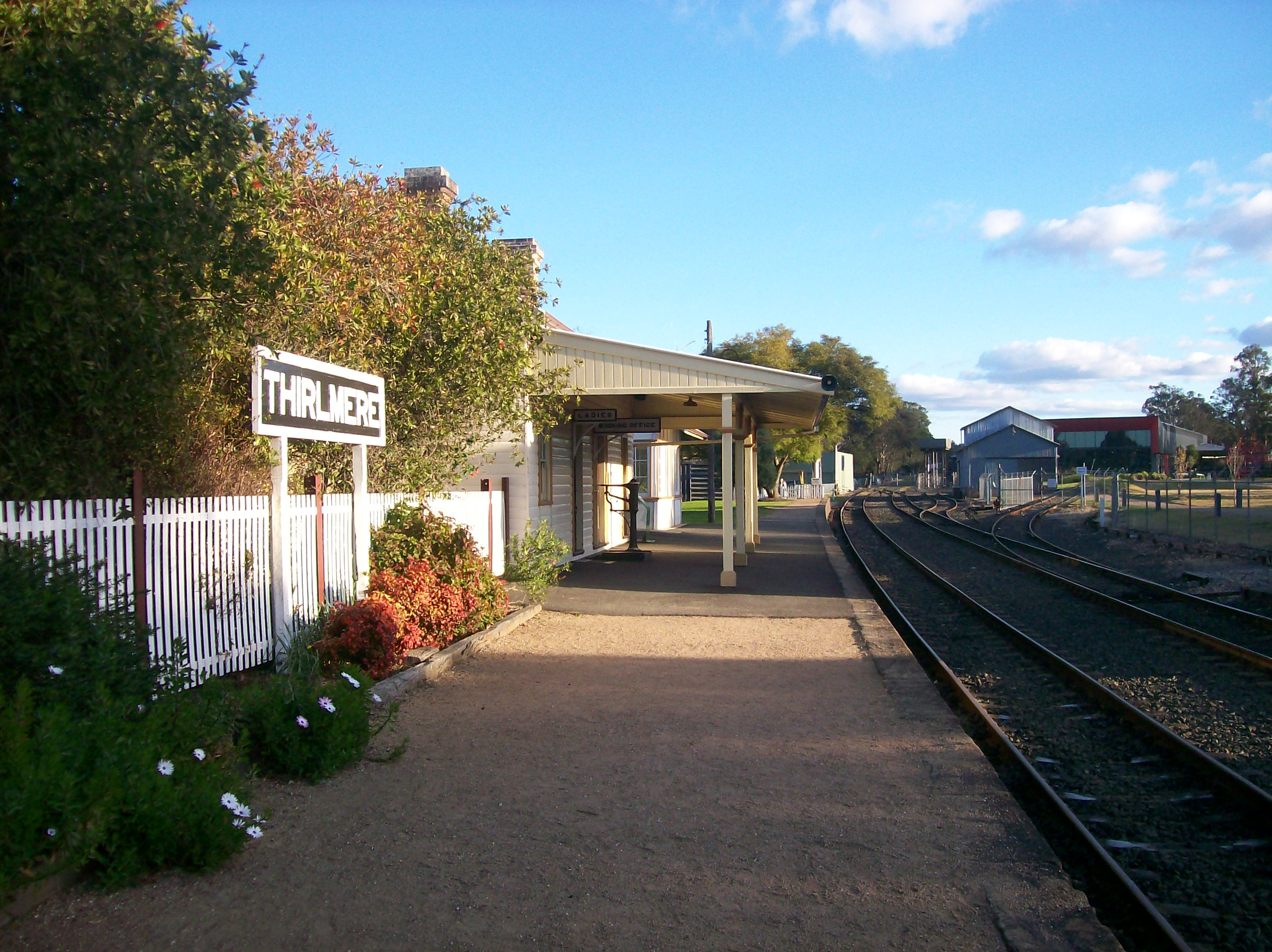
Platform looking south

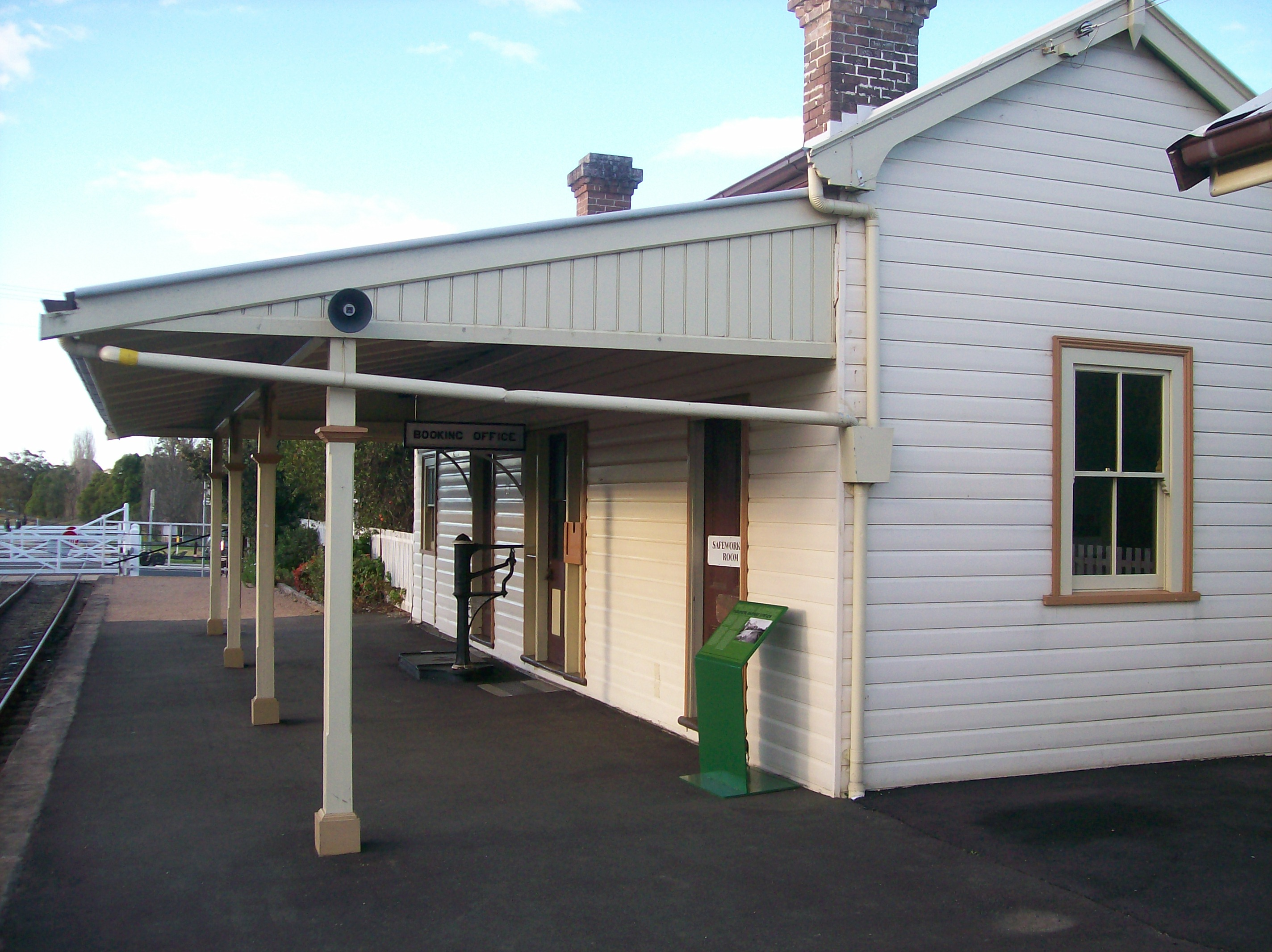
Station building

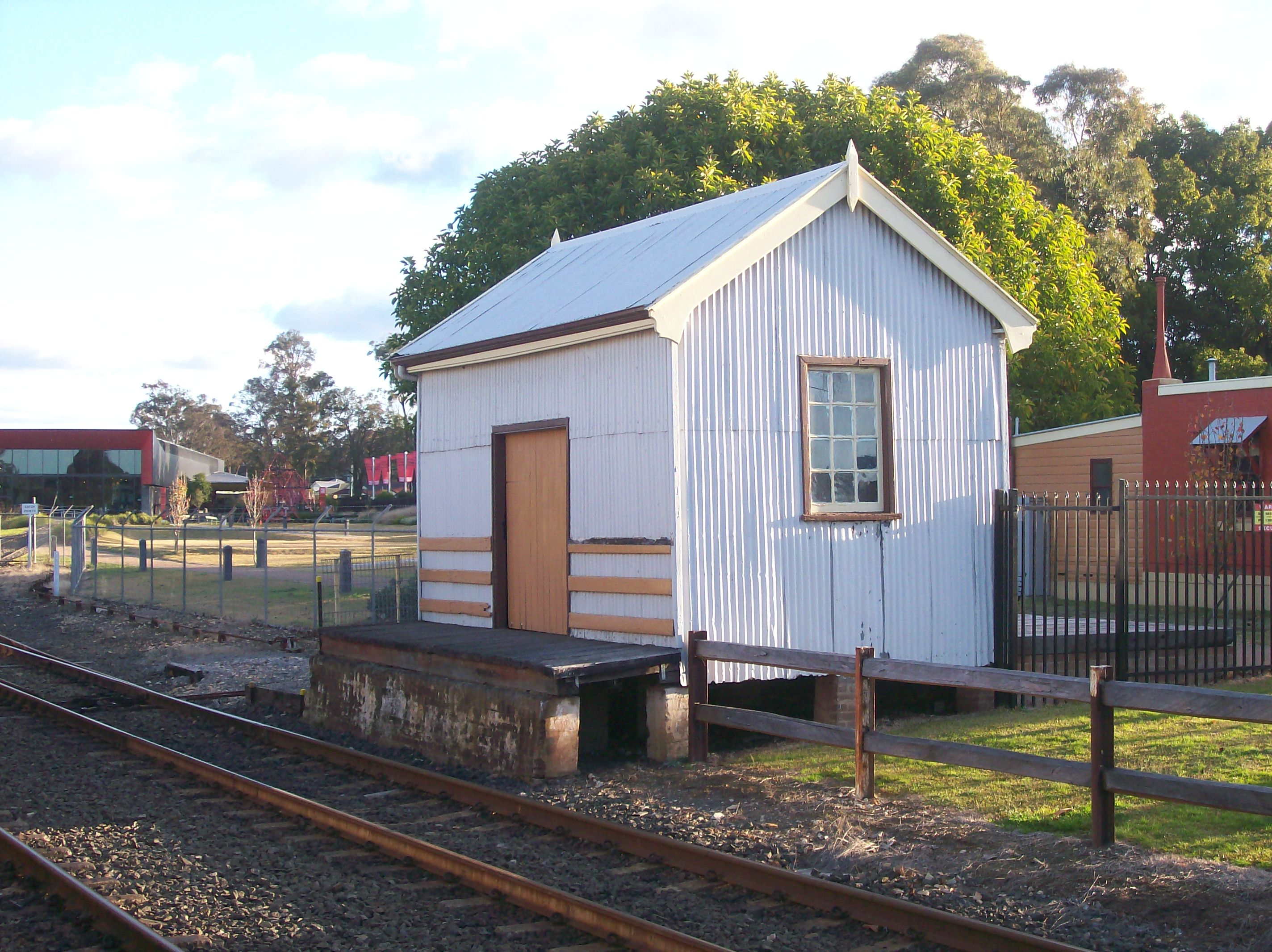
Opposite platform

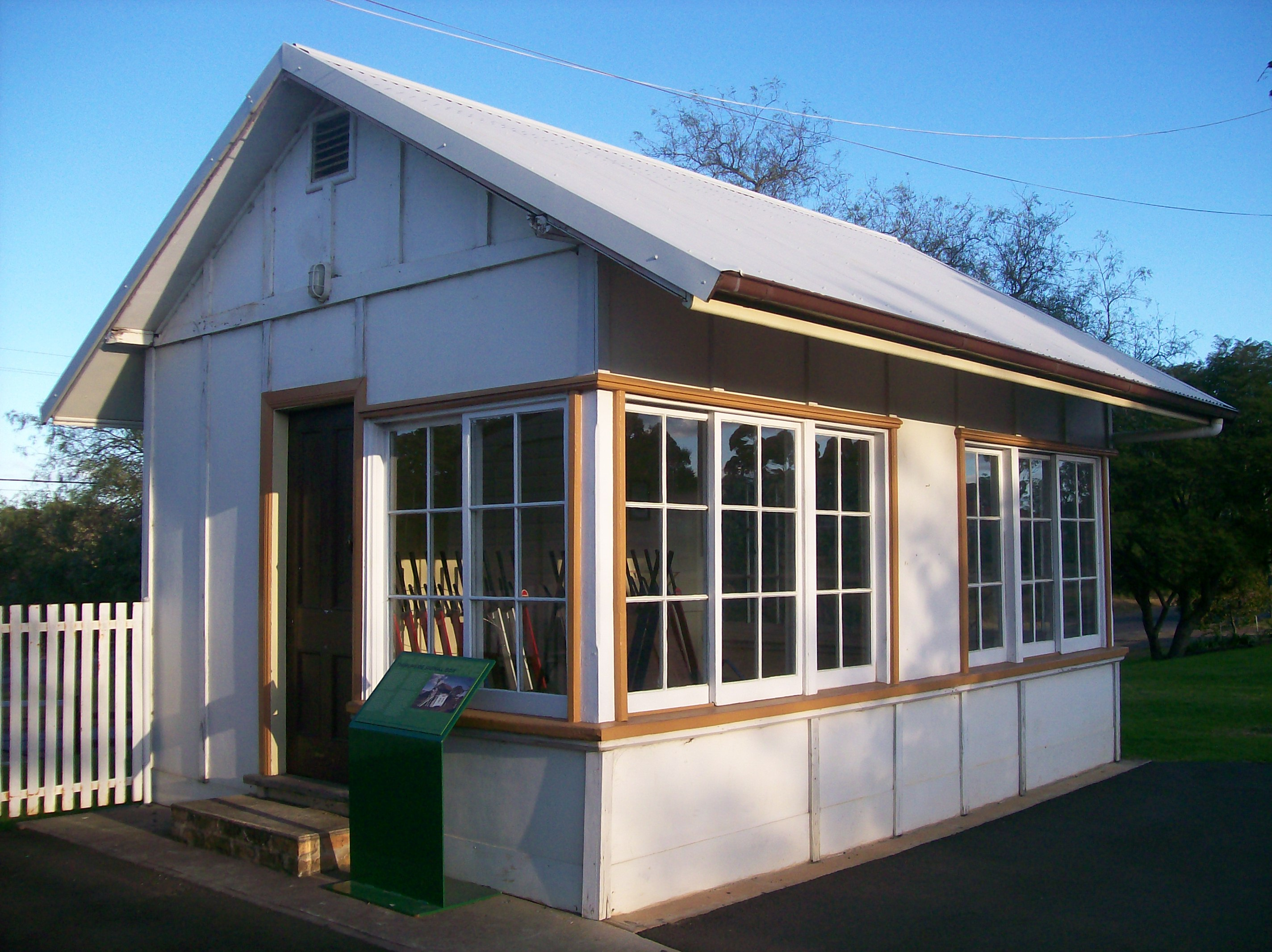
Signal box

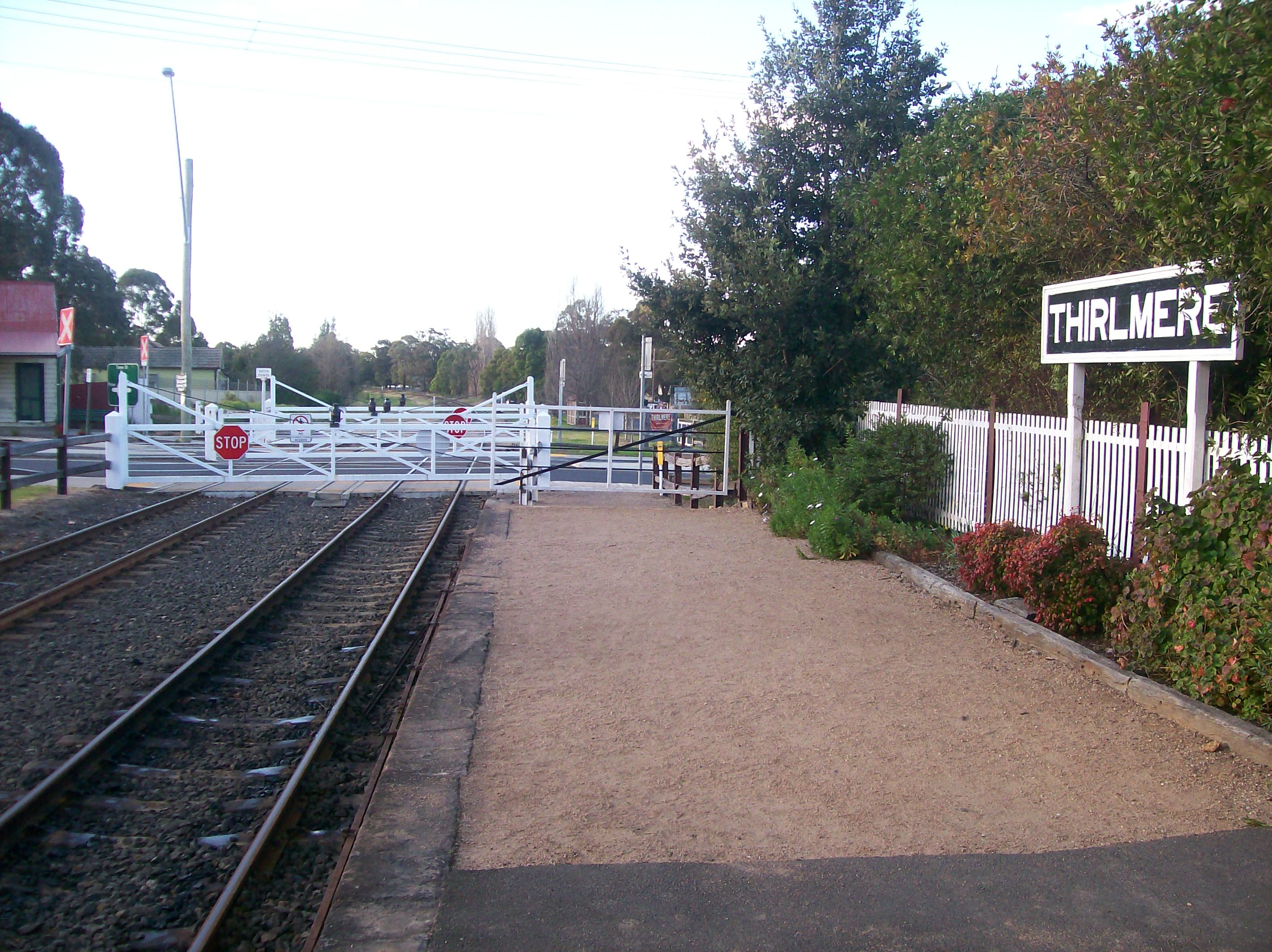
View of railway crossing from platform

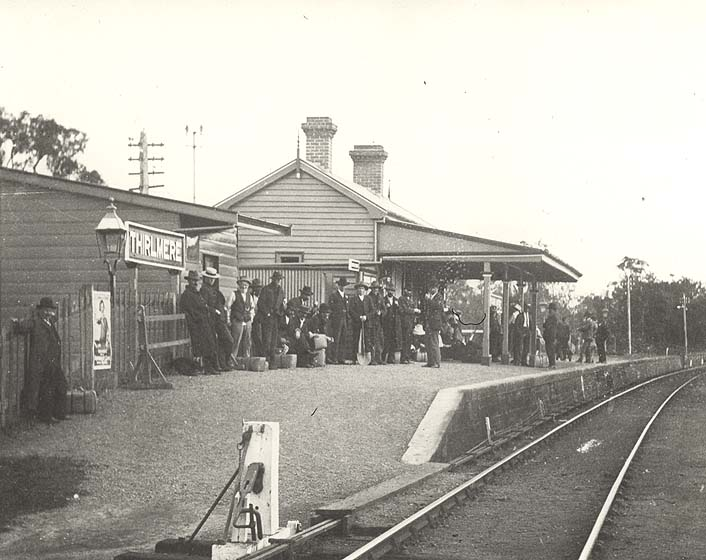
The station c.1900

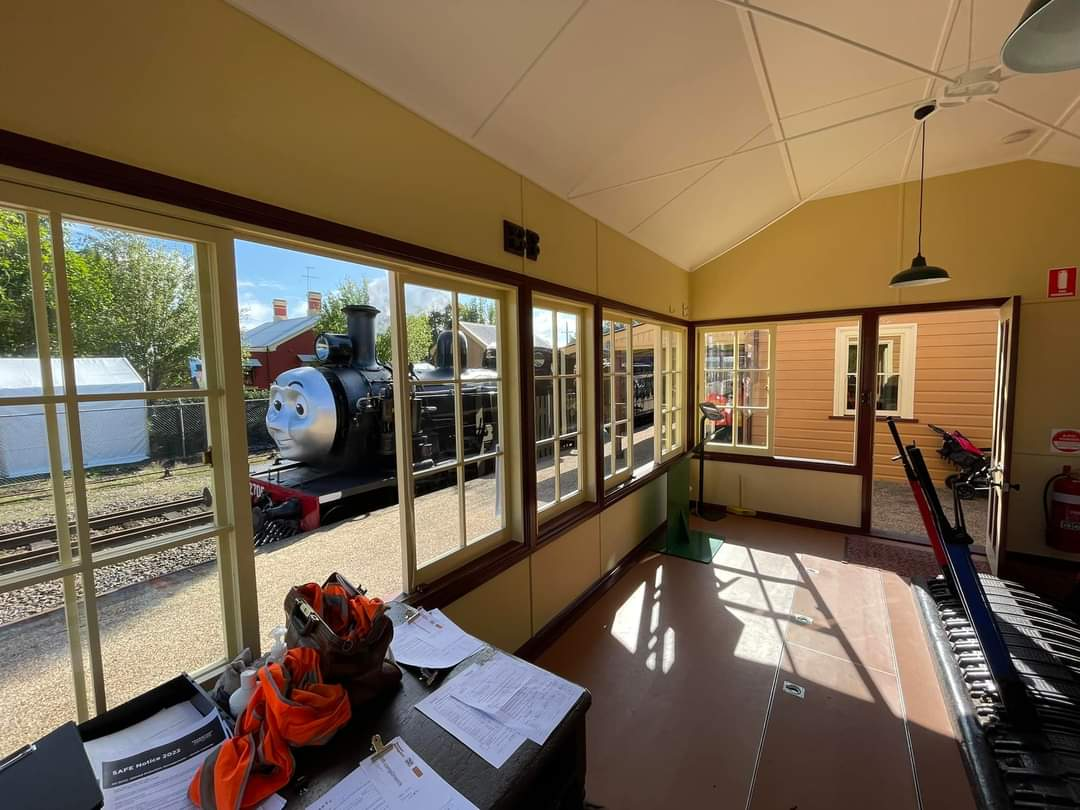
Inside Thrilmere signal box

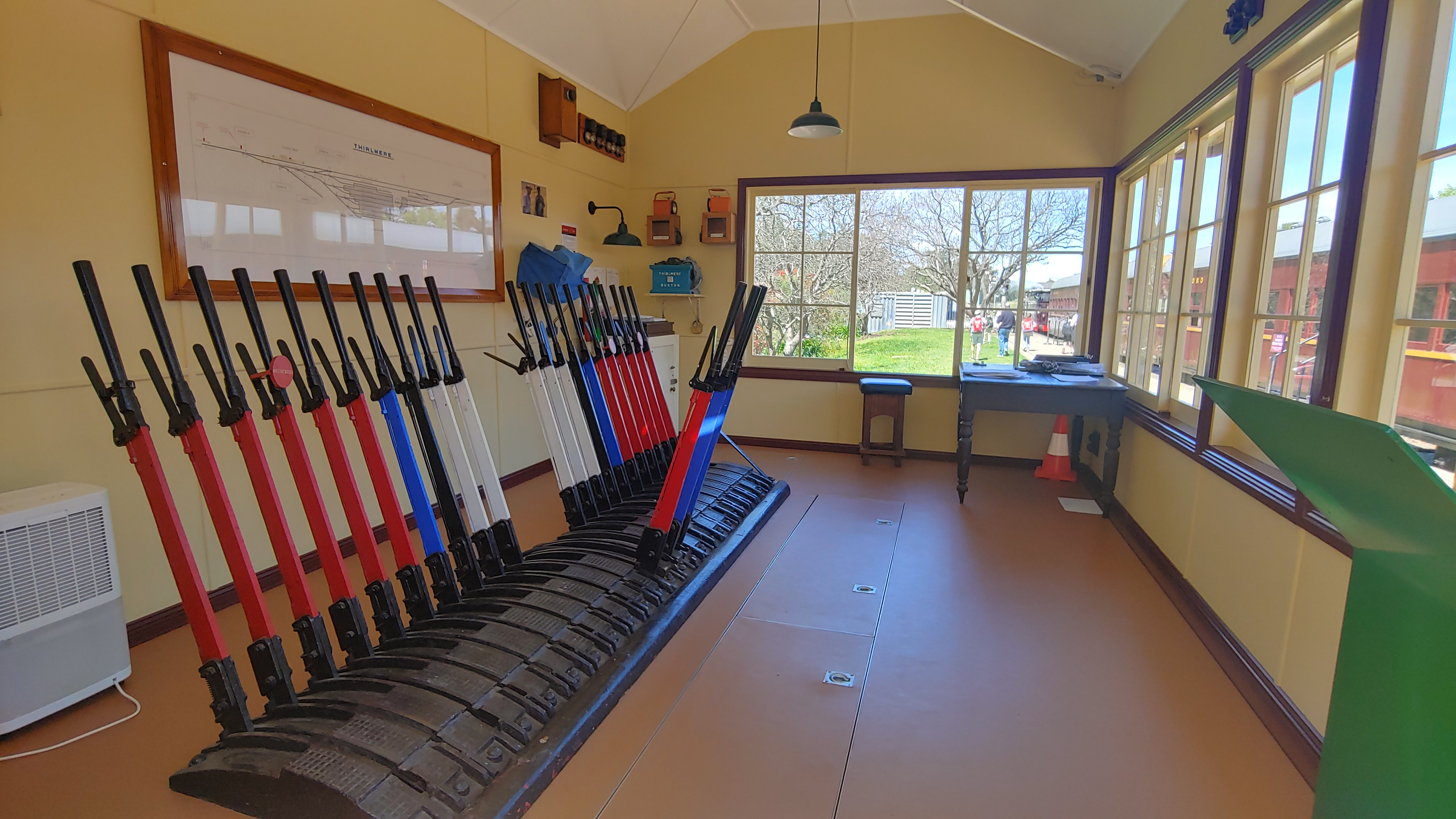
Inside Thirlmere signal box
