= Couridjah railway station =

Former railway station in New South Wales, Australia

Couridjah
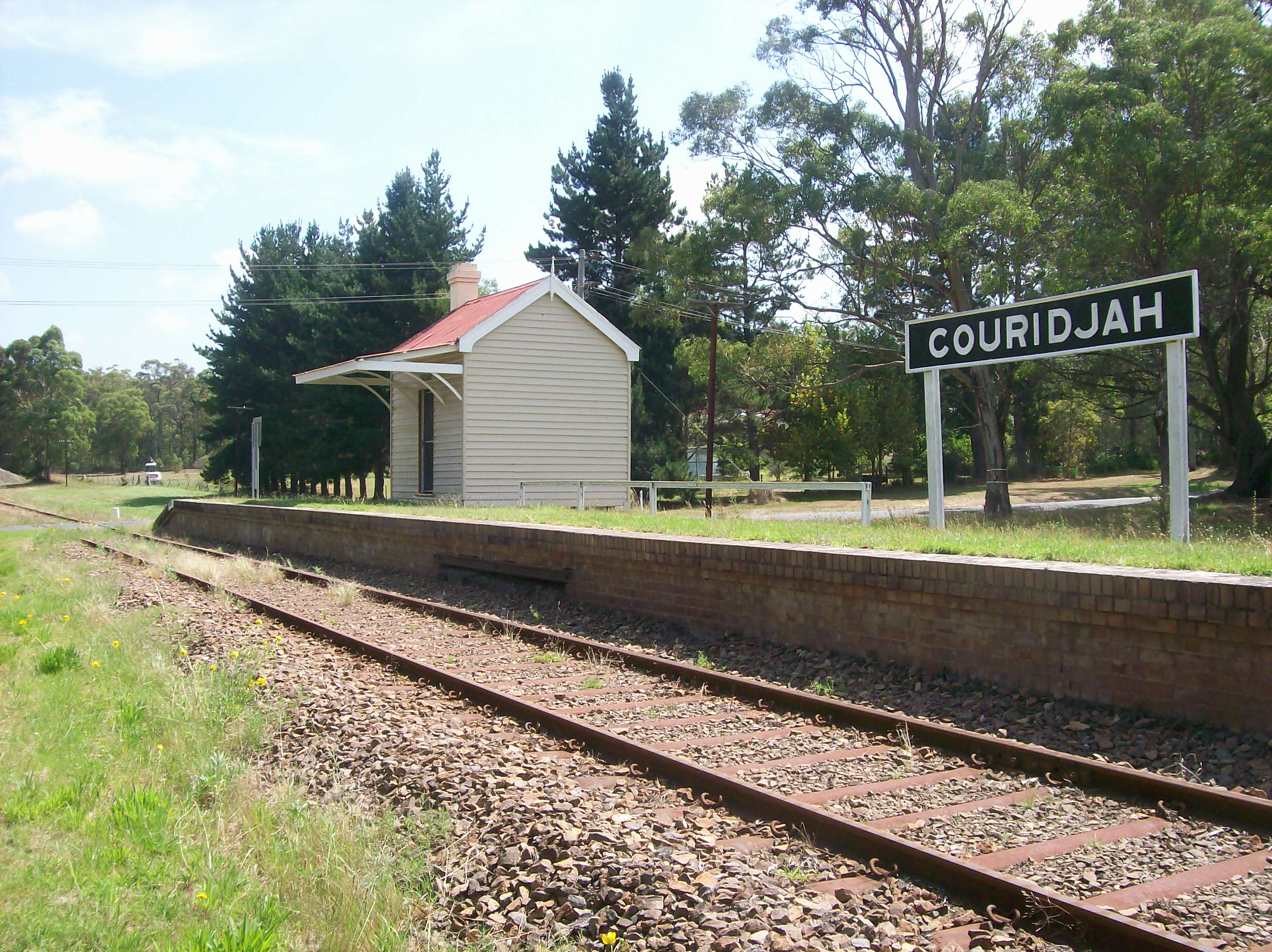

General information
- Location: Couridjah, New South Wales; Australia
- Coordinates: 34.2329°S 150.5496°E
- Owner: Transport Asset Manager of New South Wales
- Operator: NSW Rail Museum
- Lines: Picton–Mittagong line Main Southern line
- Platforms: 1 (1 side)
- Tracks: 1

Construction
- Structure type: Ground

Other information
- Status: Closed and reused

History
- Opened: 2 December 1867
- Closed: 1978
- Former names: Picton Lagoons Tank (1867–1878); Lagoons (1878–1879); Picton Lakes' (1879–1929)

Services
Preceding station	Former services	Following station
Buxton towards Mittagong	Picton–Mittagong Loop Line	Thirlmere towards Picton

New South Wales Heritage Register
- Official name: Couridjah Railway Station
- Type: State heritage (built)
- Designated: 2 April 1999
- Reference no.: 1121
- Type: Railway Platform/ Station
- Category: Transport - Rail
Location

Couridjah railway station is a heritage-listed disused railway station located on the Picton–Mittagong loop railway line in the south-western Sydney settlement of Couridjah in the Wollondilly Shire local government area of New South Wales, Australia. The property was added to the New South Wales State Heritage Register on 2 April 1999.

== History ==
The station opened on 2 December 1867 as Picton Lagoons Tank, was renamed Lagoons in 1878, Picton Lakes on 21 April 1879 and finally Couridjah on 1 January 1929. The station along with the rest of the line was closed to passenger services in 1978.

The station has been restored by volunteers from the NSW Rail Museum in Thirlmere. Occasionally, the museum operates steam heritage trains on the line through the station, between Thirlmere, Picton and Buxton.

== Description ==
The complex comprises a type 9 timber waiting shed non-standard bracketed building that is used the railway station building, erected in 1867; a platform face and platform surface.

== Heritage listing ==
Couridjah station building is a rare non-standard timber building from early in the development of the railway (1867), there being one other similar building at Raglan, and is of high significance, even though a modest building.

Couridjah railway station was listed on the New South Wales State Heritage Register on 2 April 1999 having satisfied the following criteria.

The place possesses uncommon, rare or endangered aspects of the cultural or natural history of New South Wales.

This item is assessed as historically and socially rare. This item is assessed as arch. rare.

== See also ==
- List of disused railway stations in New South Wales
