= Buxton railway station (disambiguation) =

Buxton railway station is a station in Buxton, Derbyshire.

Buxton railway station may also refer to:

- Buxton railway station (Midland Railway), a former station in Buxton, Derbyshire.
- Buxton railway station (Norfolk), on the Bure Valley Railway.
- Buxton railway station, New South Wales, heritage railway station.
