= Buxton, New South Wales =

Coordinates: 34.254423°S 150.533885°E

Buxton
- Town
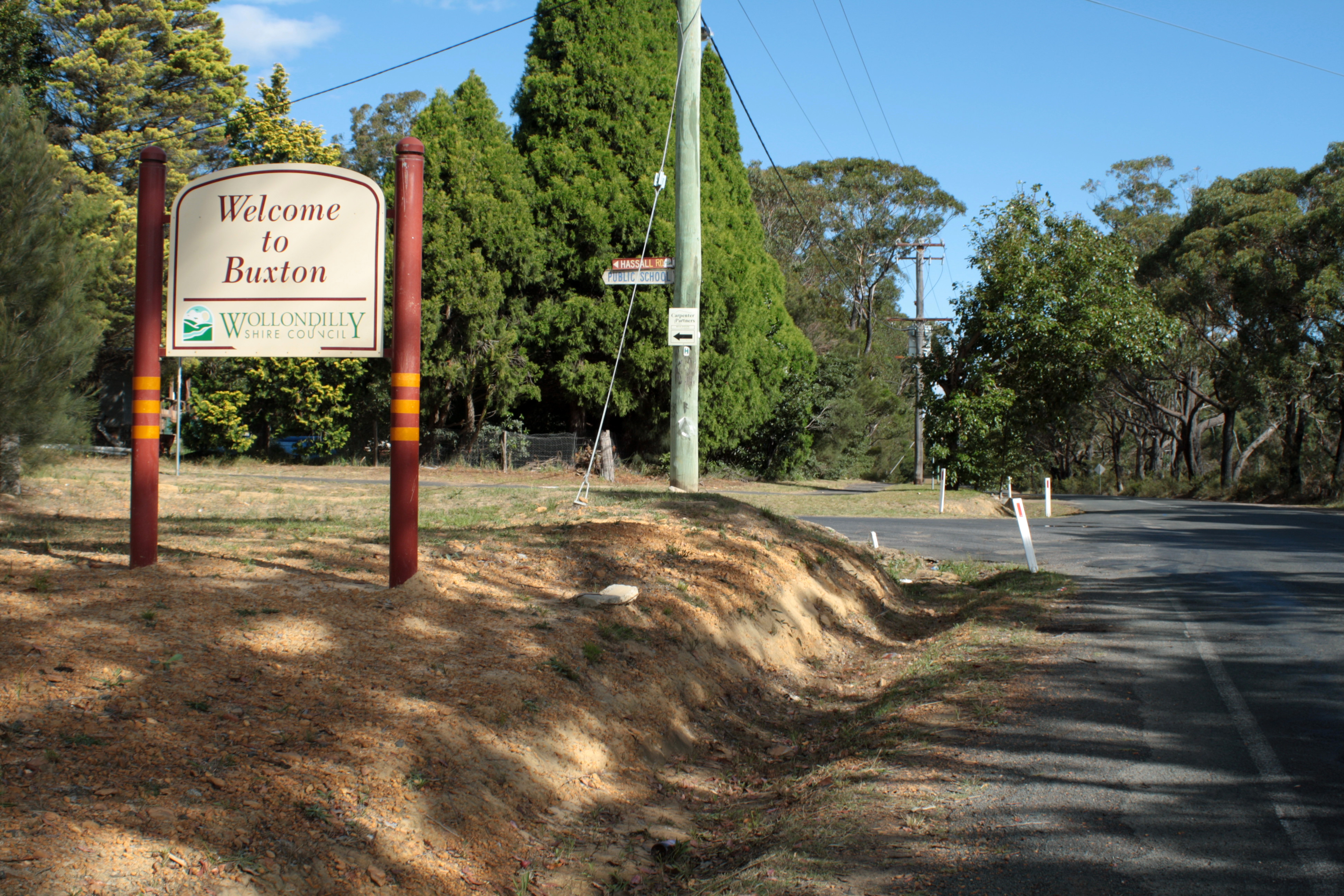
- East Parade, Buxton, looking south
- Country: Australia
- State: New South Wales
- Region: Macarthur
- LGA: Wollondilly Shire
- Location: 107 km (66 mi) SW of Sydney CBD; 27 km (17 mi) N of Mittagong

Government
  - State electorate: Wollondilly
  - Federal division: Hume
- Elevation: 396 m (1,299 ft)

Population
  - Total: 2,071 (2021 census)
- Postcode: 2571
Localities around Buxton
Thirlmere		Couridjah
Thirlmere Lakes National Park	Buxton
	Balmoral

Buxton is a small village in the Macarthur Region of Sydney in New South Wales, Australia, in Wollondilly Shire. At the 2021 census, Buxton had a population of 2,071 people. Its name comes from the town of Buxton, Derbyshire.

== Geography ==
It is bordered by Couridjah to the north, Thirlmere Lakes National Park to the West, Balmoral to the South and Bargo State Recreation Area to the east. The two main roads and the railway line run north-south and development has extended generally east towards Bargo River Gorge.

== Population ==
At the 2021 Census, there were 2,071 people in Buxton. 86.1% were born in Australia and 93.0% spoke only English at home. The most common responses for religion were No Religion 40.1%, Catholic 21.9% and Anglican 21.1%.

== Education ==
Buxton Public School is situated on Hassall Road at the northern extent of the village. Secondary school students travel by bus to Picton High School, Wollondilly Anglican College, or to schools in the Southern Highlands, e.g. Bowral High School and Chevalier College. Buxton Public School has an enrolment of approximately 200 students.

Buxton School of Arts Hall on West Parade, hosts Playgroups, an Art Group and has a Community Garden at the rear of the property. It also is available to hire by community groups, businesses and for social occasions.

== Railway ==
The village developed around a railway station, established in 1883, and later crossing loop on the former Main Southern Railway. A station platform was added in 1893 (The current platform was built for RTM by the Rotary Club Of Picton Inc with the aid of the local RFS and community to help with their tourist service in the 1990s). This line had gradients as steep as 1 in 30, and on 13 July 1919, the railway was deviated to the East. The new line, via Bargo, became the Main Line, and the original line became the Picton Loop line.

The Loop Line was closed in 1978 due to lack of traffic, and road-bridge failure between Colo Vale and Braemar, but the section from Picton to Buxton was retained as a heritage railway, and is still operated by the NSW Rail Museum.

== Buxton Photo Gallery ==
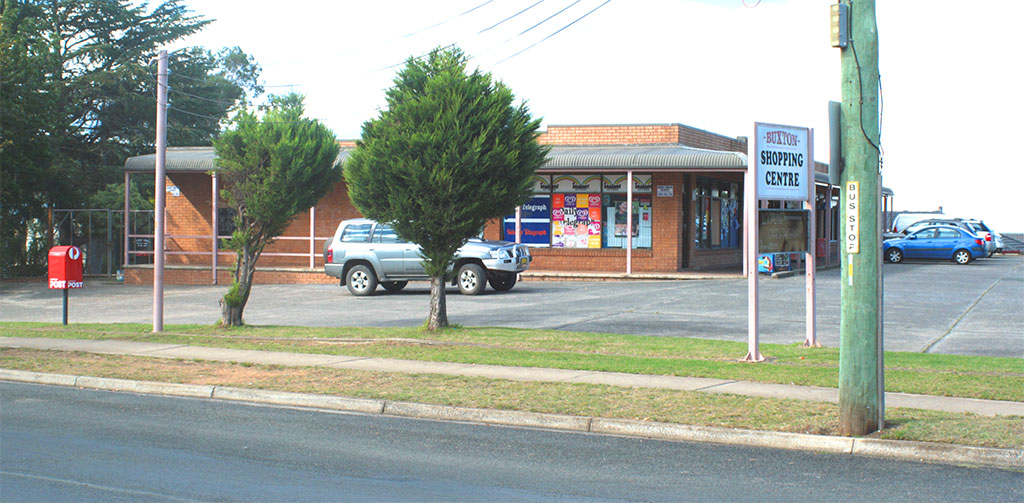
Shopping Centre, East Parade

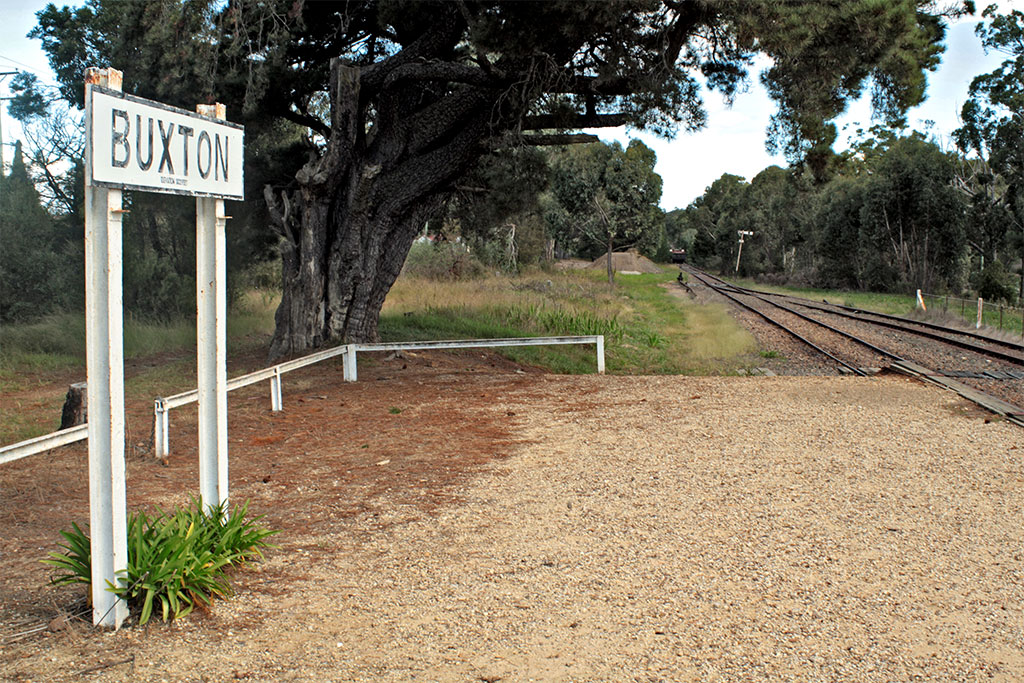
Station on Loop Line (closed)

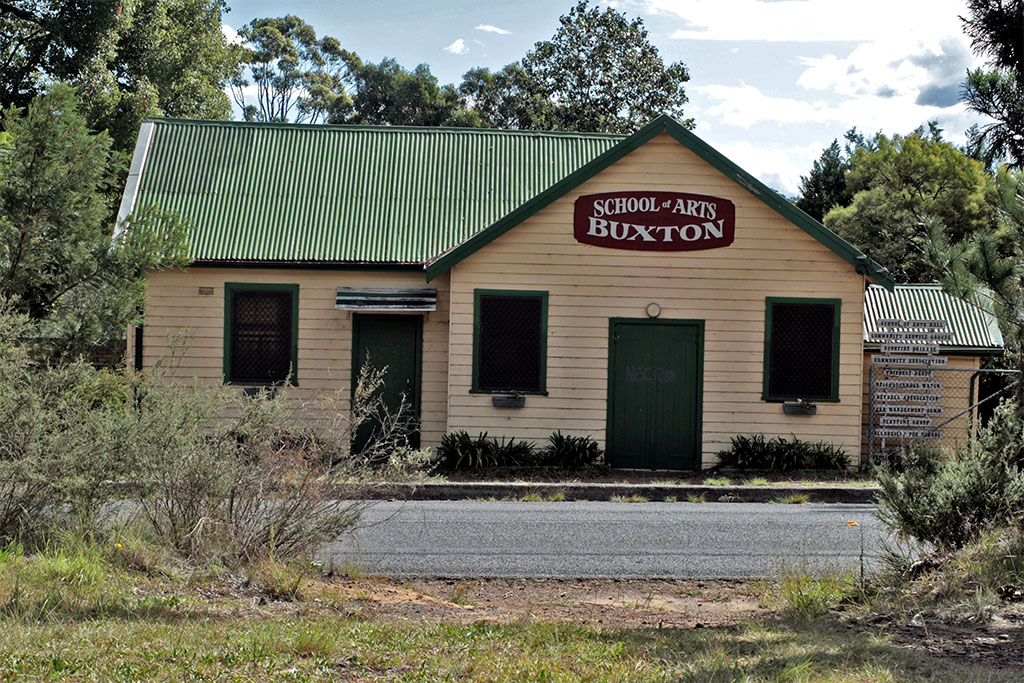
School of Arts Hall

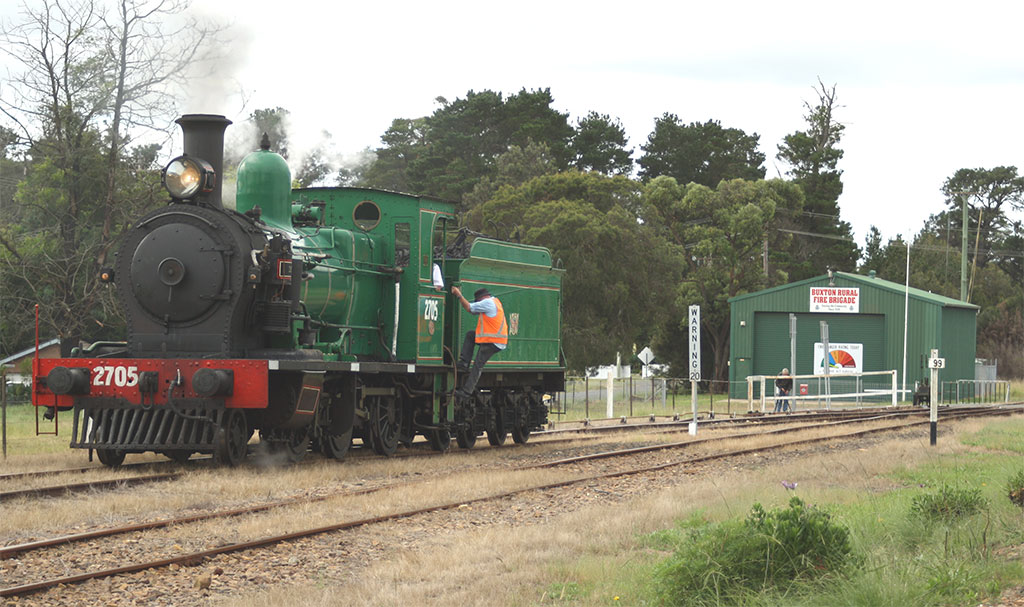
Locomotive at Buxton Station

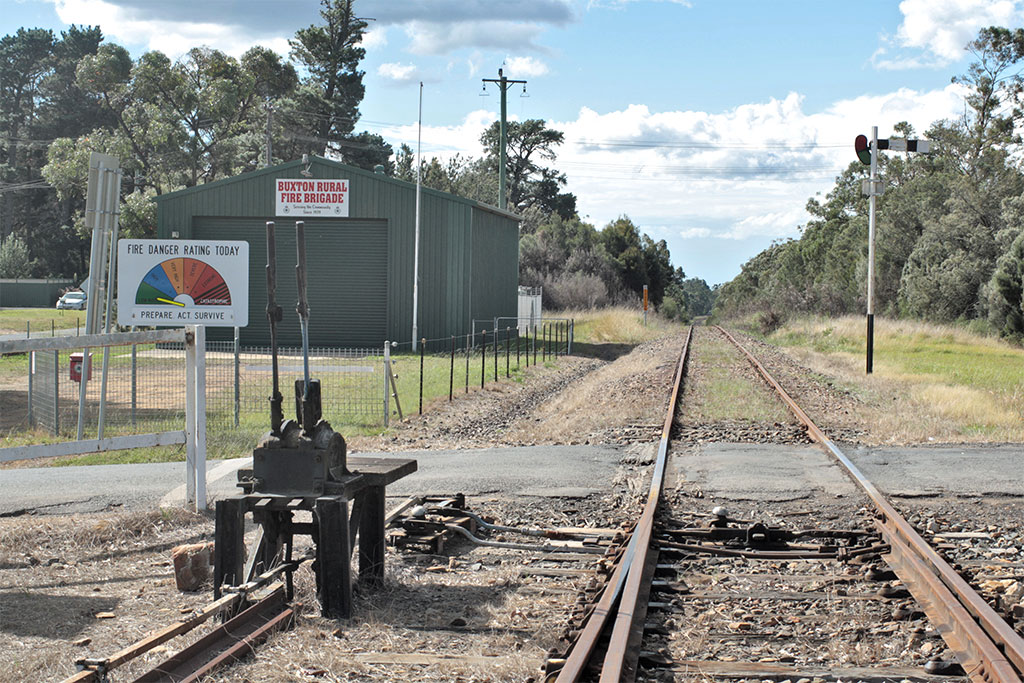
Rural Fire Brigade Shed

== Bibliography ==
- Bayley, W. A. 1973. Picton-Mittagong Loop-Line Railway Bulli: Austrail. ISBN 0-909597-14-6
