= Couridjah, New South Wales =

Couridjah
- Suburb
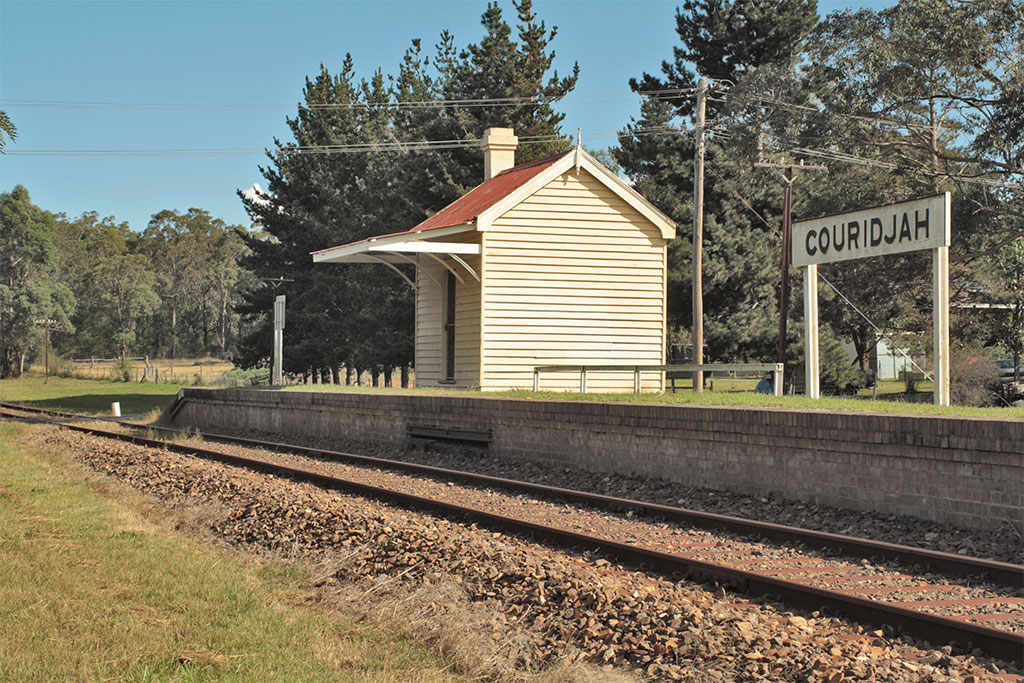

- Coordinates: 34°14′S 150°33′E
- Country: Australia
- State: New South Wales
- Region: Macarthur
- LGA: Wollondilly Shire
- Location: 103 km (64 mi) SW of Sydney CBD; 8 km (5.0 mi) SW of Picton; 33 km (21 mi) NNE of Mittagong

Government
  - State electorate: Wollondilly
  - Federal division: Macarthur
- Elevation: 346 m (1,135 ft)

Population
  - Total: 303 (2016 census)
- Postcode: 2571
Suburbs around Couridjah
Thirlmere	Tahmoor
Thirlmere Lakes National Park	Couridjah
	Buxton	Bargo

Couridjah is a small town in the Macarthur Region of New South Wales, Australia, in Wollondilly Shire. It was previously known officially as "Village of Couridjah". At the 2016 census, Couridjah had a population of 303.

== History ==
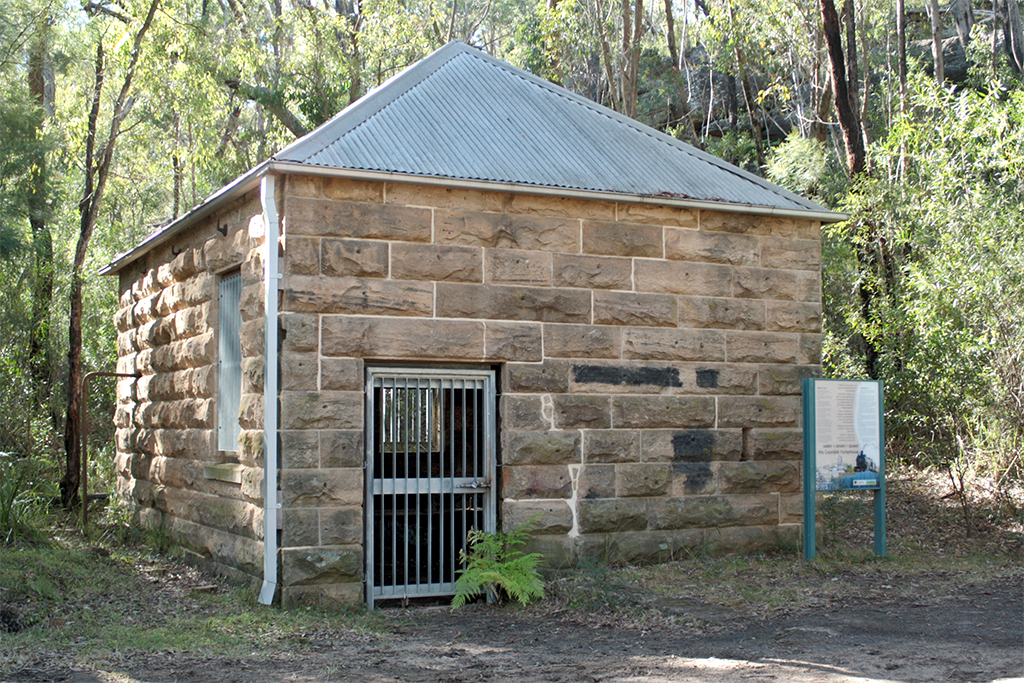
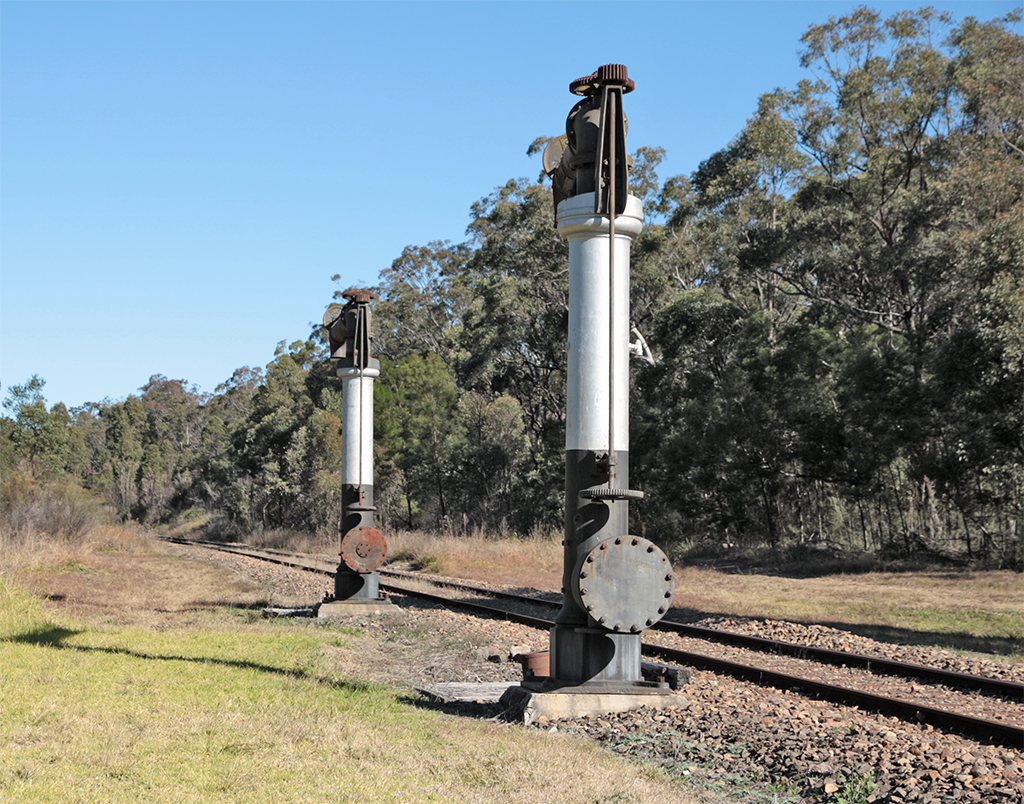
Pumphouse and standpipes

The name "Couridjah" has been variously reported to mean, in a local Aboriginal language, anything from "The Place of the White Ants" to "The Home of the Medicine Man".

Couridjah was formerly a station on the Main Southern Railway. At the time of the line's construction, it was known as "Jones's Hut". That line was deviated in 1919 to a less steep alignment with easier grades, and the original line became the Picton-Mittagong Loop line. Thirlmere Lakes, to the west of the station, supplied water to the standpipes at Couridjah for replenishing steam locomotives, after their long haul up the steep grade from Picton. The lakes were formerly known as the "Coridja Lagoons" and "Picton Lagoons". The sandstone pump-house is still in existence adjacent to the Lakes. The standpipes, too, remain near the station, but have been disused since 1964.

== Heritage listings ==
Couridjah has a number of heritage-listed sites, including:

- Main Southern railway: Couridjah railway station

== Couridjah today ==
The platform and the small waiting room have been restored and are maintained by volunteers from the NSW Rail Museum at Thirlmere, though none of the Heritage trains which still use sections of the Picton Loop line stops there.

The station and platform were featured in a television advertisement for "Minties" lollies.

The main premises of the Tharawal Local Aboriginal Land Council are located at Couridjah. It is also the location of Picton Lakes Village, a settlement established in 1925 for sufferers of tuberculosis.

Couridjah has no shop, post office, or any other public building, nor any main street. It is chiefly a semi-rural residential area, among which are some small orchards and poultry farms.

== Bibliography ==
- Chalk, Karyn. 20078. A brief history of Couridjah in the Wollondilly Shire of New South Wales Australia. New South Wales : Lulu. ISBN 978-1-4092-7612-8
- Wright, Harry. "Picton Locomotive Depot and the Picton-Mittagong Loop Line", Roundhouse Vol. 41, No. 2, April 2004. pp. 5–15
