= Buxton railway station, New South Wales =

Former railway station in New South Wales, Australia

Buxton
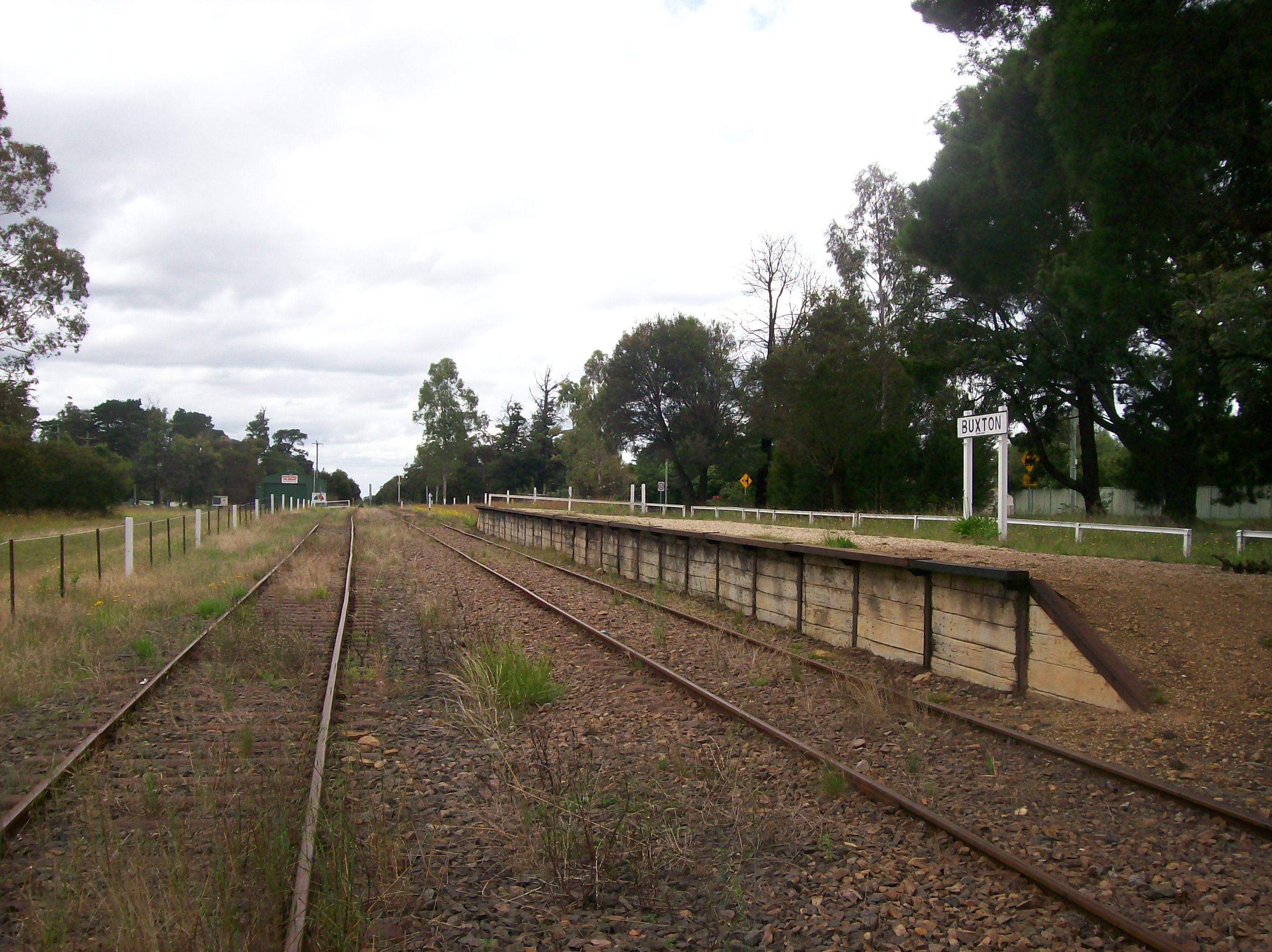
- Northbound view of the rebuilt platform in January 2006

General information
- Location: Buxton, New South Wales; Australia
- Coordinates: 34°15′20″S 150°32′01″E
- Operator: NSW Rail Museum
- Lines: Picton–Mittagong loop line Main Southern line
- Platforms: 1 (1 side)
- Tracks: 2

Construction
- Structure type: Ground

Other information
- Status: Reused

History
- Opened: 20 October 1893
- Closed: 5 August 1978
- Rebuilt: 1990s

Services
Preceding station	Former services	Following station
Balmoral towards Mittagong	Picton–Mittagong Loop Line	Couridjah towards Picton
Location

Buxton railway station is a heritage railway station located on the Picton–Mittagong loop railway line, serving the village of Buxton in the Macarthur Region, New South Wales, Australia.

== History ==
The station opened on 20 October 1893, and a platform was later added on 4 November. The station along with the rest of the loop line was closed in 1978.

The station is located on a crossing loop. The original station building was demolished after burning down. The current platform was built for by the NSW Rail Museum (RTM) for their tourist service in the 1990s.

RTM (through Transport Heritage NSW) operates heritage steam and diesel trains on the line to the station, from Thirlmere & Picton, most weekends.

== Image gallery ==
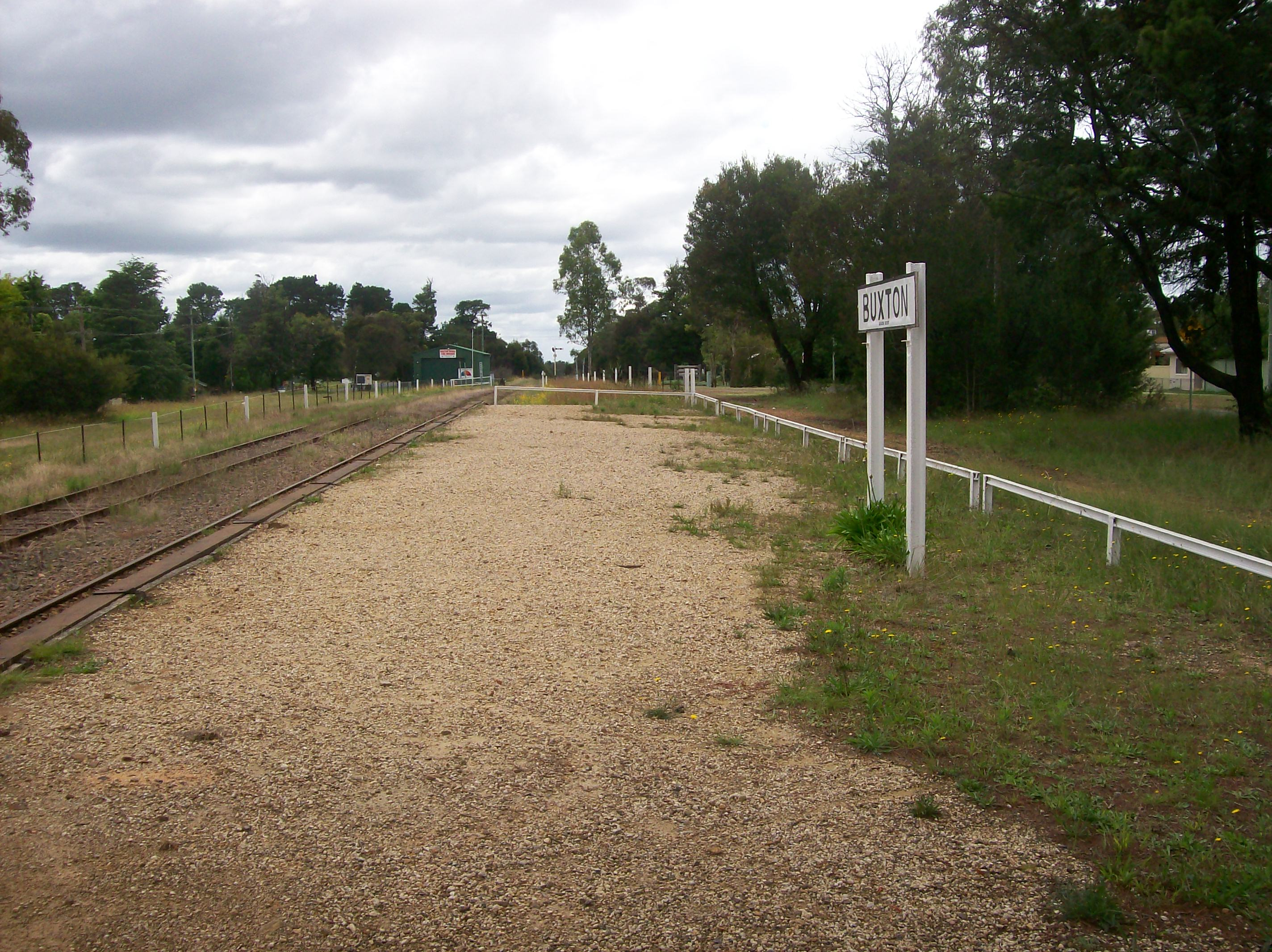
Looking north on the platform

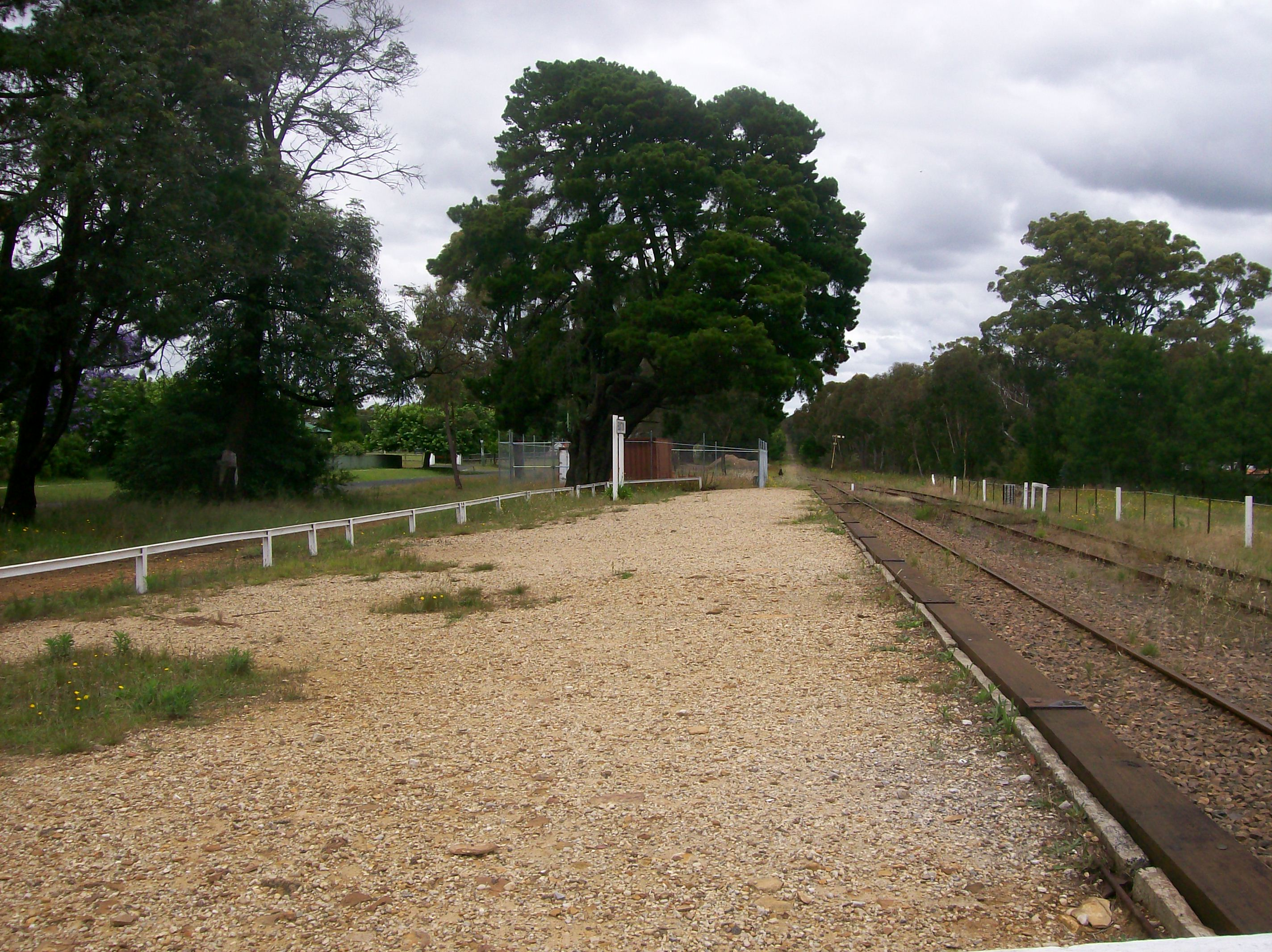
Looking south on the platform

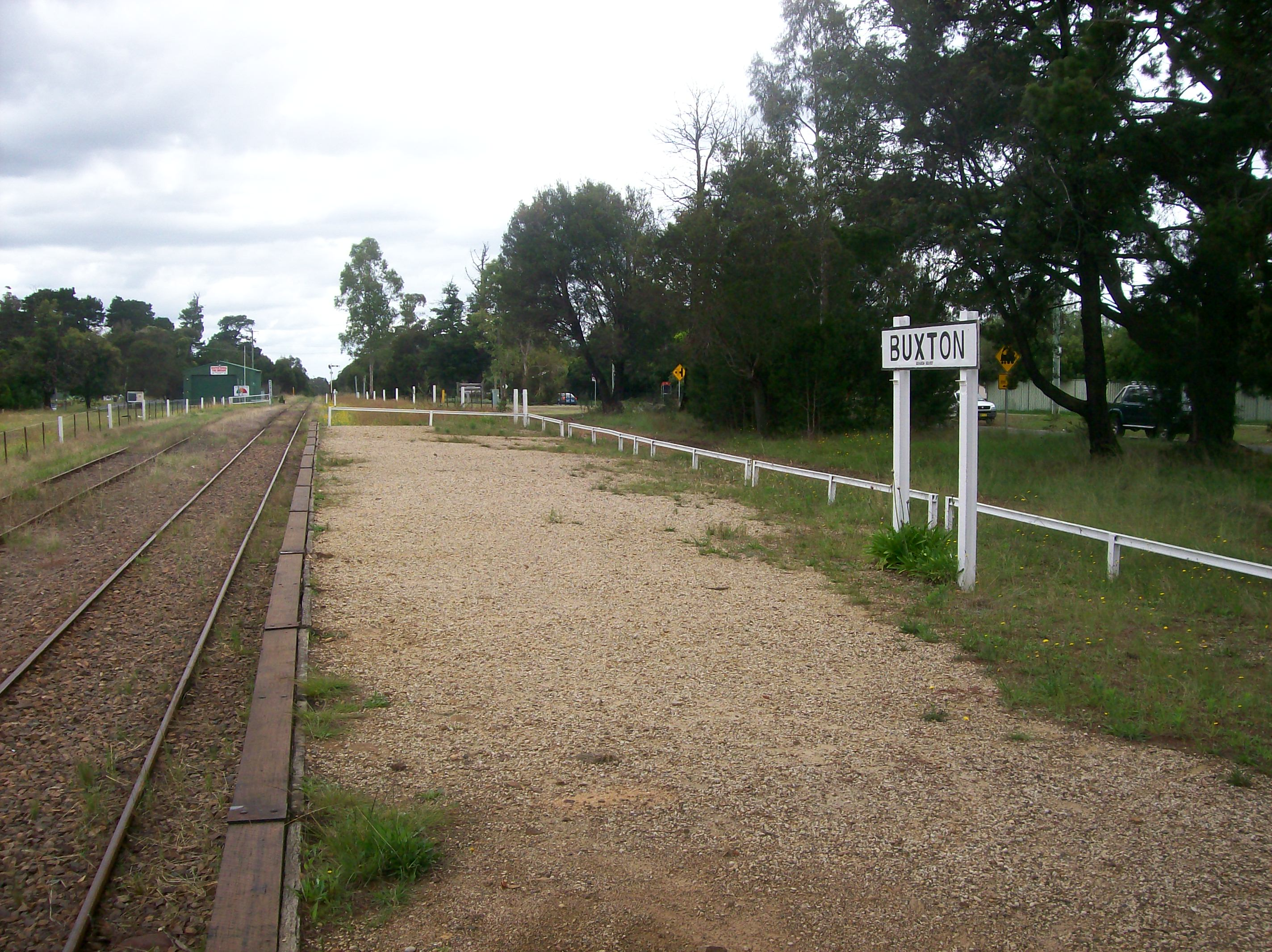
Looking north on the platform

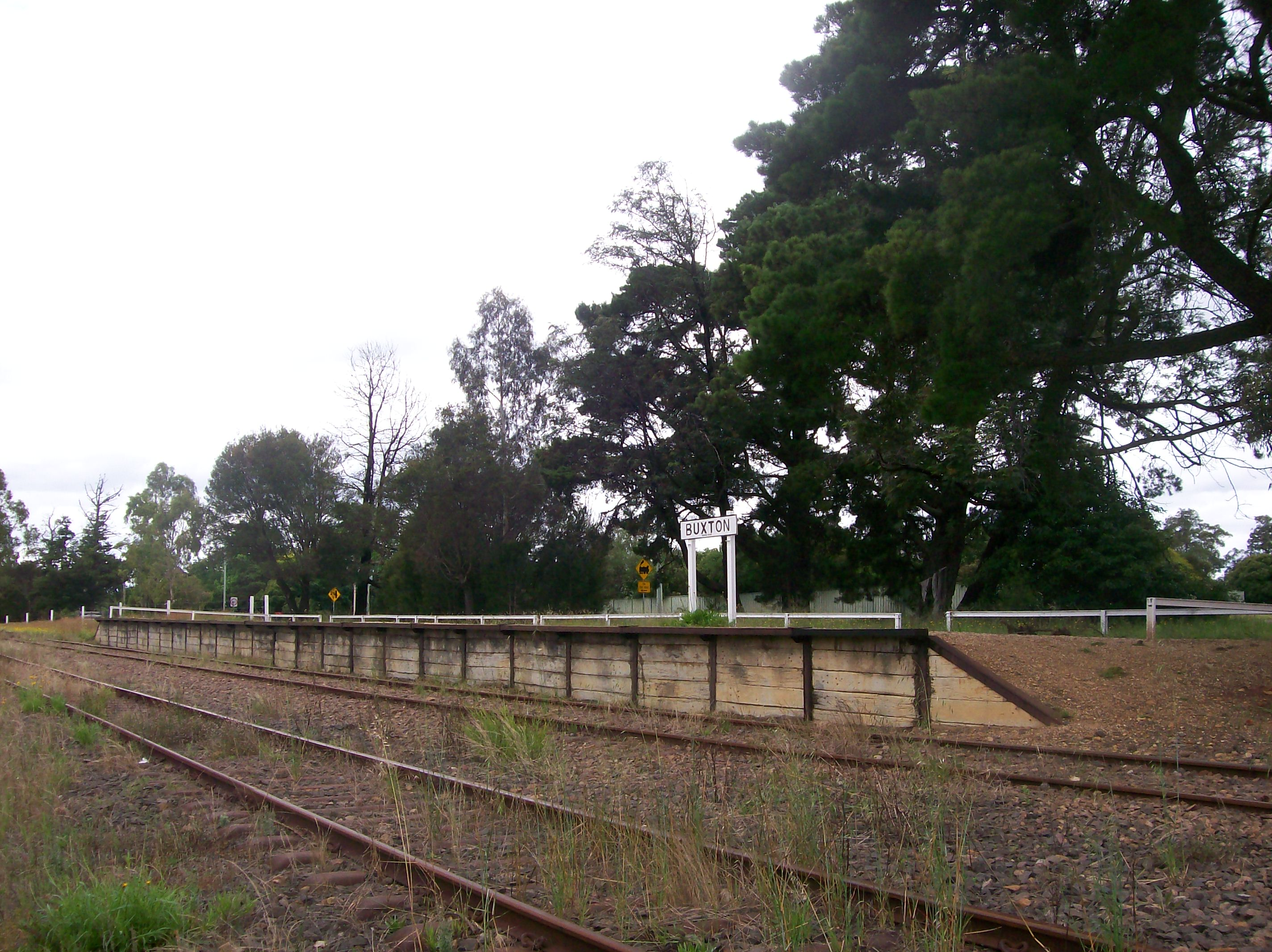
Platform seen from south end

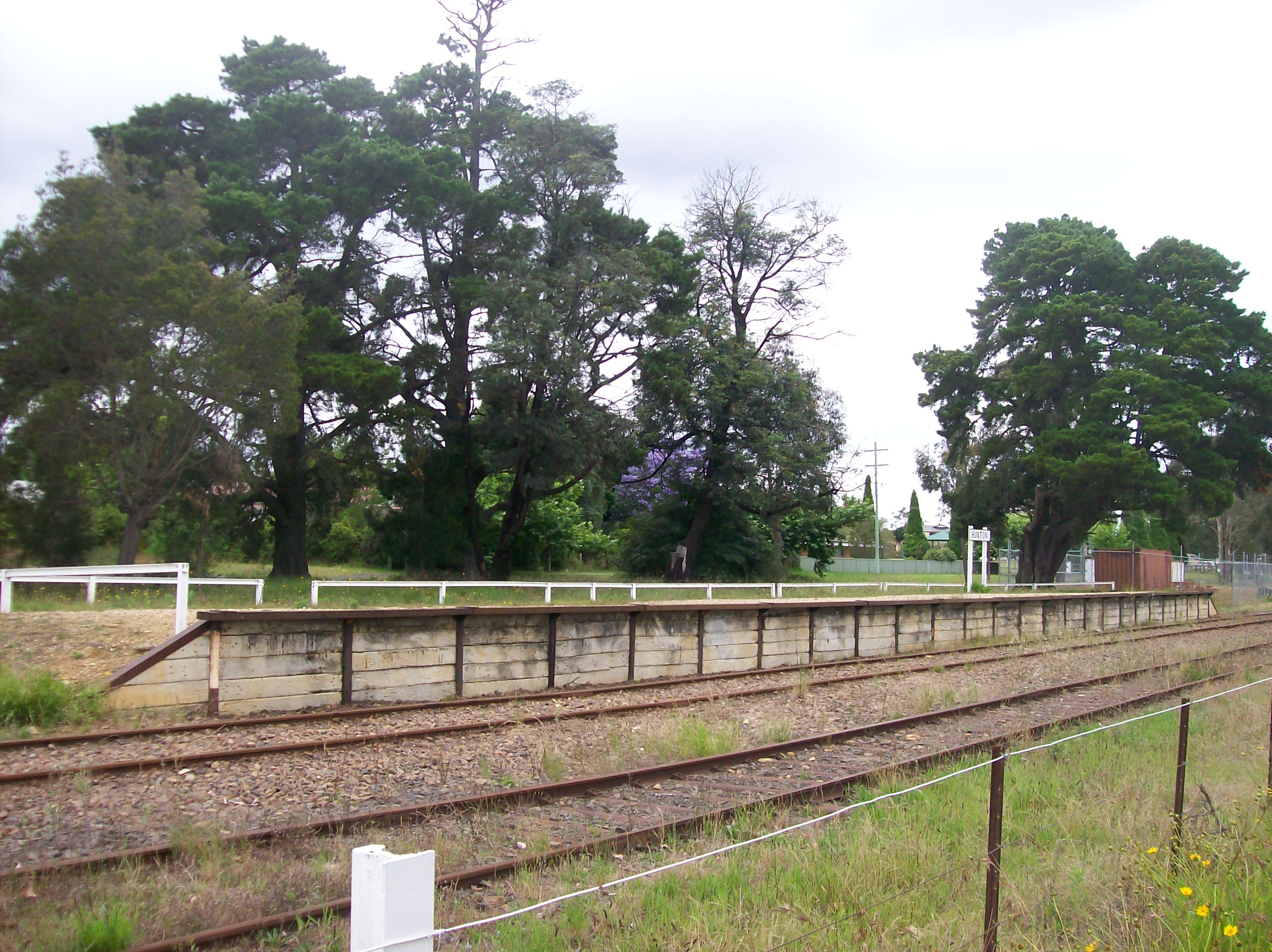
Platform seen from north end

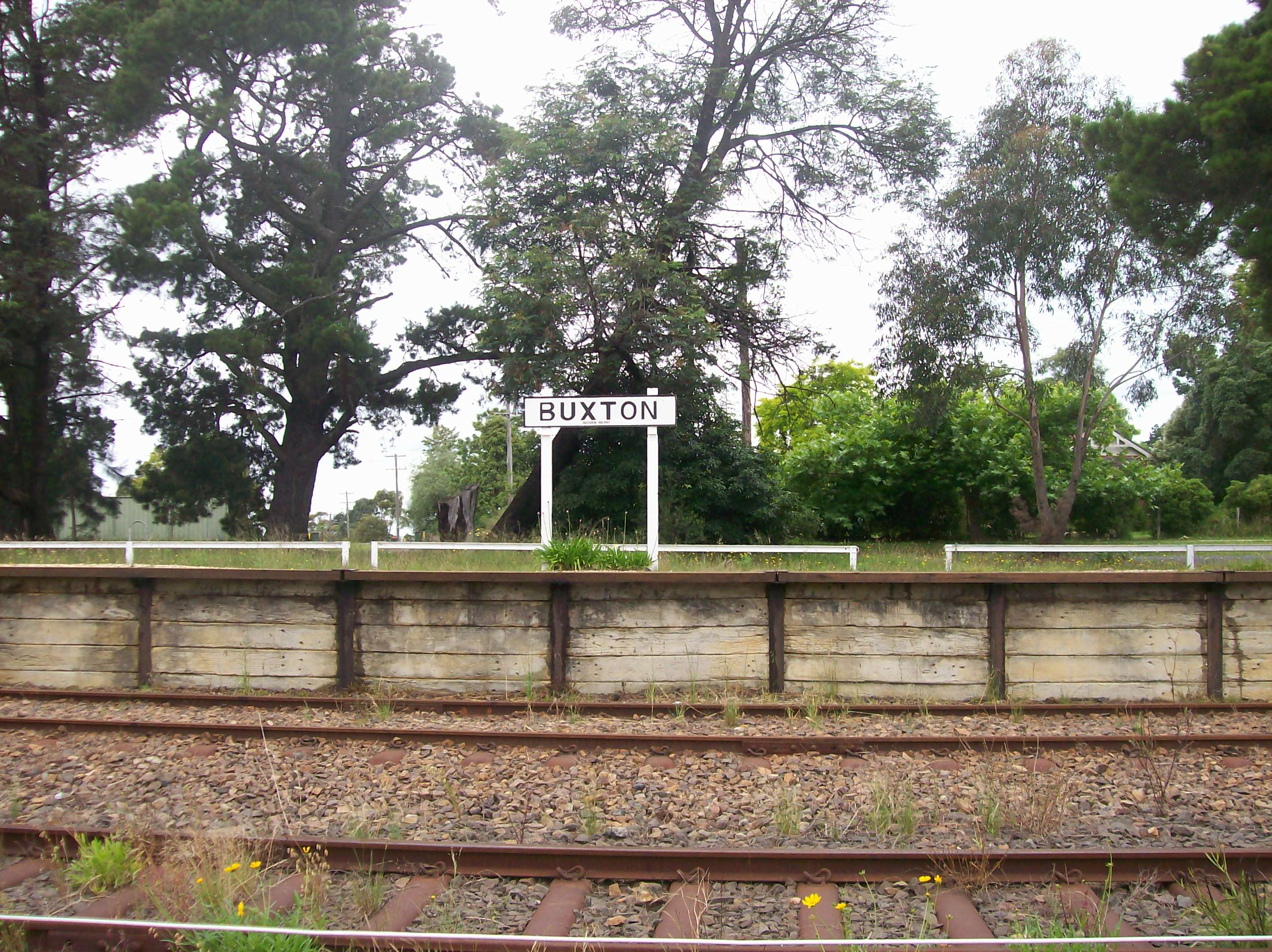
Platform seen from exterior

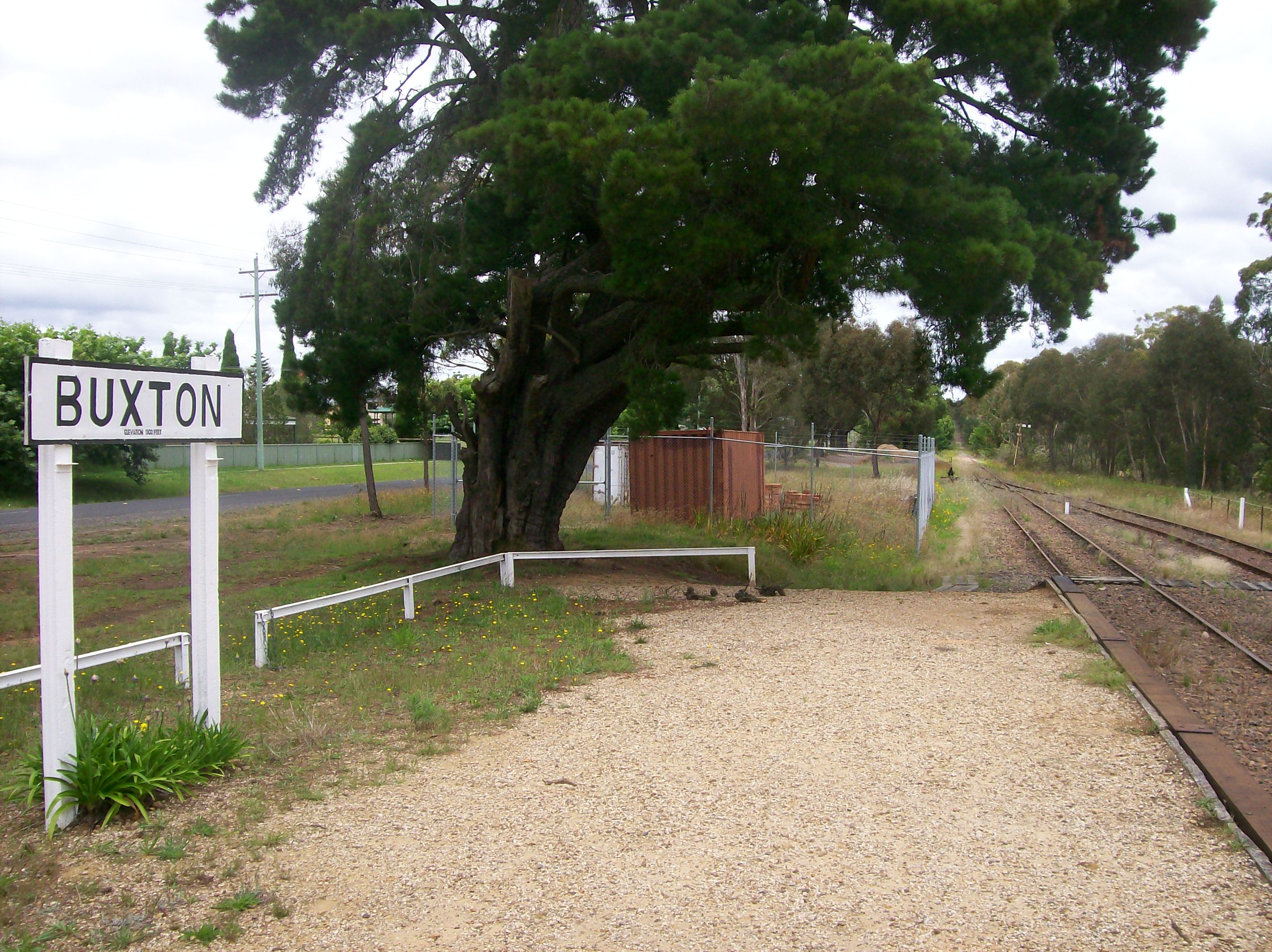
Looking towards south end

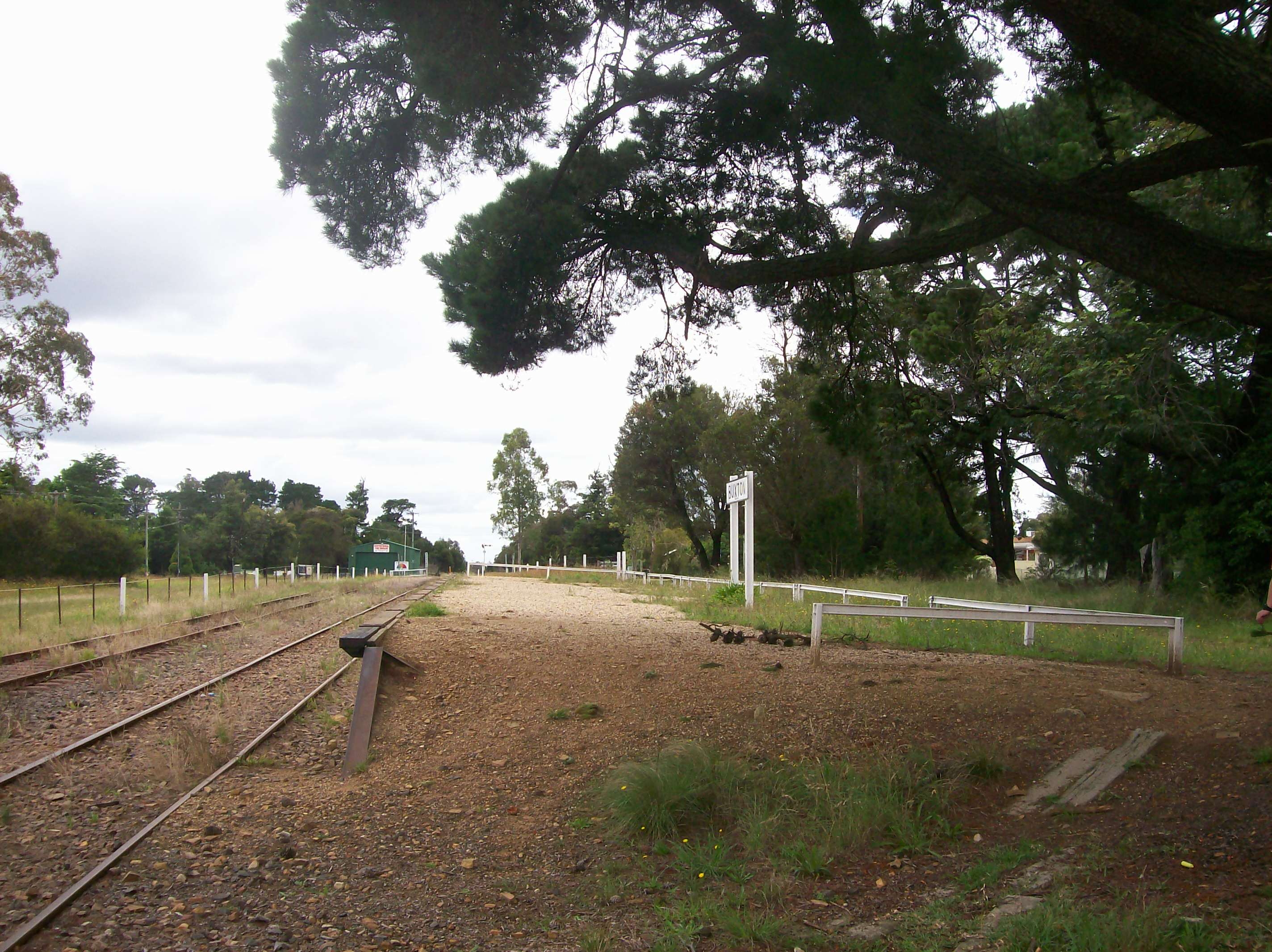
South end

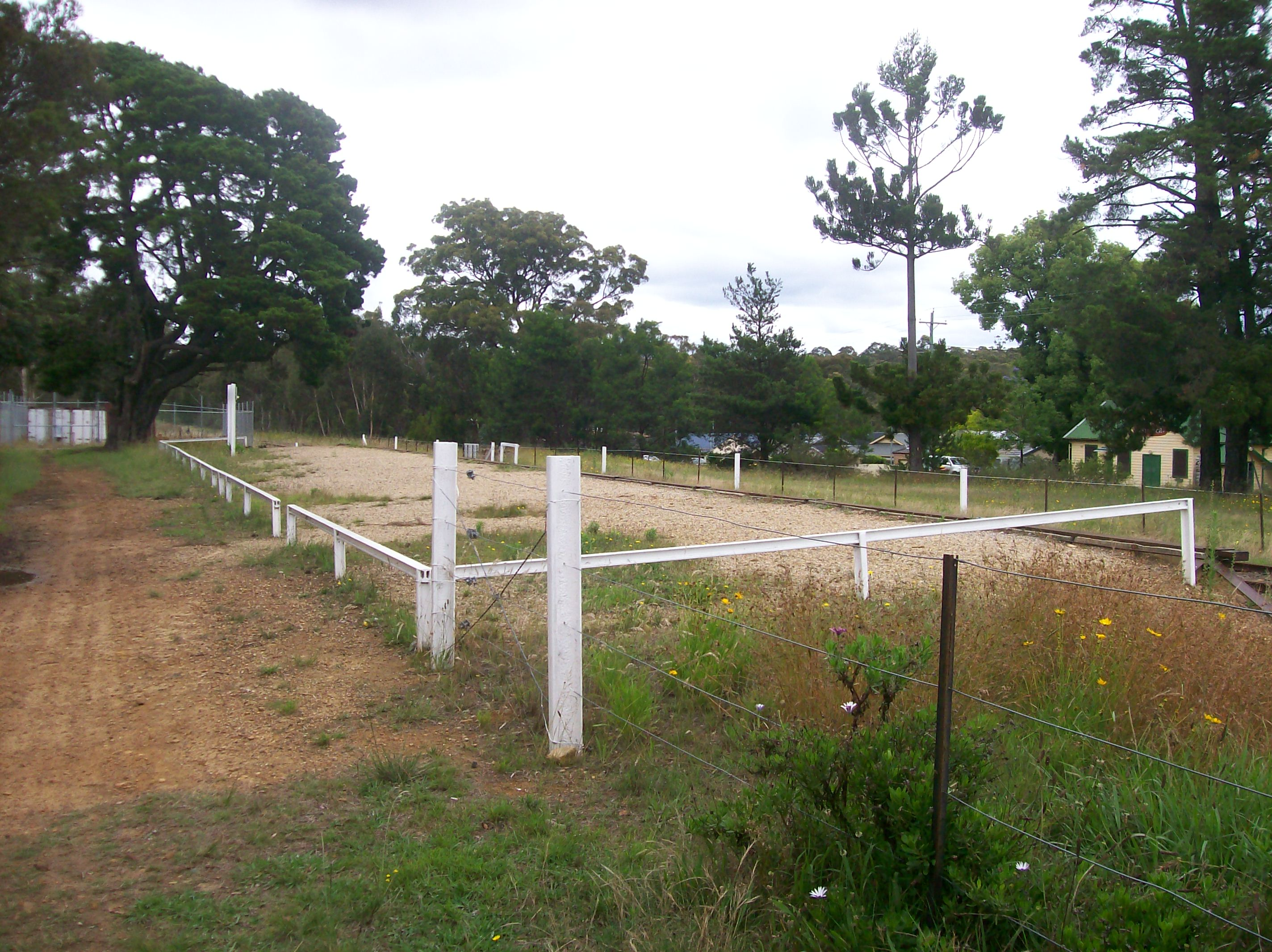
Exterior side of platform seen from north end
