= Thirlmere, New South Wales =

Town in New South Wales, Australia

Thirlmere
- Town
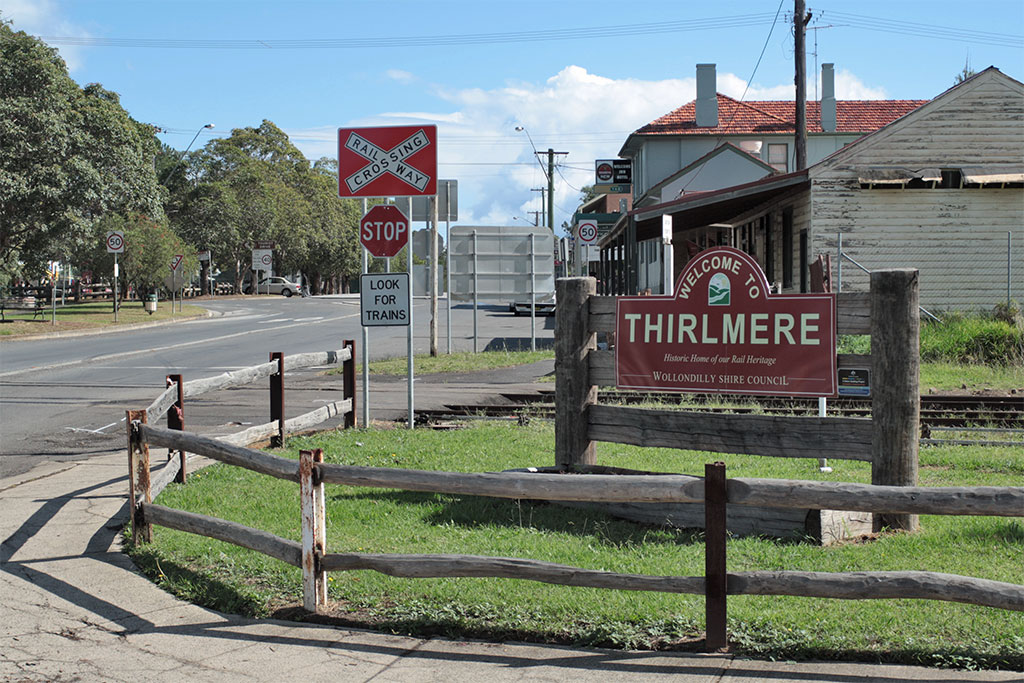
- A railway crossing in Thirlmere

- Coordinates: 34°12′S 150°34′E
- Country: Australia
- State: New South Wales
- Region: Macarthur
- LGA: Wollondilly Shire
- Location: 89 km (55 mi) SW of Sydney CBD; 36 km (22 mi) NE of Mittagong; 210 km (130 mi) N of Canberra; 51 km (32 mi) NW of Wollongong

Government
  - State electorate: Wollondilly
  - Federal division: Hume
- Elevation: 300 m (980 ft)

Population
  - Total: 4,986 (SAL 2021)
- Postcode: 2572
Localities around Thirlmere
Mowbray Park	Mowbray Park	Picton
Lakesland	Thirlmere	Tahmoor
Thirlmere Lakes National Park	Buxton	Couridjah

Thirlmere is a small semi-rural town in the Macarthur Region of Sydney in New South Wales, Australia, in the Wollondilly Shire. Popularly known for its railway origins, the town is located 89 km south west of the Sydney Central Business District. At the 2021 census, Thirlmere had a population of 4,986.

Thirlmere was previously known as Village of Thirlmere and was originally named after Thirlmere in England.

== History ==
The Thirlmere area was first explored by the British in 1798, whose attention was focussed more on the Thirlmere Lakes area and finding an alternate route north towards Bathurst.

Thirlmere boomed with the creation of the Great Southern Railway in 1863 to 1867, when the area was blanketed in tents to house the many railway workers that came to the area to work. Thirlmere was valued mostly for the proximity of the Thirlmere Lakes (then called Picton Lakes) which were used to provide water for the steam trains. During this period, Thirlmere was also the home for a number of timber mills, whose main product was the milling of sleepers for the railway line.

The Thirlmere section of the Main Southern Railway was deviated in 1919 to a less steep alignment with easier grades, and the original line became the Picton Loop Line. This transformed the village from a hive of steam train activity to a quiet farming region, mainly supplying the surrounding villages with foods and goods.

== Heritage listings ==
Thirlmere has a number of heritage-listed sites, including:

- NSW Rail Transport Museum Barbour Road: Rail Paybus FP1

== Demographics ==
The 2021 census showed Thirlmere's population to be 4,986, with a gender split of 48.7% males to 51.3% females. 83.4% of the population was born in Australia, 3.8% born in England, 0.9% in New Zealand, 0.5% in Scotland, 0.5% in Lebanon and 0.5% in the Philippines. The most common ancestries in Thirlmere were Australian 44.5%, English 40.3%, Irish 10.2%, Scottish 9.2% and Australian Aboriginal 4.1%.

== Environment ==
The area's highest recorded temperature is 42.8 °C. Its lowest recorded temperature is -10.0 °C. The area receives an average of 812.6mm of annual rainfall. The highest recorded rainfall was 245.9mm in one day. The area, part of Sydney's water catchment area, experiences most of its rainfall from January to March.

Thirlmere Lakes National Park is an important environmental area - it is a series of lakes which have a sandstone bed. The lakes area is generally sheltered, providing an ideal home to many freshwater inhabitants such as platypuses, mussels, jellyfish, and a wide variety of water birds. The parks is also host to a significant wombat population.

The area's dense bushland surroundings make the town vulnerable to bushfires, with fires destroying a house in 2006.

== Attractions ==
=== NSW Rail Museum ===
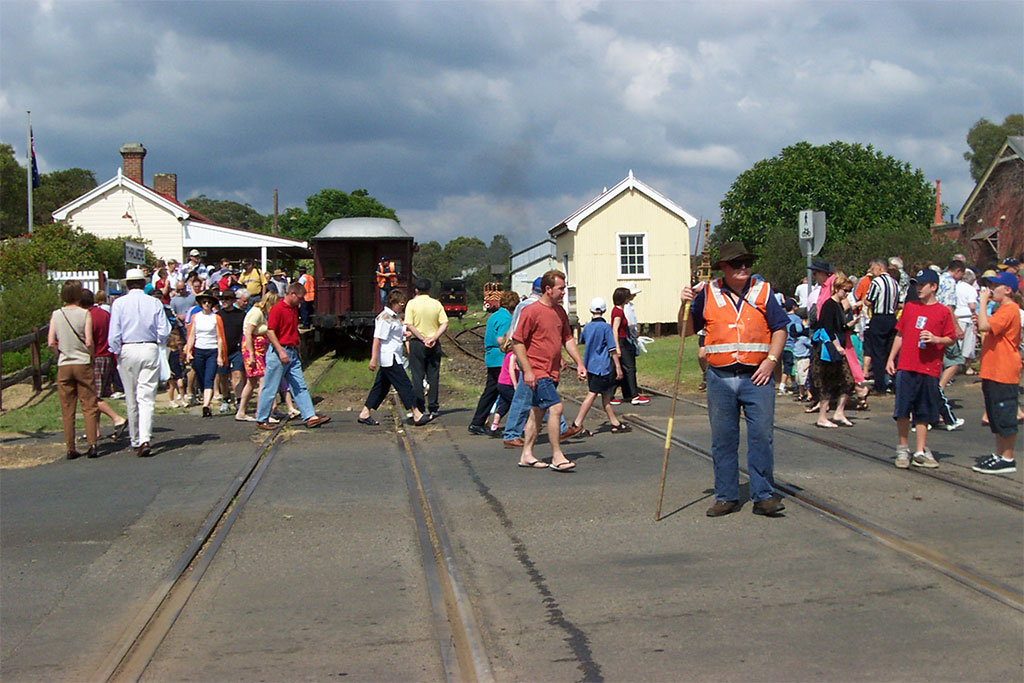
Festival of Steam 2002

The NSW Rail Museum is Australia's largest and oldest railway museum with over 125 railway exhibits. It is the home to many steam and diesel locomotives, the most popular of which is the famous 3801. Steam train rides are available on Sundays during the winter months, to avoid the risk of bushfire in this rural area.

Each year on the first Sunday in May, the town's population grows to over 15,000 as tourists flock to the "Thirlmere Festival of Steam" - NSW's premier annual steam event featuring the state's biggest gathering of main-line steam locos and all the fun of the fair and markets.

The museum also operates excursion trains from Sydney to Thirlmere hauled by steam and/or diesel locomotives.

=== Thirlmere Lakes National Park ===
As well as being an important environment ecosystem, Thirlmere Lakes (managed by the NSW Parks & Wildlife Service) is a popular picnic spot for locals and day trippers from Sydney, who take advantage of the free electric barbecues. Covering an area of 627 hectares (1,550 acres), there are several sand beaches, with the lakes (with a maximum depth of 6m) being popular for kayaking and canoeing. Thirlmere Lakes was also a popular location for locals to swim.

There are a few bush walking trails with the longest being a 16 km return trip. Camping is not allowed.

== Film and television ==
Due to the easy access to working steam trains, Thirlmere has been the scene for a number of television commercials and television shows.

Perhaps the most popular television series filmed at Thirlmere was the Channel Seven series Always Greener, from 2001 to 2003.

== Gallery ==
Thirlmere Images

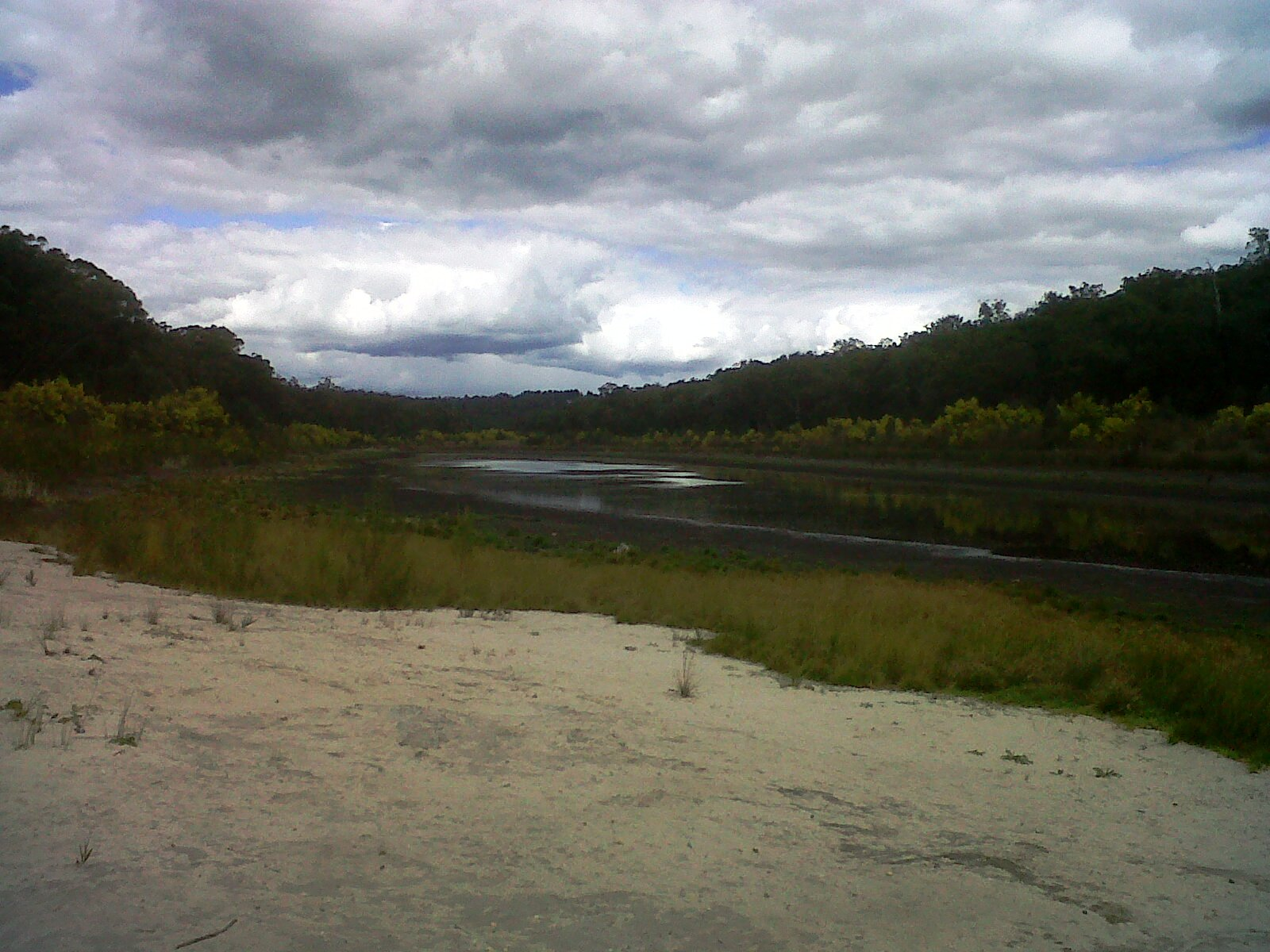
Thirlmere Lakes

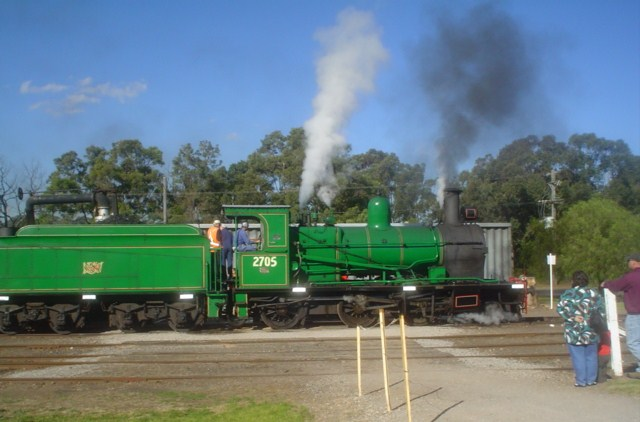
A museum locomotive
hauling a tourist train, 2007

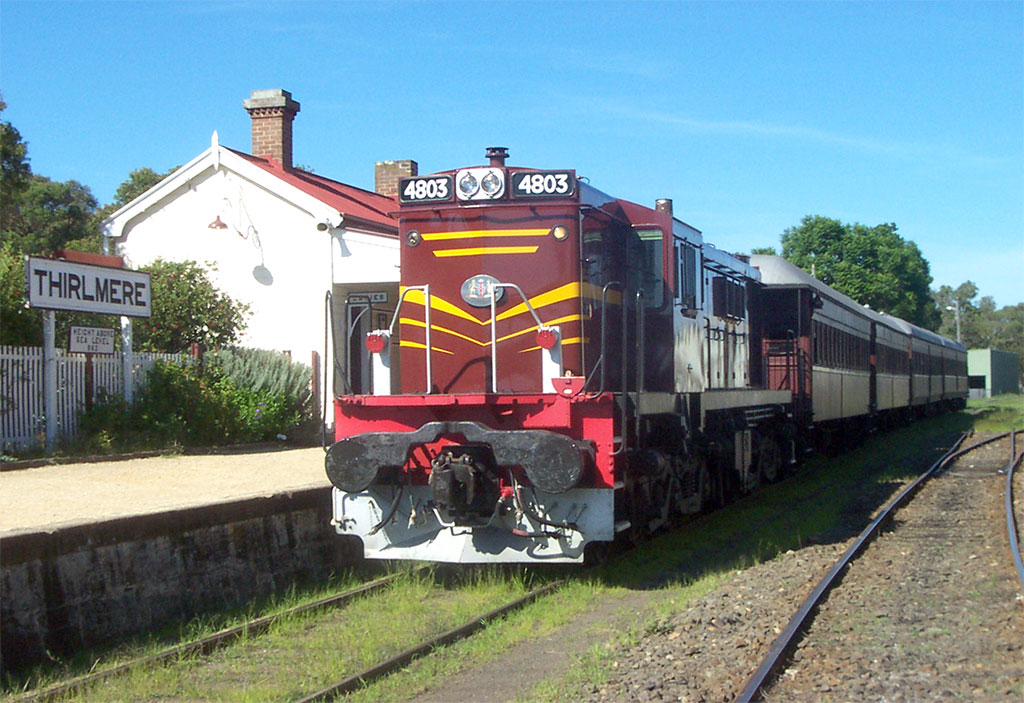
Diesel museum locomotive
with excursion train, 2002

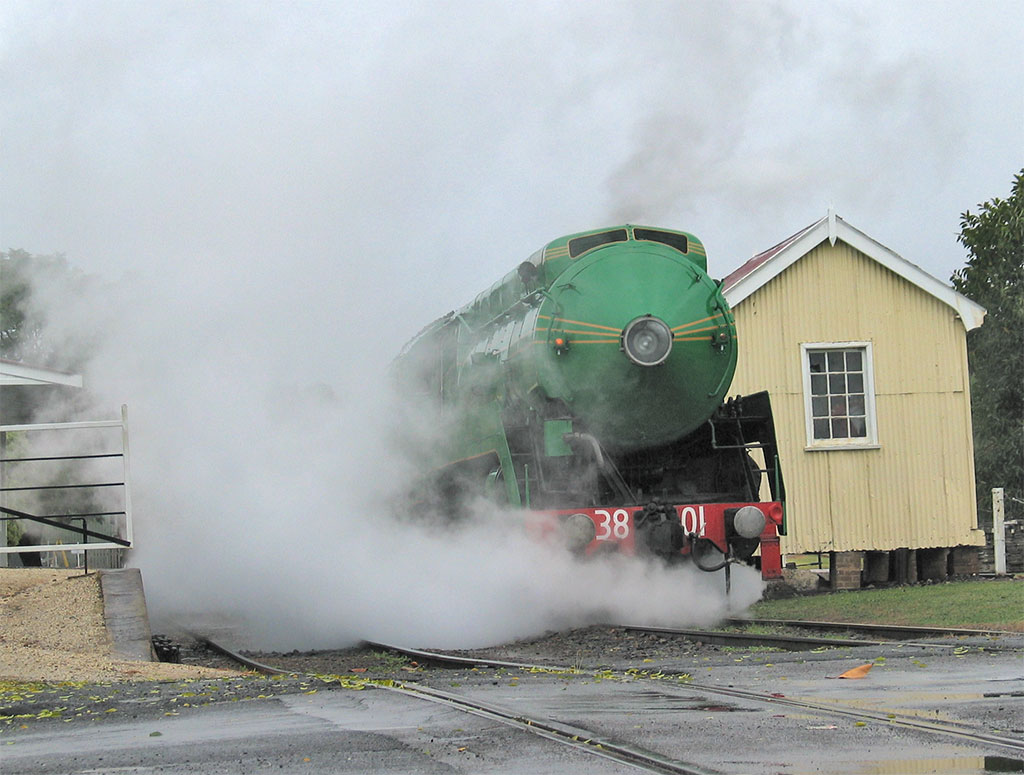
Locomotive 3801, 2007

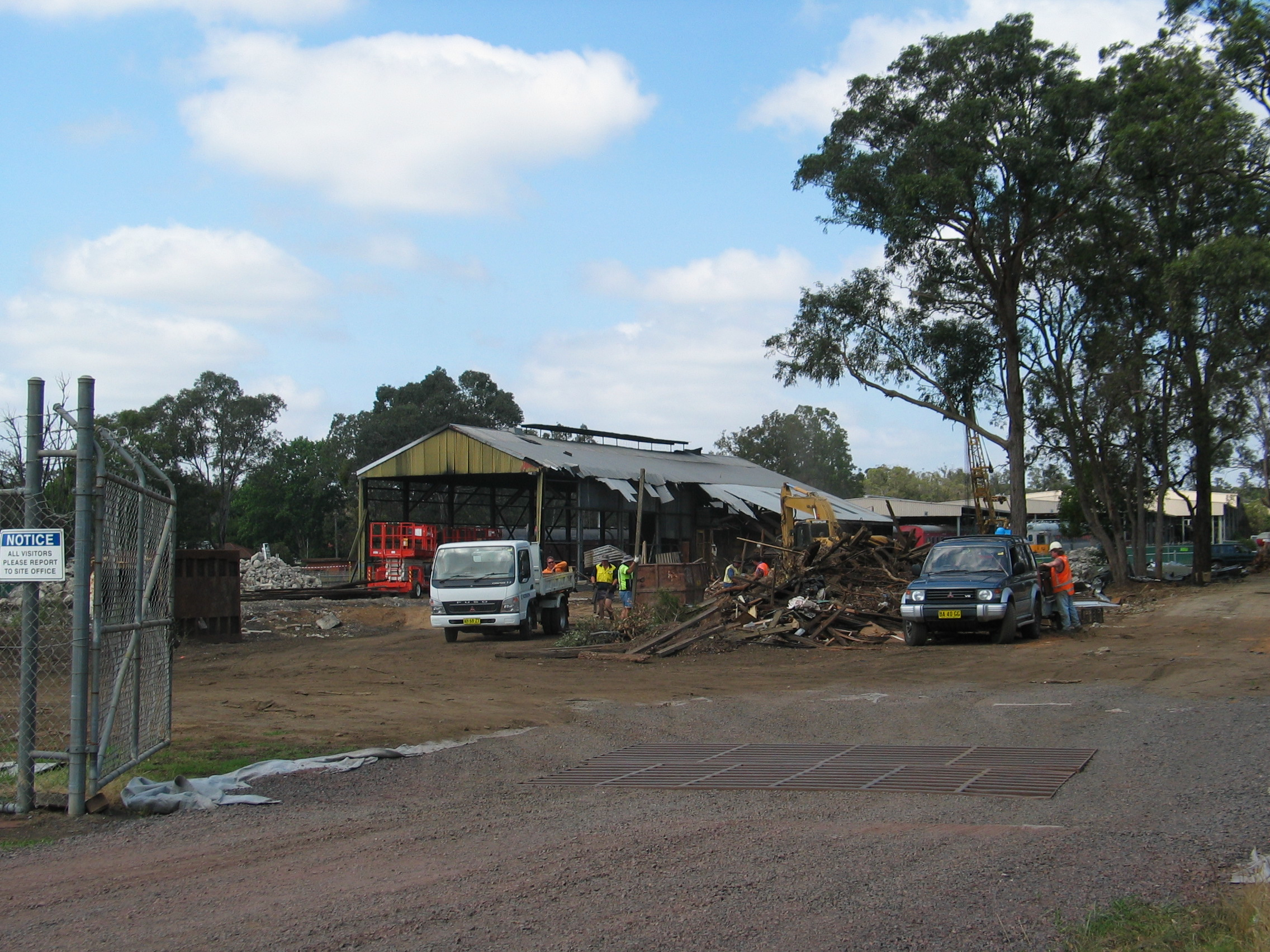
The Rail Museum undergoing renovation,
November 2009

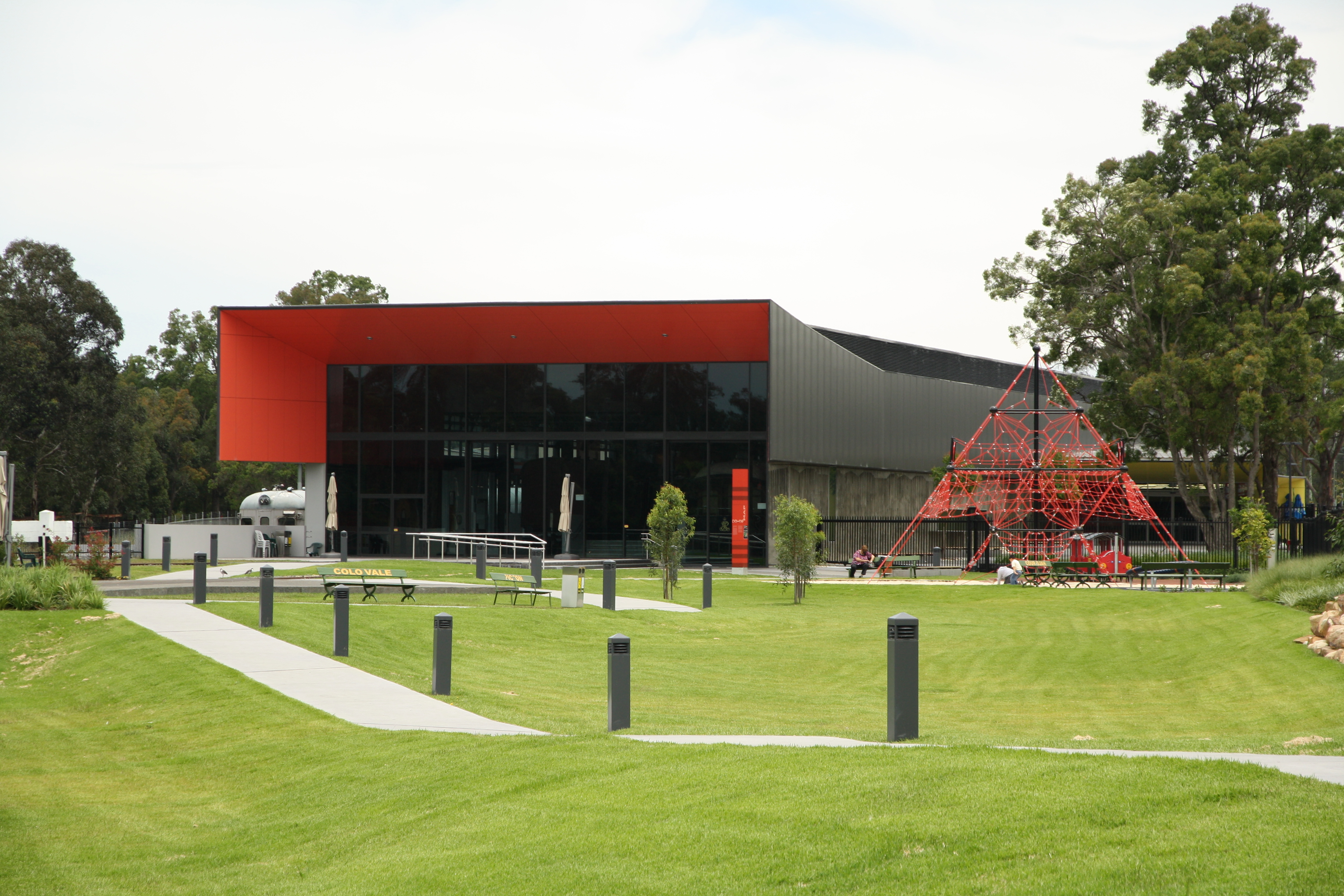
The Rail Museum after renovation, December 2011,
now known as Trainworks

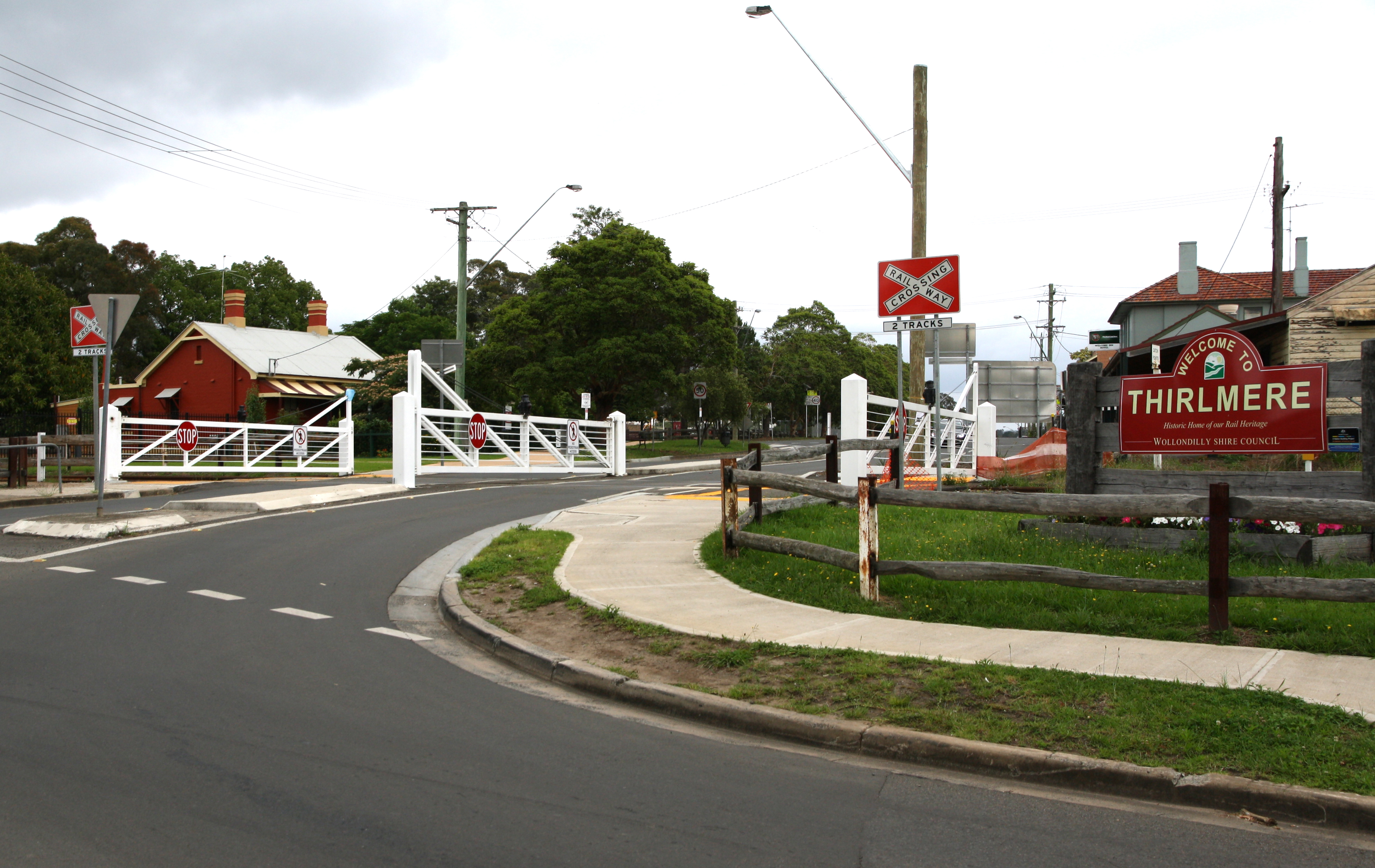
Thirlmere Oaks St

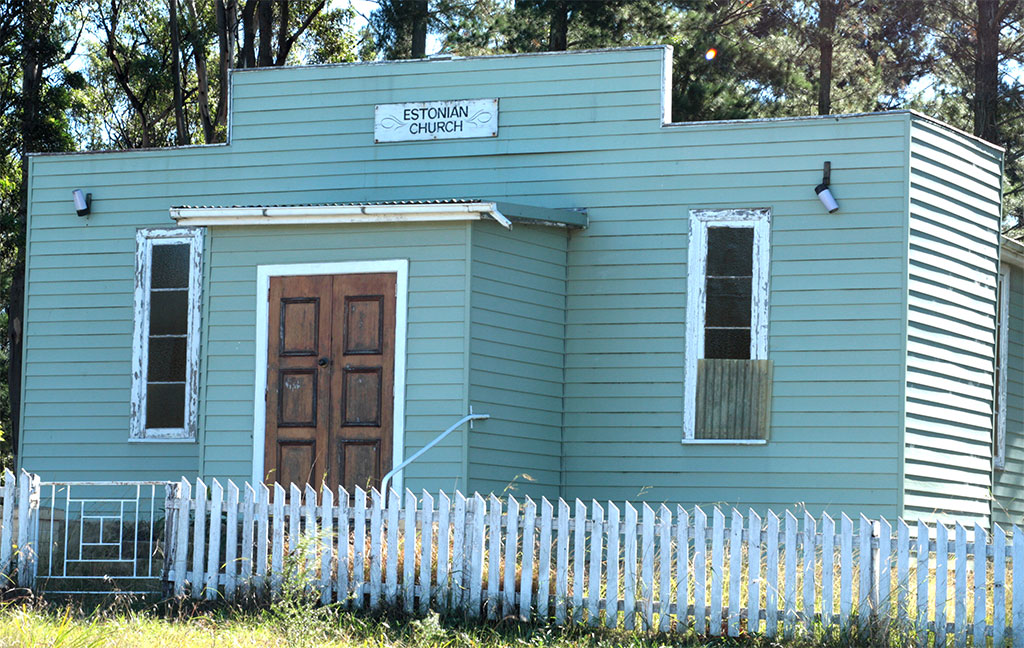
Former Estonian Church, circa 2010

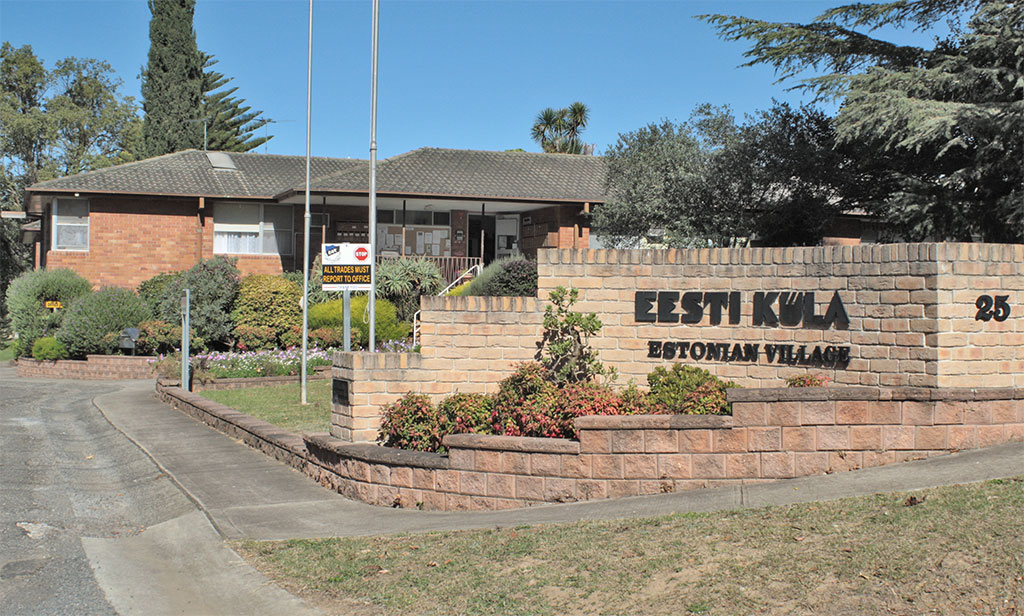
Estonian Retirement Village

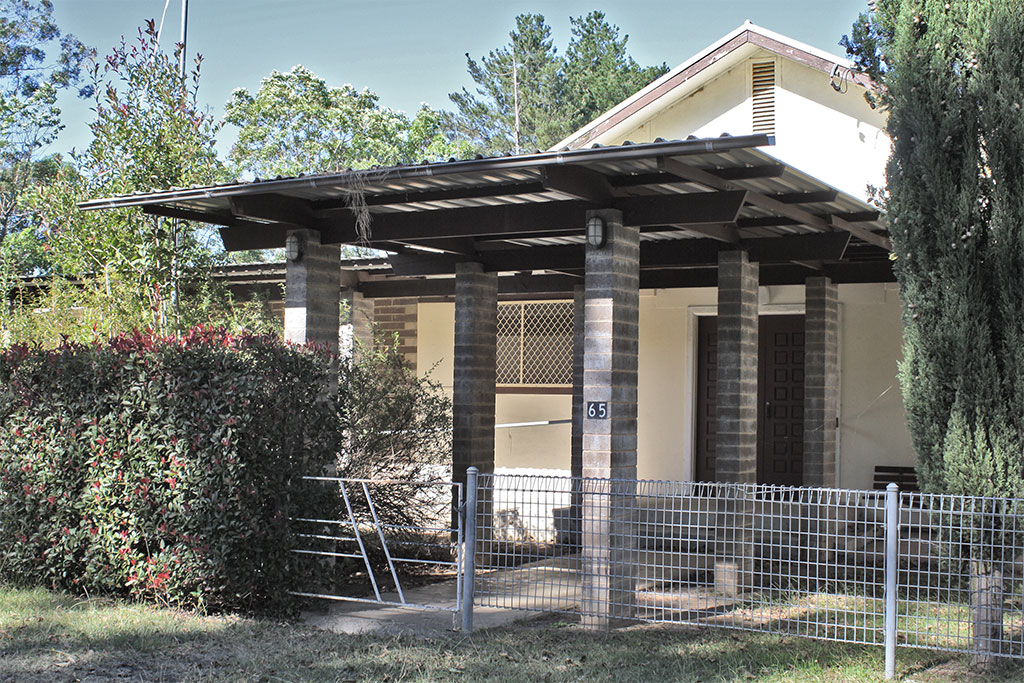
Estonian Hall

== See also ==
- Campbelltown, New South Wales

== Bibliography ==
- Bayley, W. A. 1975. Picton-Mittagong Main Line Railway. Bulli: Austrail. ISBN 0-909597-15-4
- Bayley, W. A. 1973. Picton-Mittagong Loop-Line Railway. Bulli: Austrail. ISBN 0-909597-14-6
