= Goulburn County =

Goulburn
- Cadastral division
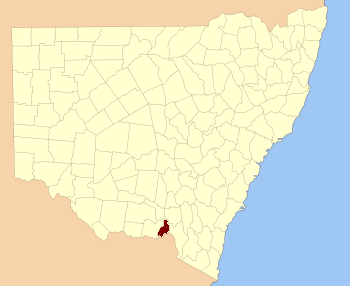
- Location in New South Wales
- Country: Australia
- State: New South Wales
Lands administrative divisions around Goulburn
Mitchell	Wynyard	Wynyard
Hume	Goulburn	Selwyn
Bogong (Vic)	Benambra (Vic)	Selwyn

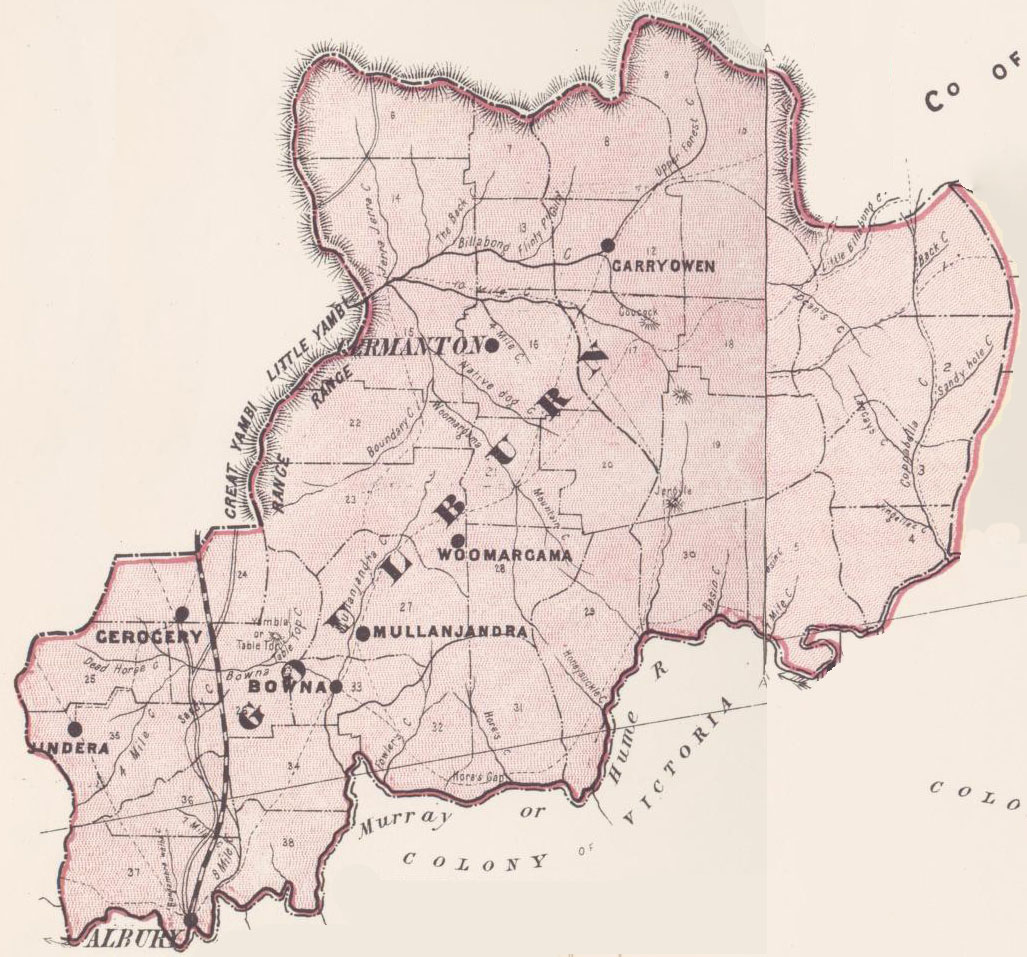
1886 map of Goulburn county

Goulburn County is one of the 141 cadastral divisions of New South Wales. It contains the city of Albury, and the towns of Jindera, Bowna and Woomargama.

Goulburn County was named in honour of the statesman, Henry Goulburn (1784–1856).

== Parishes within this county ==
A full list of parishes found within this county; their current LGA and mapping coordinates to the approximate centre of each location is as follows:

Parish	LGA	Coordinates
Albury	City of Albury	36°02′54″S 146°54′04″E
Back Creek	Greater Hume Shire Council	35°37′54″S 147°21′04″E
Billabung	Greater Hume Shire Council	35°37′54″S 147°30′04″E
Bowna	Greater Hume Shire Council	35°59′54″S 146°03′04″E
Carabobala	Greater Hume Shire Council	35°40′54″S 147°15′04″E
Carabost	Greater Hume Shire Council	35°35′54″S 147°33′04″E
Coocook	Greater Hume Shire Council	35°43′54″S 147°33′04″E
Cookardinia	Greater Hume Shire Council	35°35′54″S 147°15′04″E
Coppabella	Greater Hume Shire Council	35°44′54″S 147°42′04″E
Cumboroona	Greater Hume Shire Council	35°58′54″S 147°12′04″E
Currajong	Greater Hume Shire Council	35°50′54″S 147°38′04″E
Dora Dora	Greater Hume Shire Council	35°51′54″S 147°23′04″E
Forest Creek	Greater Hume Shire Council	35°34′54″S 147°30′04″E
Gerogery	Greater Hume Shire Council	35°52′24″S 147°01′04″E
Holbrook	Greater Hume Shire Council	35°42′54″S 147°20′04″E
Hume	Greater Hume Shire Council	35°52′54″S 147°15′04″E
Huon	Greater Hume Shire Council	35°52′54″S 146°55′04″E
Jergyle	Greater Hume Shire Council	35°48′54″S 147°23′04″E
Jerra Jerra	Greater Hume Shire Council	35°28′54″S 147°13′04″E
Jindera	Greater Hume Shire Council	35°57′54″S 146°55′04″E
Jingellic	Greater Hume Shire Council	35°54′54″S 147°39′04″E
Little Billabung	Greater Hume Shire Council	35°29′54″S 147°31′04″E
Mitchell	Greater Hume Shire Council	35°47′54″S 147°18′04″E
Mountain Creek	Greater Hume Shire Council	35°46′54″S 147°15′04″E
Mullengandra	Greater Hume Shire Council	35°53′54″S 147°11′04″E
Mungabarina	Greater Hume Shire Council	35°01′54″S 146°57′04″E
Murray	Greater Hume Shire Council	35°37′24″S 147°32′04″E
Narra Narra Wa	Greater Hume Shire Council	35°47′54″S 147°32′04″E
Pulletop	Greater Hume Shire Council	35°33′54″S 147°21′04″E
Talmalmo	Greater Hume Shire Council	35°51′54″S 147°33′04″E
Thurgoona	City of Albury	36°03′54″S 147°00′04″E
Vautier	Greater Hume Shire Council	35°51′54″S 147°30′04″E
Wagra	Greater Hume Shire Council	35°58′54″S 147°15′04″E
Woomargama	Greater Hume Shire Council	35°48′54″S 147°10′04″E
Wyndham	Greater Hume Shire Council	35°56′54″S 147°07′04″E
Yambla	Greater Hume Shire Council	35°55′54″S 147°01′04″E
Yarara	Greater Hume Shire Council	35°41′54″S 147°39′04″E
Yarra Yarra	Greater Hume Shire Council	35°42′54″S 147°27′04″E
