= Mullengandra, New South Wales =

Mullengandra
- Town
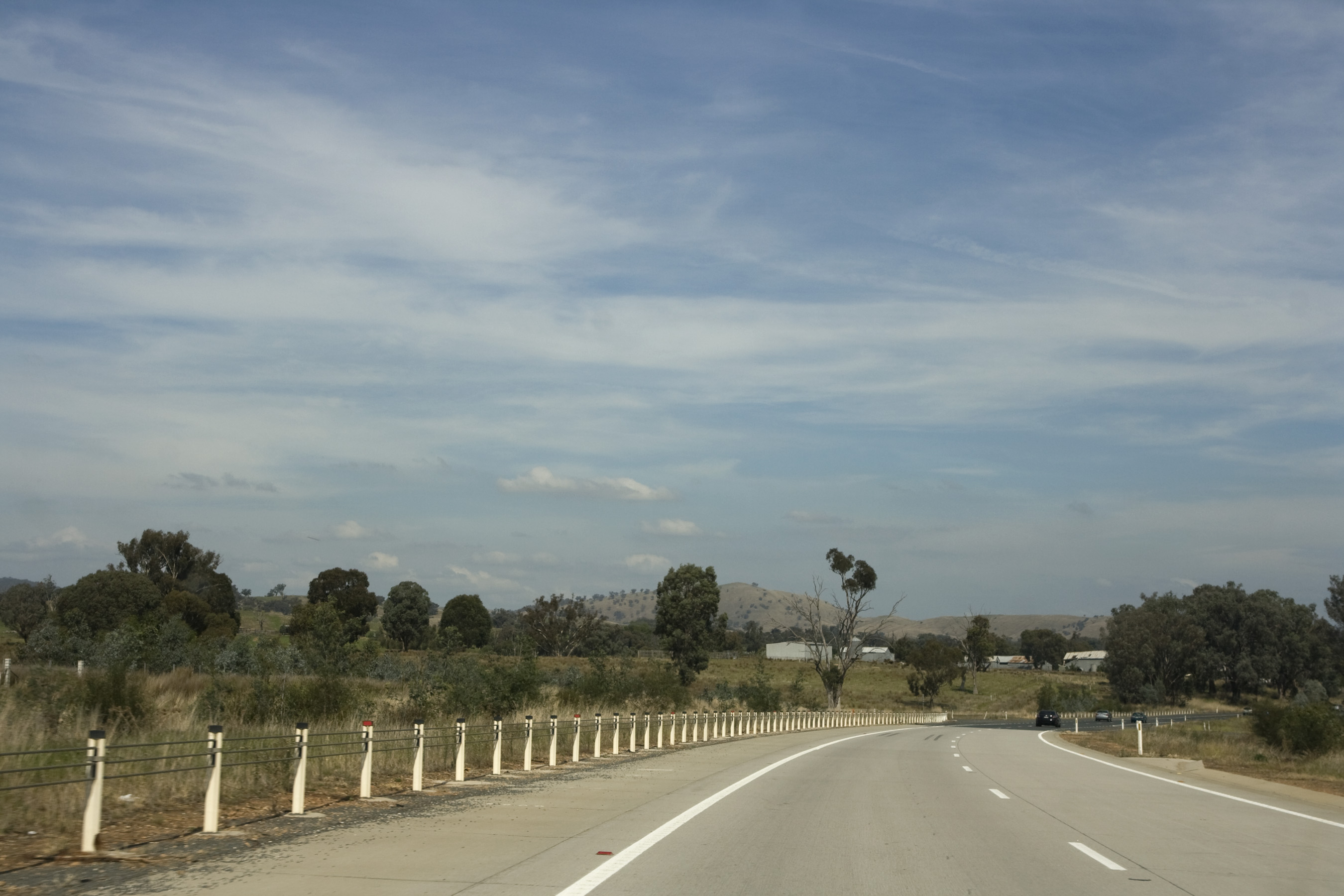

- Coordinates: 35°52′37″S 147°10′50″E
- Country: Australia
- State: New South Wales
- LGA: Greater Hume Shire Council
- Location: 7 km (4.3 mi) from Bowna; 8 km (5.0 mi) from Woomargama

Government
  - State electorate: Albury
  - Federal division: Farrer
- Elevation: 305 m (1,001 ft)

Population
  - Total: 122 (SAL 2021)
- Postcode: 2644
- County: Goulburn

Mullengandra is a village community in the south east part of the Riverina. It is situated by road, about 7 kilometres north east of Bowna and 8 kilometres south west of Woomargama. The town is on the Hume Highway north of Albury.

At the 2016 census the town had a population of 320, with an average income of $823.

== History ==
In the 1850s the town was troubled with Bushrangers.

A town was proclaimed in 1852, described at that time as 1½ square miles, within the County of Goulburn... bounded on the west by the Mullengandra Creek.

An Anglican Church was consecrated in 1876. Mullengandra Post Office opened on 16 May 1888.

The public school opened in 1871 and closed in 2017.

The town's churches and pub have also closed recently.
