= Animal Liberation Ltd v National Parks and Wildlife Service =

2003 NSW court case regarding the culling of feral animals

Animal Liberation Ltd v National Parks & Wildlife Service
- Court: Supreme Court of New South Wales
- Decided: 26 May 2003

Court membership
- Judge sitting: Hamilton J

Keywords
- Injunction

Animal Liberation Ltd v National Parks & Wildlife Service was a NSW Supreme Court case, and one of the first Australian court cases to provide judicial recognition of animal sentience.

== Background ==
Animal Liberation Ltd sought an interlocutory injunction to prevent the Director General of the National Parks & Wildlife Service from culling wild goats in the Woomargama National Park via a helicopter shoot, arguing that the practice constituted animal cruelty.

== Trial ==
Animal Liberation Ltd argued that the shooting would be comparable to the culling of feral goats that took place on Lord Howe Island in 1999. They introduced forensic pathology evidence from the 1999 culling, revealing that some animals were not killed right away and there was no evidence of coup de grace. The Director General refuted any connection whatsoever to the 1999 Lord Howe Island cull and also argued that cruelty could not be inferred. The Director General further contended that the court should not restrain a statutory agency from performing its duty unless unnecessary cruelty was involved.

=== Issues ===
The Court examined three primary issues: the involvement of the Director General in the Lord Howe Island cull, the potential risk of cruelty associated with the aerial cull, and the question of whether the Court should grant Animal Liberation the interlocutory injunction to prevent the aerial cull.

=== Judgment ===
Hamilton J found that even though the Lord Howe Island cull was conducted by the Lord Howe Island Board (and not the National Parks & Wildlife Service), the Director General had a representative on the Board and was consulted. The defendant addressed complaints and wrote letters on behalf of the Minister regarding the cull's satisfactoriness. His Honour inferred that the defendant believed in the correctness of these views as Director General.

Hamilton J noted the Director General's broad statement that the shoot would be conducted properly. However, his Honour remained unconvinced of this statement given that similar assurances were made for the Lord Howe Island cull in 1999. Therefore, Hamilton J did not consider the Director General's assurances as negating the risk of cruelty in the proposed shoot. Furthermore, it was arguable that certain animals would not be killed right away nor be swiftly put down after sustaining injuries.

=== Decision ===
Hamilton J issued a temporary injunction lasting four to six weeks, determining that the risk of animal cruelty resulting from an immediate cull was greater than any possible harm the Director General might incur.

== Significance ==
While the decision did not completely end aerial culling and only granted a temporary injunction for six weeks, it provided judicial recognition of animal sentience in culling feral animals.
