= Hume Highway =

Major national highway in Australia

Hume Highway Hume Freeway/Hume Motorway New South Wales–Victoria
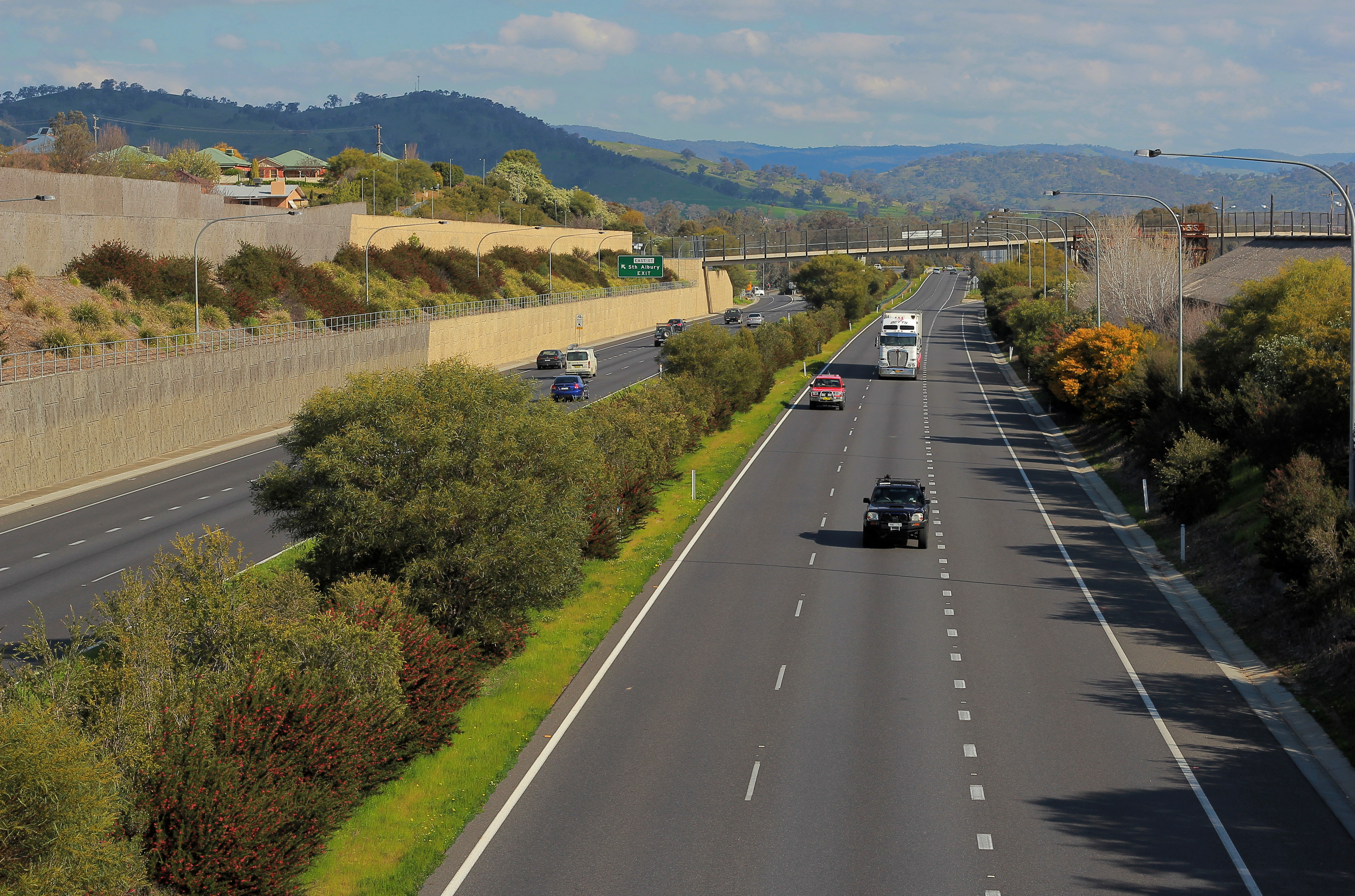
- M31 Hume Highway by-passing the Albury CBD, facing south (2015)

General information
- Type: Highway
- Length: 840 km (522 mi)
- Gazetted: September 1914 (VIC, as Main Road); July 1925 (VIC, as State Highway); August 1928 (NSW, as Main Road 2)
- Route number(s): (2013–present) (Ashfield–Warwick Farm); (2013–present) (Warwick Farm–Prestons); (2013–present) (Prestons, NSW–Campbellfield, VIC)
- Former route number: see Former route allocations

Major junctions
- Northeast end: Great Western Highway; Ashfield, Sydney
- Cumberland Highway; South Western Motorway; Westlink; Old Hume Highway; Illawarra Highway; Federal Highway; Barton Highway; Snowy Mountains Highway; Sturt Highway; Olympic Highway; Riverina Highway; Murray Valley Highway; Great Alpine Road; Midland Highway; Goulburn Valley Freeway; Goulburn Valley Highway; Northern Highway; Sydney Road
- Southwest end: Metropolitan Ring Road; Western Ring Road Thomastown, Melbourne

Location(s)
- Major settlements: Berrima, Goulburn, Yass, Gundagai, Albury–Wodonga, Wangaratta, Benalla, Seymour, Craigieburn

Highway system
- Highways in Australia; National Highway • Freeways in Australia; Highways in New South Wales; Highways in Victoria

The Hume Highway, including sections known as the Hume Freeway, the Hume Motorway and Liverpool Road, is one of Australia's major inter-city national highways, running for 840 kilometres (520 mi) between Melbourne in the southwest and Sydney in the northeast. Upgrading of the route from Sydney's outskirts to Melbourne's outskirts to dual carriageway was completed on 7 August 2013.

From north to south, the road is called the Hume Highway in metropolitan Sydney, the Hume Motorway between the Cutler Interchange and Berrima, the Hume Highway elsewhere in New South Wales and the Hume Freeway in Victoria. It is part of the Auslink National Network and is a vital link for road freight to transport goods to and from the two cities as well as serving Albury–Wodonga and Canberra. It is therefore considered to be Australia's longest highway in terms of its dual-carriageway standard retaining the M, or motorway, alphanumeric.

== Route ==
Distance signage in New South Wales

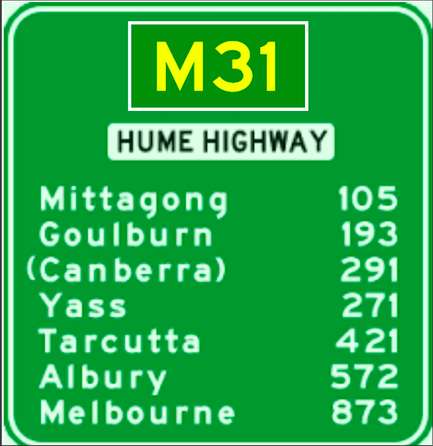
Distances to destinations through the Hume Highway heading southbound using the current M31 route number

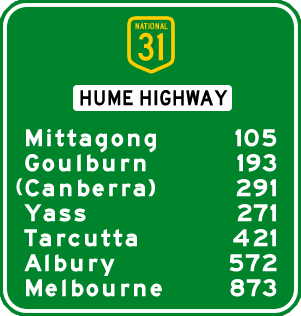
Distances to destinations along the highway from Sydney using the former National Highway 31 route marker (which was replaced by the M31 route number)

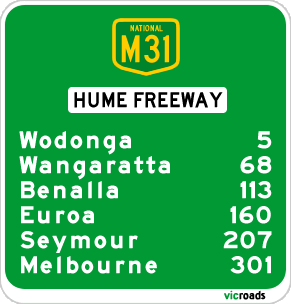
Approximate road distances (in kilometres) along the Hume Freeway southwards from the Victorian border. As of 2013, the National Highway sign is no longer in use by VicRoads, with only the M31 signage used. The previous style is still present in existing signs.

At its Sydney end, Hume Highway begins at Parramatta Road, in Ashfield, where it is dual named Liverpool Road until Greenacre. This route is numbered as A22. The Copeland Street section in Liverpool is also dual named alongside the Hume Highway. In August 1928 the Great Southern Road was gazetted as the Hume Highway as part of the creation of the NSW highway system.

The main Hume Highway/Motorway effectively commences at the junction of the M5 South West Motorway and the Westlink M7 at Prestons. Heading eastbound, the M5 provides access to Sydney Airport and the CBD; while the M7 provides access to Newcastle and Brisbane bypassing the Sydney CBD. Both of these routes are tolled. The section of Hume Motorway between Prestons and Narellan Road was previously known as South Western Freeway (not to be confused with the M5 South West Motorway) and was allocated route number F5. While this section later officially became known as Hume Highway, it continued to be referred to as the F5 Freeway until the early 2010s due to its renaming to M31 Hume Motorway in 2013.

Other than sections within the urban areas of Sydney and Melbourne, Hume Highway is generally dual-carriageway (with at-grade intersections and restricted entry from adjoining land), with considerable lengths which are of full freeway standard. Most of these sections are bypasses of the larger towns on the route, where the need to deviate the route to construct the bypass made it practical to deny access from adjoining land and thus provide full freeway conditions. In addition to these bypasses the sections between Casula (in southwestern Sydney) and Berrima (built 1973–92), and Broadford to Wallan (1976), which were both constructed as major deviations, are also of full freeway standard. The entire section in Victoria is categorised as a freeway by government roads authority VicRoads, although a few intersections along the route are not yet grade-separated. The speed limit on the full length of the highway is 110 km/h (68.4 mph).

As Hume Freeway approaches Melbourne at the suburb of Craigieburn, 27 kilometres (17 mi) north of the Melbourne central business district, the Craigieburn Bypass now diverts Hume Freeway (and the M31 designation) to the east of the former route, to terminate at the Western and Metropolitan Ring Roads. This bypass was opened in two stages, in December 2004 and December 2005.

At its Melbourne end, the original alignment of the Melbourne–Sydney route followed Royal Parade northward from where it begins at its intersection with Elizabeth Street and Flemington Road. Royal Parade becomes Sydney Road at Brunswick Road and then became the Hume Highway itself at Campbellfield. This ceased to be the designated route of Hume Highway in 1992, with the completion of Stage 1 of the Western Ring Road, at which point the designation of the southbound highway was truncated. The former highway south from the Western Ring Road to Elizabeth Street is route is now numbered as Metropolitan Route 55 and is now officially called Sydney Road.

=== Landscapes ===
Heading north from Melbourne, the road passes through the hills of the Great Dividing Range, some of which is covered with box eucalypt forest but most of which much is cleared for farmland, before levelling out near Seymour to cross flat, mostly cleared farming country to Wodonga and the Victoria–New South Wales border. Victoria's landscape differs from that of the typical 'true Australian Outback', but a dry summer can leave the ground parched. Mount Buffalo can be seen in the distance to the east as the highway comes down off the Warby Range near Glenrowan, and a museum commemorating Ned Kelly is located nearby. At Wangaratta the highway passes close to the Rutherglen and Milawa wine-producing areas.

Continuing north, the Murray River, the south bank of which is the Victoria–New South Wales border, is crossed on the bypass of Albury-Wodonga. From Albury, the highway skirts Lake Hume and continues across undulating country generally north-east towards Holbrook and then Tarcutta. Just north of Tarcutta the highway encounters the first of several ranges which form outliers of the Great Dividing Range, and which are crossed as the highway climbs the slopes to the tablelands west of Yass. From here the highway runs eastward, to Goulburn where it again turns northeast. Most of the New South Wales countryside from Albury to Marulan has been developed for wool production, with Yass and Goulburn in particular noted for their fine wool.

== History ==
The coast of New South Wales, from the Queensland to the Victorian borders, is separated from the inland by an escarpment, forming the eastern edge of the Great Dividing Range, with few easy routes up this escarpment. To climb from the coast to the tablelands, Hume Highway uses the Bargo Ramp, a geological feature which provides one of the few easy crossings of the escarpment.

In the first twenty years of European settlement at Sydney (established 1788), exploration southwest of Sydney was slow. This area was heavily wooded at the time, especially the Bargo brush, which was regarded as almost impenetrable. In 1798 explorers (Wilson, Price, Hacking and Collins) reached the Moss Vale and Marulan districts, but this was not followed up. Any settlement would have to await the construction of an adequate access track, which would have been beyond the colony's resources at the time, and would have served little purpose as a source of supplies for Sydney, due to the time taken to reach Sydney. In 1804, Charles Throsby penetrated through the Bargo brush to the country on the tablelands near Moss Vale and Sutton Forest. On another expedition in 1818, he reached Lake Bathurst and the Goulburn Plains. Many of the early explorers would most likely have used Aboriginal guides, but they do not appear to have given them credit.

After Charles Throsby's 1818 journey towards present day Goulburn, followed by Hamilton Hume and William Hovell's overland journey from Appin to Port Phillip and return in 1824, development of the Southern Tablelands for agriculture was rapid. The present route of Hume Highway is much the same as that used by the pioneers.

The route taken by Hume Highway to climb from the coast to the Southern Tablelands and across the Great Divide is situated between the parallel river gorge systems of the Wollondilly and Shoalhaven rivers. This country consists generally of a gently sloping plateau which is deeply dissected by the Nepean River and its tributaries. The route of the highway, by using four high-level bridges to cross these gorges, avoids the Razorback Range, and has minimal earthworks. The climb from the western side of the Nepean River at Menangle up to Mittagong is fairly sustained, a fact that is hard to appreciate at high speed on the modern freeway. The highway climbs non-stop over a distance of 16 kilometres (10 mi) from the Pheasants Nest Bridge over the Nepean River to Yerrinbool, before dropping slightly before the final climb to reach the tablelands at Aylmerton, a climb of over 430 metres (1,410 ft) in 25 kilometres (16 mi).

=== Early road construction ===
Governor Lachlan Macquarie ordered the construction of a road, which became known as the Great Southern Road (the basis of the northern end of Hume Highway) in 1819 from Picton to the Goulburn Plains and he travelled to Goulburn in 1820, but it is unlikely that even a primitive road was finished at that time.

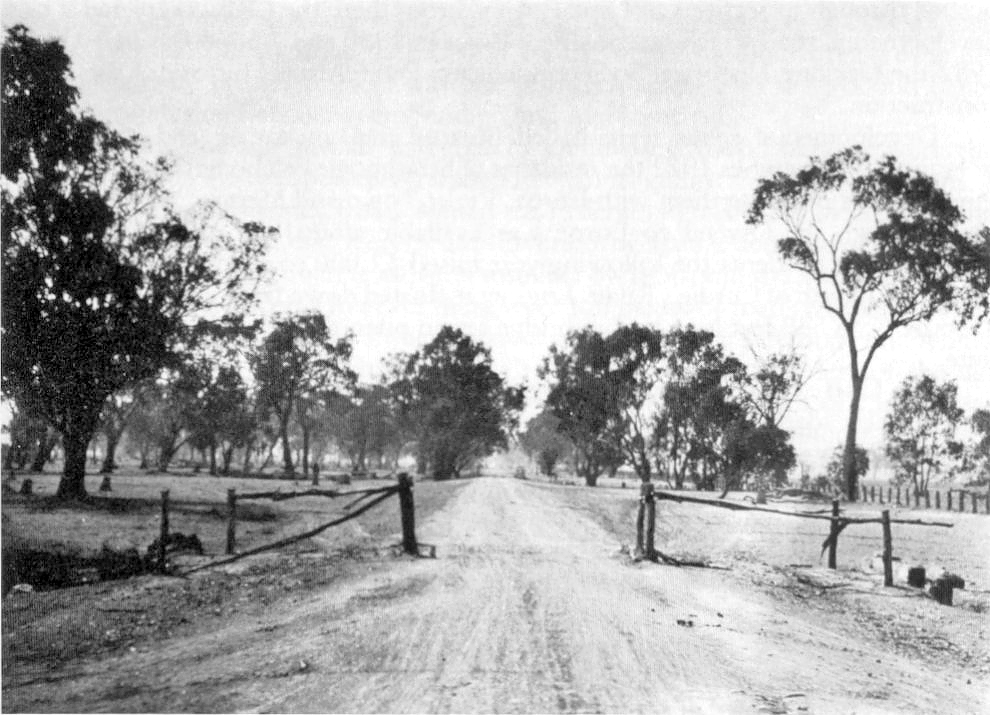
A passable section of "Sydney Road" in the shire of Benalla, 1914.

The Great South Road was rebuilt and completely re-routed between Yanderra and Goulburn by Surveyor-General Thomas Mitchell in 1833. The Main Roads Management Act of June 1858 declared the Great South Road, from near Sydney through Goulburn and Gundagai to Albury, as one of the three main roads in the colony. However, its southern reaches were described as only a "scarcely formed bullock track" as late as 1858. The road was improved in the mid-1860s with some sections near Gundagai "metalled" and all creeks bridged between Adelong Creek (approximately 10 kilometres south of Gundagai and now known as the village of Tumblong) and Albury.

Mitchell's route in New South Wales, except for the current-day bypasses at Mittagong, Berrima and Marulan (dual carriageways were completed in 1986), is still largely followed by today's highway. Mitchell intended to straighten the route north of Yanderra, but was not granted funding, although his proposed route through Pheasants Nest has similarities to the freeway route opened in 1980. Mitchell's work on the Great South Road is best preserved at Towrang Creek (10 kilometres north of Goulburn), where his stone arch culvert still stands, although it was superseded in 1965 by a concrete box culvert which in turn was superseded by the current route of the highway when it was duplicated in 1972.

By contrast, in Victoria there was an early and major change to Mitchell's route. Mitchell's original route between Albury and Melbourne went through Mitchellstown on the Goulburn River and took a long detour to the west of Mount Macedon.

In March 1837 Charles Bonney blazed a new trail from Mitchellstown through Kilmore to Melbourne, a route that took a day and a half off the previous journey. The bulk of Bonney's track formed the Sydney Road for the next 139 years. and was especially surveyed in 1840.

=== Road classification ===
In 1914, both the Victorian and NSW sections of the highway were declared main roads by their respective state road authorities.

Within Victoria, the passing of the Country Roads Act 1912 through the Parliament of Victoria provided for the establishment of the Country Roads Board and its ability to declare Main Roads, taking responsibility for the management, construction and care of the state's major roads from local municipalities. (Main) Sydney Road was declared a Main Road over a period of months, from 7 September 1914 (Baddaginnie through Benalla to Glenrowan), 5 October 1914 (Springhurst through Chiltern to Barnawartha), 16 November 1914 (through Craigieburn, Broadford and Euroa), to 30 November 1914 (from Craigieburn through Wallan and Kimore to Broadford, from Broadford through Seymour to Euroa, Euroa through Violet Town to Baddaginne, Glenrowan through Wangaratta to Springhurst, and finally Barnawartha through Wodonga to the state border with New South Wales). The passing of the Highways and Vehicles Act 1924 provided for the declaration of State Highways, roads two-thirds financed by the state government through the Country Roads Board. North-Eastern Highway was declared a State Highway on 1 July 1925, cobbled from a collection of roads from Melbourne through Seymour, Benalla, Wangaratta and Wodonga to the Murray River (for a total of 161 miles), subsuming the original declaration of Main Sydney Road as a Main Road.

Within New South Wales, the passing of the Main Roads Act 1924 through the Parliament of New South Wales provided for the declaration of Main Roads, roads partially funded by the State government through the Main Roads Board. Main Road No. 2 was declared along Great South Road on 8 August 1928, heading southwest from the intersection with Great Western Highway at Ashfield, through Bankstown, Liverpool, Crossroads, Narellan, Picton, Mittagong, Goulburn, Yass and Gundagai to Albury. With the passing of the Main Roads (Amendment) Act 1929 to provide for additional declarations of State Highways and Trunk Roads, this was amended to State Highway 2 on 8 April 1929.

The Great Southern Road through New South Wales, and North-Eastern Highway through Victoria, were renamed Hume Highway in 1928, after Hamilton Hume, the first European (with William Hovell) to traverse an overland route between Sydney and the Port Phillip District, in what later became the Colony of Victoria. The highway was fully sealed by 1940.

In New South Wales, the passing of the Roads Act 1993 through the Parliament of New South Wales updated road classifications and the way they could be declared within New South Wales. Under this act, Hume Highway today retains its declaration as Highway 2, from the intersection with Parramatta Road in Ashfield in Sydney, to the state border with Victoria.

In Victoria, the passing of the Road Management Act 2004 through the Parliament of Victoria granted the responsibility of overall management and development of Victoria's major arterial roads to VicRoads: VicRoads re-declared the road in 2013 as Hume Freeway (Freeway #1550), beginning at the state border with New South Wales to the intersection with Western and Metropolitan Ring Roads at Thomastown.

The route was allocated National Route 31 across its entire length in 1954. The Whitlam government introduced the federal National Roads Act 1974, where roads declared as a National Highway were still the responsibility of the states for road construction and maintenance, but were fully compensated by the Federal government for money spent on approved projects. As an important interstate link between the capitals of New South Wales and Victoria, Hume Highway was declared a National Highway in 1974, and was consequently re-allocated National Highway 31. At the Sydney end, as the South-Western Freeway was extended during the 1990s, National Highway 31 was replaced with Metroad 5 from Prestons to Liverpool in the early 1990s, then by Metroad 7 through Liverpool, and State Route 31 from Liverpool to its terminus at Ashfield. At the Melbourne end, route M31 was diverted onto the Craigieburn bypass in 2005; the former alignment (now known as Sydney Road) was replaced with State Route 55. With both states' conversion to the newer alphanumeric system between the late 1990s and the early 2010s, its route number was updated to route M31 for the highway within Victoria in 1997, and eventually within New South Wales in 2013 (with the route between Berrima and Prestons also renamed Hume Motorway), with route A28 between Prestons and Liverpool, and route A22 from Liverpool to its terminus at Ashfield.

=== Upgrades ===
==== New South Wales ====
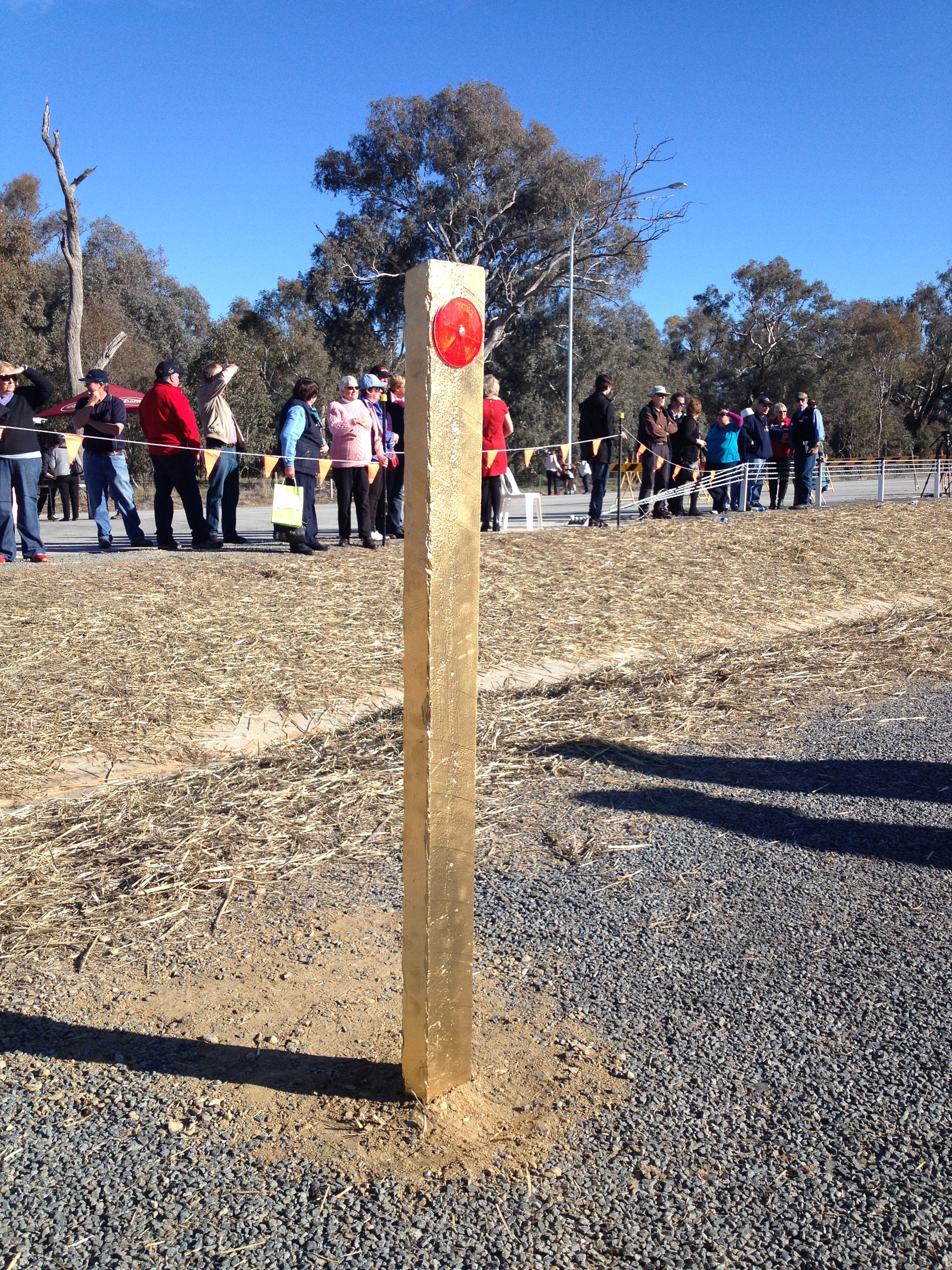
A Golden Guidepost on the Holbrook Bypass section of Hume Freeway. The guidepost symbolises the connection of Melbourne and Sydney by dual carriageway

In March 1967 the last single lane bridge on the highway, that carried it over the Bargo River and Main Southern railway line at Bargo, was replaced.

Between February 2009 and March 2012, both carriageways were widened between Brooks Road and Narellan Road. This work was undertaken in three stages. The first stage, widening to four lanes each way between Brooks Road and St Andrews Road St Andrews was completed in 2010. The second stage, widening to four lanes each way between St Andrews Road and Raby Road commenced in 2009 and was completed in mid-2011. The final stage, widening to three lanes each way between Raby Road and Narellan Road, commenced in September 2010 and was completed in March 2012. Construction of a pedestrian bridge over the highway to link Claymore and Woodbine was also completed. This section of the highway, opened as part of the two stages opened in October 1973 and December 1974, was originally designed for widening of the carriageways to three lanes.

Work commenced in 2010 on a 9.5 km (5.9 mi) bypass of Holbrook. The bypass was opened to traffic on 7 August 2013 after being postponed due to wet weather. The opening of the bypass resulted in dual carriageway (much to freeway standard) over the full length of the highway for the first time. In 2019, the distinctive Meccano Set steel gantry carrying overhead directional signs and traffic signals at the intersection of the Hume Highway, Woodville Road and Henry Lawson Drive in Lansdowne was replaced with a near-identical replica after public consultation favoured retaining the landmark.

==== Victoria ====
In 2008, VicRoads undertook a planning study for the upgrading of Hume Freeway by removal of direct access from adjoining properties and grade-separation of the intersections between Kalkallo and Beveridge. These intersections had the highest accident rate of the Hume Freeway in Victoria. The study, completed in March 2009, ensured council planning schemes were amended so as to reserve space for the upgrade, but no timetable had been set for the project.

In addition a 4-level interchange between Hume Freeway and the proposed Outer Metropolitan Ring Road is slated to start construction in the 2030s.

==== Timeline of duplication and bypass works ====
Duplication works on the highway began in the 1960s and concluded in 2013. The entire route between Sydney and Melbourne is now a dual carriageway, limited access highway.

- 1962 – Chiltern to Barnawartha opened January, 1962. This is referred to as the 'Hume By-pass Road'. Although initially opened as a single carriageway, two lane bypass, it was the first rural bypass of Victorian towns – Chiltern and Barnawartha – on Hume Highway and was designed to allow for the future construction of a second carriageway.
- 1962 – Craigieburn 'Hume By-pass Road', a dual-carriageway bypass over the North East railway line and Craigieburn Road, opened January 1962 at a cost of £388,000, superseded by Craigieburn bypass in 2005.
- 1965/66 – Broadford to Tallarook, duplication of 4 miles completed during the financial year.
- 1966 – 1.6 km of dual carriageway opened over Bendooley Hill between Mittagong and Berrima, superseded by Berrima bypass in 1989.
- 1966/67 – Craigieburn to Kalkallo, 4.4 miles of dual carriageways completed during the financial year.
- 1966/67 – Tallarook, 1.4 miles completed south of Tallarook and 1.3 miles completed north of Tallarook during the financial year.
- 1967/68 – Kalkallo to Beveridge, 4.1 miles of dual carriageways completed during the financial year.
- 1969/70 – Beveridge, Completion of 11 miles of dual carriageway during the financial year, including a deviation at Beveridge and continuation south to connect with existing dual carriageways north of Craigieburn.
- 1970/71 – Tallarook bypass, 4.5 mile bypass of Tallarook opened during the financial year.
- 1973 – Camden bypass stage 1, Macarthur Bridge across the Nepean River floodplain, opened.
- 1973 – South Western Expressway first section (9.8 km) (later subsumed into Hume Highway), opened from Hume Highway in Cross Roads to Campbelltown Road in Raby, on 26 October.
- 1974 – Camden bypass stage 2, new dual carriageway route from Narellan Road in Macarthur to Macarthur Bridge, opened.
- 1974 – South Western Expressway second section (5.8 km) (also later subsumed into Hume Highway), opened from Campbelltown Road in Raby to Narellan Road in Macarthur, on 16 December.
- 1976 – Kilmore bypass, new dual carriageway route from Wallan to Broadford, opened 3 May 1976, by Premier of Victoria Rupert Hamer. At that time it was the longest section of freeway ever opened at one time in Victoria (34 km) and was the 'single biggest construction project carried out by the Country Roads Board since its inception in 1913'.
- 1977 – new route of Hume Highway, built to freeway standard, opened from Yanderra to Aylmerton (13.5 km) on 24 May.
- 1979 – Violet Town to Baddaginnie, 10 km of dual carriageways opened early 1979, at a cost of $5.1mil.
- 1979 – Avenel to Tubbs Hill (near Longwood), 14.5 km duplication opened 19 December 1979, by Minister for Transport, Rob Maclellan, at a cost of $6.5mil.
- 1980 – Violet Town bypass, 12 km from Wibrahams Road to the existing freeway at One Mile Creek, opened 21 March 1980, by Minister for Transport, the Robert Maclellan, at a cost of $11mil.
- 1980 – 35 km deviation of Hume Highway bypassing the Razorback Range opened on 15 December from Narellan Road in Macarthur to Yanderra, connecting sections opened December 1974 and May 1977.
- 1981 – Avenel bypass, 16 km north-east from Goulburn Valley Highway interchange, opened 1 December 1981, by Minister for Transport, Robert Maclellan, at a cost of $25mil.
- 1982 – Seymour bypass, 9 km section, opened 14 December 1982, by Minister for Transport, Steve Crabb, at a cost of $26mil. At this stage, although largely opened to traffic, a one kilometre section of south bound carriageway south of Seymour was still under construction.
- 1984 – Longwood section, 10 km from Oxenburys Road to Creighton Road, opened by Assistant Minister of Transport, Jack Simpson, on 18 May 1984, at a cost of $10mil. The opening marked the halfway point for the duplication of the highway within Victoria, with the total length of dual carriageways at that point measuring 151 km.
- 1985 – Barnawartha to Wodonga duplication, from Hanson Road to Parkers Road. An initial 4 km of the 12.6 km duplicate carriageway was completed in 1985.
- 1986 – Marulan bypass, 7.3 km section opened 27 November 1986.
- 1987 – Benalla bypass, 36.5 km section, opened March 1987, at a cost of $70mil. The bypass was at this time the longest stretch of highway duplication opened at once in Victoria, and extended from south of Baddaginnie to Chivers Road, south of Glenrowan.
- 1987 – A new grade-separated interchange with the Illawarra Highway.
- 1987/88 – Barnawartha to Wodonga, from Hanson Road to Parkers Road. The remaining 8.6 km of the 12.6 km duplicate carriageway was expected to be open to traffic in 'the second half of 1987'.
- 1987/88 – Chiltern to Barnawartha. 21 km duplication from Gilmours Road to Hanson Road was expected to be 'opened to traffic in stages from July 1987 until late 1989', at a cost of $31mil.
- 1988/89 – Glenrowan bypass, 12.5 km section, completed during the financial year, at a cost of $31.5mil.
- 1989 – Berrima bypass, 15.5 km-long section, completed 22 March 1989, at a cost of $80ilm.
- 1990 – Springhurst to Chiltern, 5.2 km duplication, opened to traffic in March 1990, at a cost of $8.5mil.
- 1990 – Euroa to Balmattum, 8 km duplication, opened to traffic in June 1990, at a cost of $16mil.
- 1990 – Barnawartha bypass, 3.3 km section, completed in June 1990, at a cost of $11mil.
- 1991 – 3.3 km duplication north of Springhurst completed in November 1991.
- 1991 – 10 km duplication from Coppabella Road to Reedy Creek completed 17 December 1991.
- 1992 – Euroa bypass, completed 3 April 1992, at a cost of $43mil ($2mil under budget).
- 1992 – Mittagong bypass, 8.2 km section, completed 17 August 1992, at a cost of $83mil (originally part of the 1970s/1980s F5 project).
- 1992 – Goulburn bypass, 13 km section, completed 5 December 1992, at a cost of $84mil.
- 1993 – Cullerin Range deviation, 34 km section, completed 5 April 1993, at a cost of $132mil.
- 1994 – Springhurst bypass, 5 km section, completed March 1994, at a cost of $7.7mil.
- 1994 – Wangaratta bypass, 20 km section, completed April 1994, at a cost of $80mil (eight months ahead of schedule and $30m under budget); this was the final section of Hume Highway within Victoria to be duplicated.
- 1994 – Yass bypass, 18 km section, completed 25 July 1994, at a total cost of $106mil.
- 1995 – Cullerin to Yass duplication, first 11 km section completed 14 September 1994, second 6 km section completed 3 May 1995, at a total cost of $59.1mil.
- 1995 – Jugiong bypass, 13 km section, completed 11 October 1995, at a total cost of $85.5mil.
- 1996 – Tarcutta Range deviation, 9.4 km section upgrade south of Tumblong completed 3 May 1996, at a cost of $52.6mil.
- 2004 – Craigieburn bypass first section, between the Metropolitan Ring Road and Cooper Street, completed December 2004.
- 2005 – Craigieburn bypass second section, between Cooper Street and Craigieburn, completed December 2005, completing the 17 km bypass, at a total cost of $305mil.
- 2007 – Albury–Wodonga bypass, 14.6 km section, completed 6 March 2007; the NSW section comprised from Ettamogah to the Murray River through the city of Albury. The Australian Government fully funded the $374 million NSW section of the project. The $150m Victorian section was largely funded by the federal government, with the $5.8m Bandiana Link funded by the State Government of Victoria.
- 2009 – Southern Hume Highway duplication, Work began in October 2007 and the 65 km section (2 km shorter than the previous highway route) was progressively opened to traffic from mid 2009 and completed in December 2009. Completion of this section left only 21 km of the Hume Highway as single carriageway, through the towns of Tarcutta, Holbrook and Woomargama.

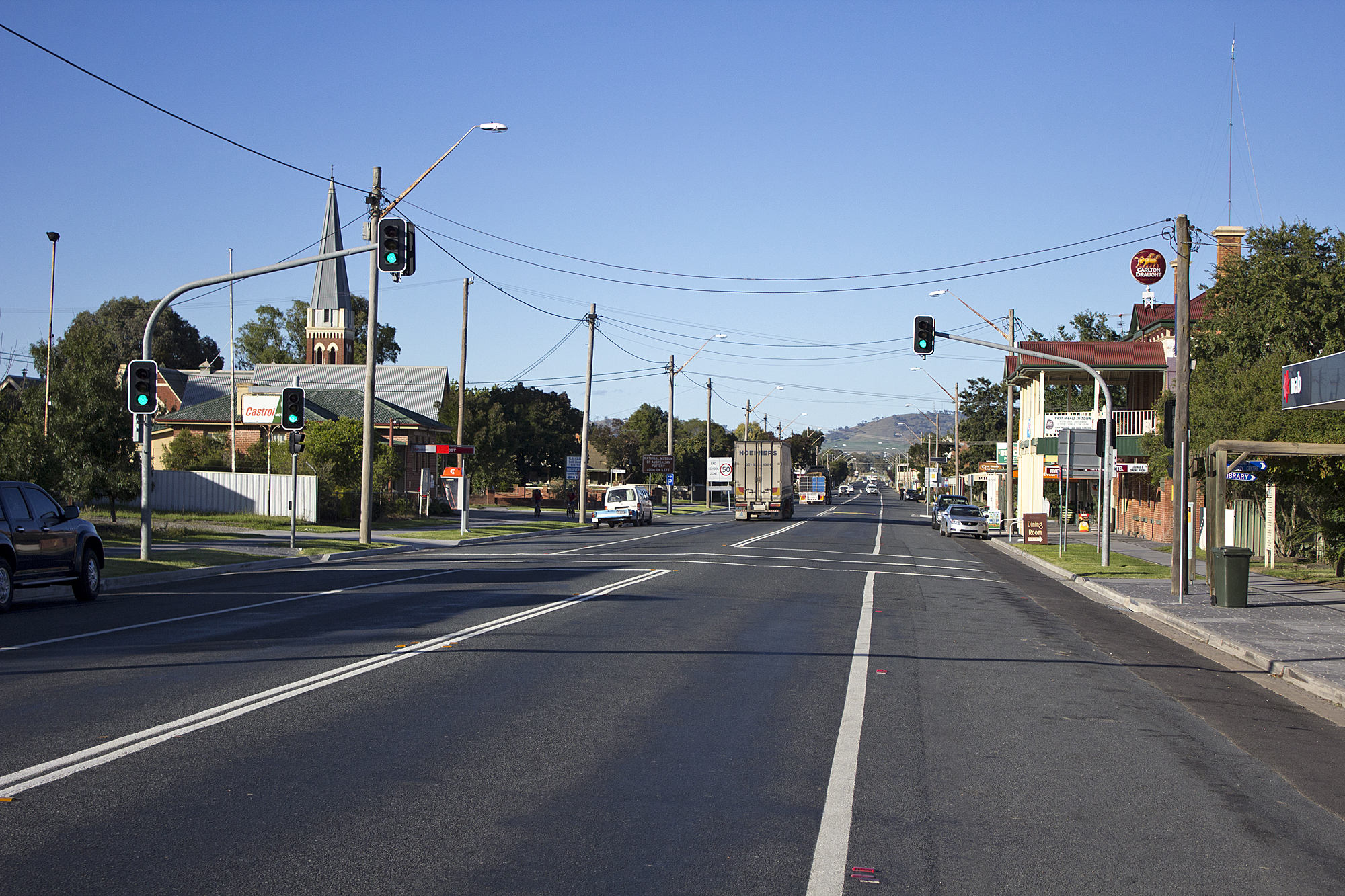
Hume Highway as it passes through Holbrook, the final town on the highway bypassed

- 2009 – Coolac bypass, 12 km section, completed August 2009, funded by the Australian Government at a cost of $171mil.
- 2009 – Sheahan Bridge duplication, Gundagai: traffic was switched to the new bridge in May 2009 to enable essential maintenance on existing bridge, both bridges available to traffic as dual carriageways in December 2009, funded by the Australian Government at a cost of $70.6mil.
- 2011 – Woomargama bypass, 9 km section, completed 7 November 2011, funded by the Australian Government at a cost of $265mil.
- 2011 – Tarcutta bypass, 7 km section, completed 15 November 2011, funded by the Australian Government at a cost of $290mil.
- 2013 – Holbrook bypass. In June 2013, the NSW department of Roads & Maritime Services celebrated the imminent completion of the duplication of the Hume Highway with a community day at the Holbrook Bypass.

=== Fixed speed camera locations ===
In April 2007, 'point-to-point' fixed speed-camera sites were installed, in the median strip along the Craigieburn Bypass section and northward to Broadford, in Victoria, at roughly 15–20 km intervals. These measure both instantaneous (flash photography) speed and its speciality in the point-to-point versions (between two or more sites and then the average speed is measured to the fixed speed limit, comparing how long it takes a vehicle to reach one point from another). There are five sites, with two cameras (radar version) at each, totalling ten altogether.
In Sydney: next to Ashfield Primary School, near Culdees Road Burwood, Willee St Enfield, Stacey St Bankstown, Brennan St Yagoona, and Knight St Lansvale.

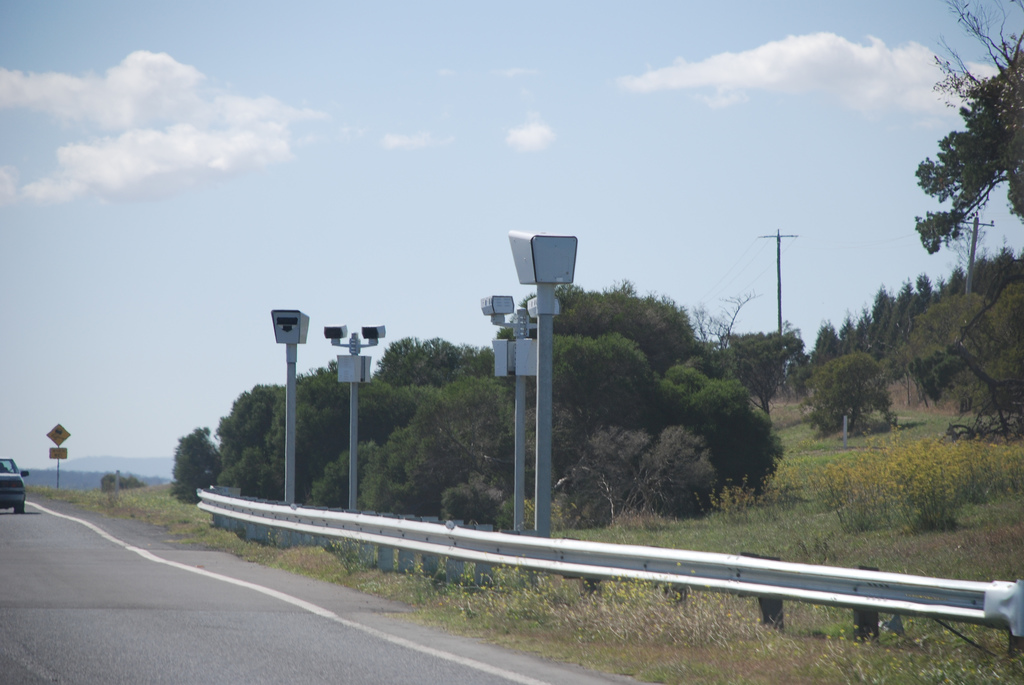
Point-to-point speed camera on Hume Highway in Victoria

=== Exit numbering trial ===
Between Prestons and Campbelltown, an exit numbering system was trialled from May 2016.

=== Former route allocations ===
Hume Highway has many former route allocations including former National Route 31. Where and when the former route numbers were implemented are stated below.

Ashfield – Chullora:

- National Route 31 (1954–1994)
- Metroad 5 (1994–2001)
- State Route 31 (2001–2013)
- A22 (2013–present)

Chullora – Warwick Farm:

- National Route 31 (1954–1994)
- State Route 31 (1994–2013)
- A22 (2013–present)

Warwick Farm – Casula:

- National Route 31 (1954–1974)
- National Highway 31 (1974–1993)
- Metroad 7 (1993–2005)
- unallocated: (2005–2013)
- A28 (2013–present)

Casula – Prestons:

- National Route 31 (1954–1974)
- National Highway 31 (1974–1992/93)
- Metroad 5 (1993–1994)
- Metroad 7 (1994–2005)
- unallocated: (2005–2013)
- A28 (2013–present)

Prestons – Campbelltown:

- National Route 31 (1954–1974)
- National Highway 31 (1974–1998)
- Metroad 5 (1998–2013)
- M31 (2013–present)

Campbelltown – Ettamogah:

- National Route 31 (1954–1974)
- National Highway 31 (1974–2013)
- M31 (2013–present)

Ettamogah – NSW/VIC border:

- National Route 31 (1954–1974)
- National Highway 31 (1974–2007)
- A31 (de facto) (2007–2013)
- M31 (2013–present)

NSW/VIC border – Campbellfield:

- National Route 31 (1954–1974)
- National Highway 31 (1974–1997)
- National Highway M31 (1997–2013, de facto 2013–present)
- M31 (2013–present)

== Exits and major interchanges ==
Hume Highway exits and major intersections are spread across 840 kilometres (520 mi) in the Australian states of New South Wales and Victoria. The highway's national route is divided into four sections comprising, from north to south, urban stretches of the highway in Sydney, a motorway from the outskirts of Sydney to the Southern Highlands, a grade-separated highway in regional New South Wales and across the state border, and a freeway throughout regional Victoria and into the outer suburbs of northern Melbourne.

In Sydney, Hume Highway stretches 31 kilometres (19 mi) southwest from Ashfield in the Inner West to Prestons via Enfield, Greenacre, Villawood, Liverpool and Casula. From Sydney's southwestern outskirts; Hume Motorway stretches 88 kilometres (55 mi) south by southwest, from Prestons to outside Berrima bypassing Campbelltown, Camden, Mittagong, Bowral and Moss Vale. From outside Berrima, Hume Highway stretches 426 kilometres (265 mi) southwest by west, bypassing Sutton Forest, Marulan, Goulburn, Yass, Bowning, Bookham, Jugiong, Gundagai, Holbrook, Thurgoona, Lavington and Albury before crossing the Murray River and entering Victoria. From this point Hume Freeway continues 295 kilometres (183 mi) southwest by south, bypassing Wodonga, Chiltern, Wangaratta, Benalla, Seymour, Broadford, Beveridge, Craigieburn and terminating at Thomastown.

From northeast to southwest, termini, major exits and interchanges occur with the Great Western Highway / Parramatta Road (A22), A3 (A3), A6 (A6), Henry Lawson Drive, Cumberland Highway (A28), M5 Motorway (M5), Westlink M7 (M7), Camden Valley Way (A28), A9 (A9), Remembrance Drive, Old Hume Highway (B73), Illawarra Highway (A48), Federal Highway (M23), Yass Valley Way, Barton Highway (A25), Lachlan Valley Way (B81), Burley Griffin Way (B94), Snowy Mountains Highway (B72), Sturt Highway (A20), Olympic Highway (A41), Riverina Highway (B58), Murray Valley Highway (B400), Great Alpine Road (B500), Midland Highway (A300/B300), Goulburn Valley Freeway (M39), Goulburn Valley Highway (B340), Northern Highway (B75), Sydney Road (SR55), and Western and Metropolitan Ring Roads (M80).

Major river crossings, from northeast to southwest, are the Nepean (three times), Wingecarribee, Paddys, Murrumbidgee, Murray, Ovens, King and Goulburn rivers. The Hume also crosses the Prospect, Jugiong, and Tarcutta creeks.

== Towns ==
=== Camden ===
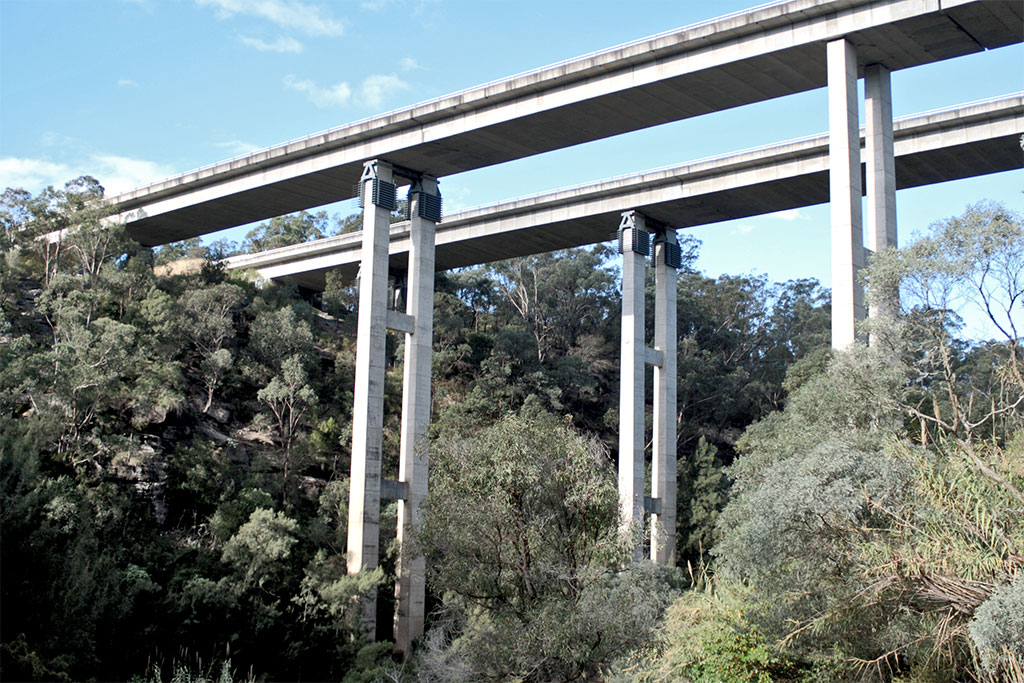
Hume Highway at Douglas Park near Picton

Camden dates from 1840 and lies 60 kilometres (37 mi) south west of Sydney on the Nepean River. It retains a rural character and has many historic buildings. There is an aviation museum at nearby Narellan. Urban sprawl has made Camden part of the Sydney metropolitan area.

Before the early 1970s, the Hume Highway ran west from the Cross Roads in Casula, 6 km south of Liverpool to western Edmondson Park, near the Forest Lawn Memorial Park, where it turned and followed the route of what is now Camden Valley Way. It ran through Narellan town centre before crossing the Nepean River on the Cowpasture Bridge. It ran through Camden town centre on Argyle Street before turning onto Murray Street, which then becomes Broughton Street. It then ran over the Razorback Range and through Picton, Tahmoor, Bargo, and Yanderra, where the modern Hume Highway reunites.

In 1973, the first stage of the South Western Freeway opened between the Hume Highway in Cross Roads and Campbelltown Road in Raby; in the same year, the first stage of the Camden Bypass opened from MacArthur Road in Elderslie to the Old Hume Highway/Broughton Street in South Camden, which included a bridge over the Nepean River floodplain. In 1974, the South Western Freeway was extended to Narellan Road in Campbelltown; in the same year, Stage 2 of the Camden Bypass opened, linking MacArthur Road and Narellan Road in Narellan, just east of its junction with Camden Valley Way (the original Hume Highway). This routed Hume Highway traffic, from Cross Roads on the South Western Freeway to Narellan Road, then along Narellan Road to the Camden Bypass, then over the Camden Bypass to rejoin the Hume Highway in South Camden to continue its journey to Yanderra. The Camden Bypass was superseded in 1980 with the extension of the South Western Freeway from Campbelltown to Yanderra to connect with the Yanderra-Aylmerton freeway section opened in 1977. This extension bypassed Camden, the Razorback Range, Picton, Tahmoor, and Bargo.

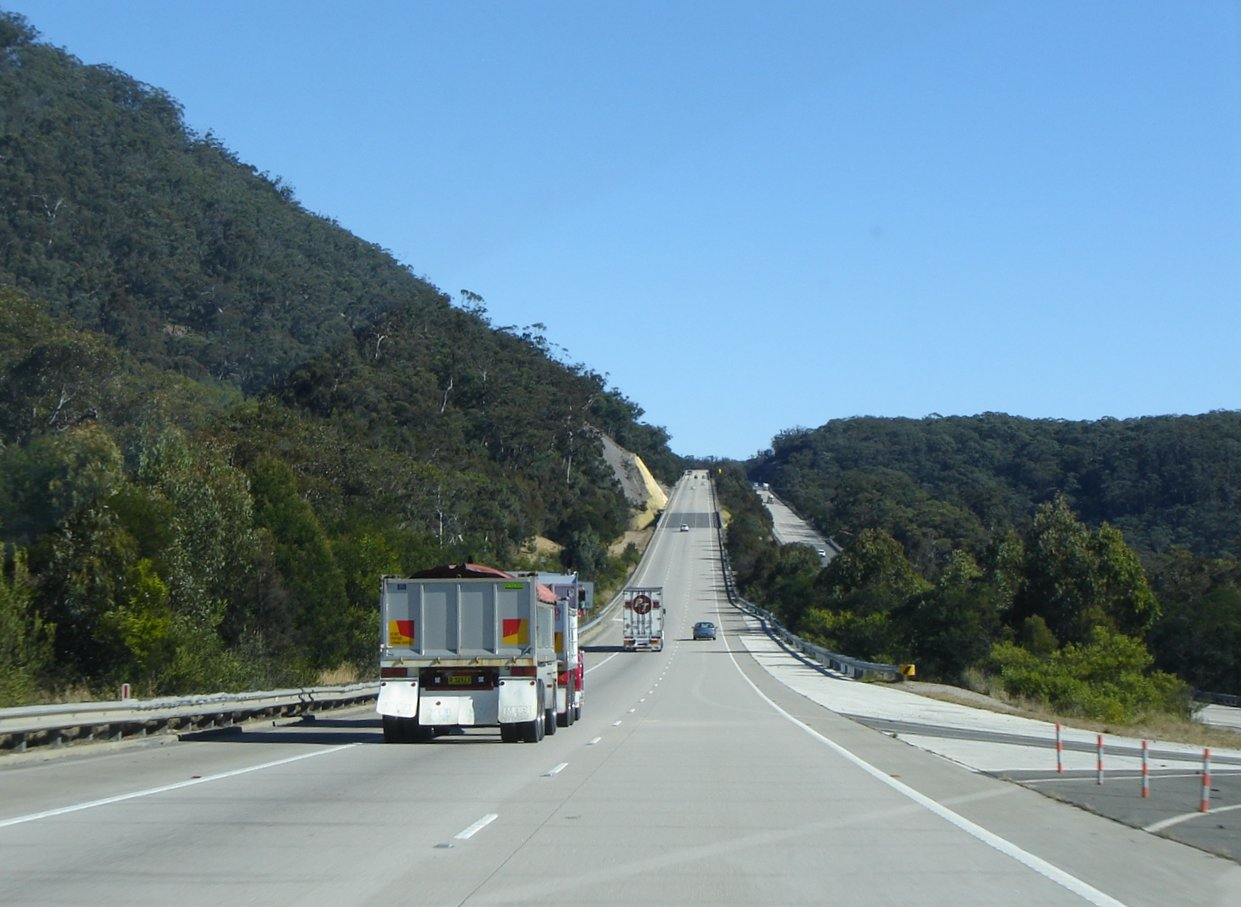
Hume Highway through Southern Highlands

An alternative route to the highway runs from Aylmerton through Mittagong and Bowral to join Illawarra Highway at Moss Vale and then follows Illawarra Highway through Sutton Forest to rejoin Hume Highway at Hoddles Crossroads (named after Surveyor Robert Hoddle who also laid out the Melbourne CBD).

=== Mittagong ===
Mittagong lies 110 kilometres (68 mi) south-west of Sydney, just off Hume Highway at the edge of the Southern Tablelands. Mittagong is also a part of the Southern Highlands region. It is notable for being the location of Australia's first ironworks. Mittagong's streets are lined with various species of deciduous trees and it has a busy town centre.

Until August 1992 when the Mittagong bypass was opened, the town was dominated by trucks and in winter it was also busy with skiers' traffic on the way to the Australian Alps. Today, Hume Highway bypasses Mittagong and all the towns of the Southern Tablelands. In the late 1990s, engineers detected subsidence under part of the bypass where it runs along a steep slope near the Nattai River. This was caused by features of the local geology, and mining activity at the adjacent Mount Alexandra coalmine from the 1950s to the 1970s. The problem was remedied by closing one carriageway at a time and building a pair of 'land bridges' across the unstable section of the slope.

=== Moss Vale ===
Moss Vale has buildings and Leighton Gardens, and in the centre of the main street, is a park. It is best during spring when its flowers are in blossom or in autumn when the leaves of its deciduous trees are changing colour. Sutton Forest is surrounded by farms, vineyards and is home to country homes and estates. It has a church, an inn, a couple of restaurants and one or two specialty shops.

=== Berrima ===
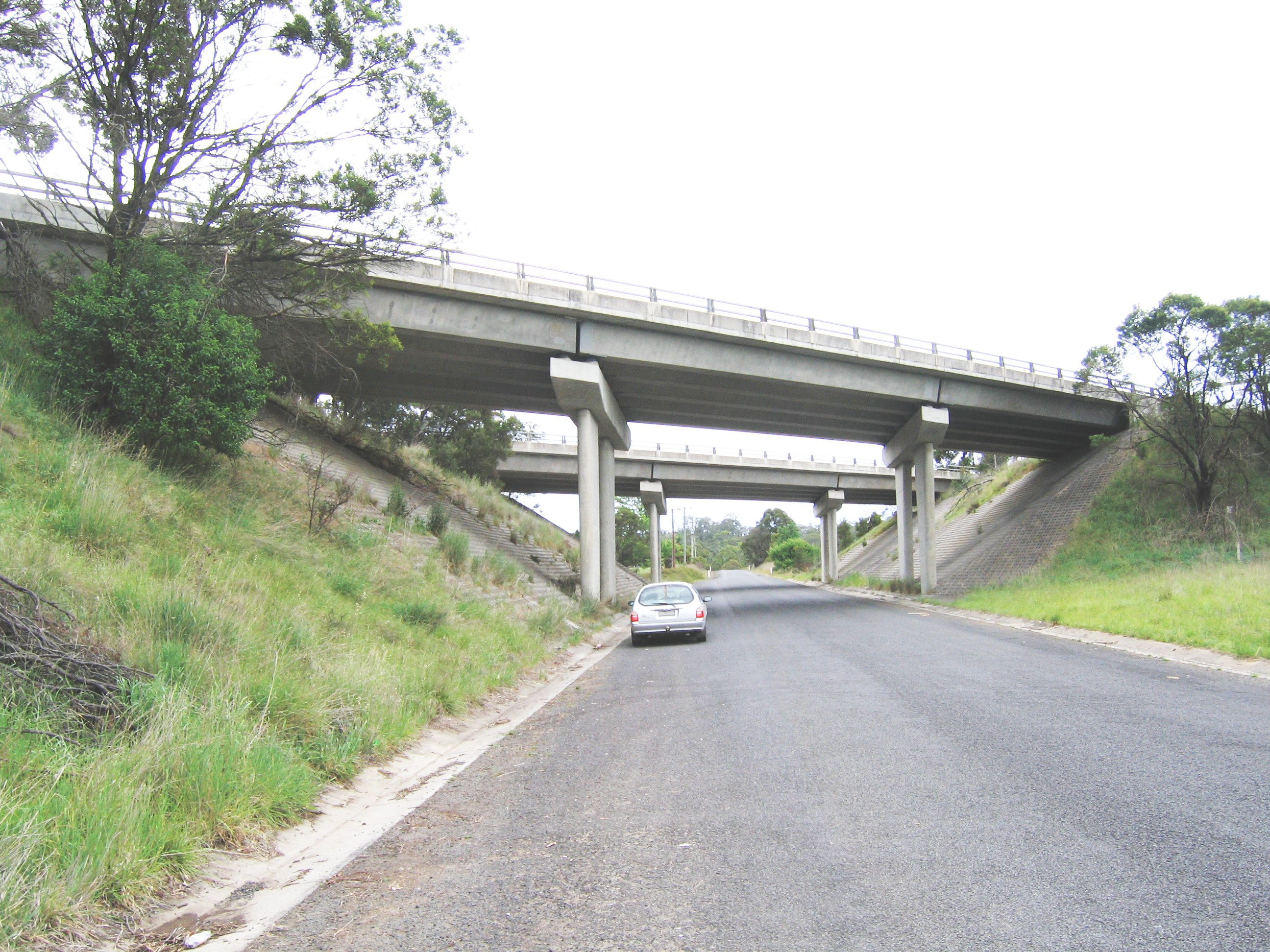
Twin bridges carrying Hume Highway over Greenhills Road north of Berrima 34°28′S 150°21′E

Berrima has flourished since it was bypassed in March 1989, with tourists finding it an easy day trip from either Sydney or Canberra to enjoy the town square and the Georgian architecture of this historic town. Berrima is the last Southern Highlands town that the Hume Highway passes.

=== Marulan ===
The Marulan bypass was opened in 1986. The southern part of Governor Lachlan Macquarie's road of 1819 ran from Sutton Forest roughly along existing minor roads through what is now Penrose State Forest to Canyonleigh, Brayton, Carrick and Towrang, where it joined the current route to Goulburn. Branching from this route (now part of the Illawarra Highway) just west of Sutton Forest, a road, now known as Old Argyle Road, developed in the 1820s. It ran to Bungonia, via Wingello, Tallong, and the southern outskirts of Marulan. Marulan lies on the 150th meridian east.

When Thomas Mitchell rerouted the Great South Road in the 1830s, he decided to bring these two roads together to meet at old Marulan, with roads proceeding west to Goulburn and south to Bungonia. When the railway reached Marulan in 1868, the town migrated 3 km north to the railway station. Nevertheless, the old cemetery remains at the Bungonia Road intersection. A quarry is about to be developed near the intersection, so an interchange has been built. It is at this point that the highway climbs the Marulan Ramp, which is part of the divide between the Shoalhaven and Wollondilly River systems.

=== Towrang Stockade ===
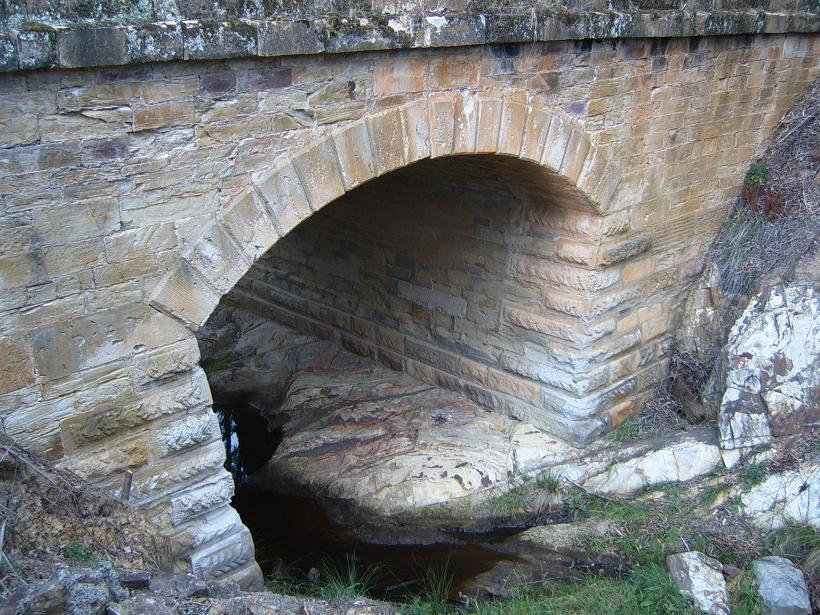
Towrang bridge of 1839

Towrang Creek was the site of a major stockade for chain-bound convicts and others involved in the construction of the Great South Road. The stockade was located on the western side of the highway and was used from around 1836 to 1842. The stockade became the principal penal establishment in the southern district and was noted for its harsh discipline. There were usually at least 250 convicts stationed there. They slept on bare boards with a blanket apiece, 10 men to a box or cell. One of the two official floggers was later found murdered. The stockade used to be accessible by a stile, but this has been taken down to discourage use of the once daunting intersection of the Highway with Towrang Road. There are the remains of the powder magazine next to the Wollondilly River, three graves on the north bank of Towrang Creek, and the remains of a weir on Towrang Creek built for the stockade. Aboriginal stone tools have also been found on the banks of Towrang Creek, indicating that this was a route well-travelled long before Hamilton Hume came this way in 1824.

There is also a rest area on the eastern side of the highway, where a well-preserved bridge dating from 1839 (possibly designed by David Lennox) and a 1960s concrete box culvert can be viewed.

=== Goulburn ===
After the cities of Liverpool and Campbelltown, Goulburn is the first major rural city along Hume Highway from Sydney. It is the centre of a rich agricultural area specialising in fine wool production. From this area comes some of the world's finest wool. Therefore, the city has a monument called The Big Merino near the service station. Goulburn was bypassed on 5 December 1992 and the main street (Auburn Street) is quieter, but still busy during Saturday morning shopping. Picturesque Belmore Park is located midway along Auburn Street. A number of architecturally and historically significant buildings are located near Belmore Park, including the courthouse, the post office and the railway station. Also in central Goulburn are two cathedrals, both of architectural note. A number of old houses and hotels are located near the railway station on Sloane Street.

=== Gunning ===
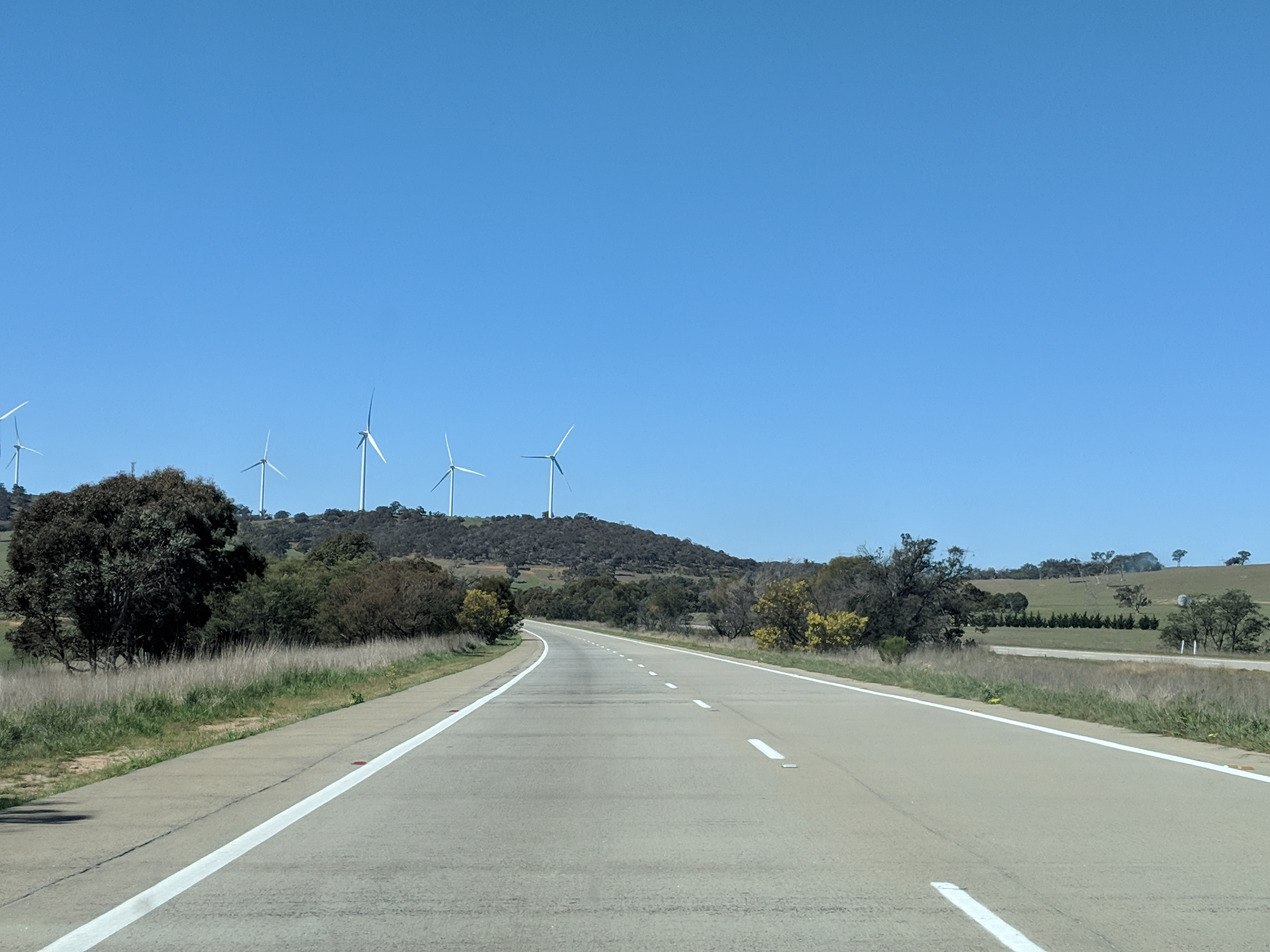
Hume Highway near Gunning

Gunning's 19th century main street was built very wide, for the time of horse and bullock-drawn wagons. This served the town well when the main highway between Sydney and Melbourne carried cars and trucks through the town. This ceased when the bypass was completed on 5 April 1993. The town is now much quieter, and it has been able to resume a more rural pace of life. It has developed something of an industry in providing bed and breakfast accommodation. The recently built Gunning Wind Farm is located beside the highway, with its wind turbines providing a distinctive landmark.

The former route of the highway which passed over the Cullerin Ranges is still in use between Bredalbane and Gunning, now known as Cullerin Road.

=== Yass ===
Yass has an historic main street, with well-preserved 19th century verandah-post pubs (mostly converted to other uses). It is popular with tourists, some from Canberra and others taking a break from the highway. Hamilton Hume's farm Cooma Cottage is located east of Yass, close to the intersection of the former routes of the Hume and Barton Highways. He lived there until his death in 1873. The Yass Bypass opened on 25 July 1994.

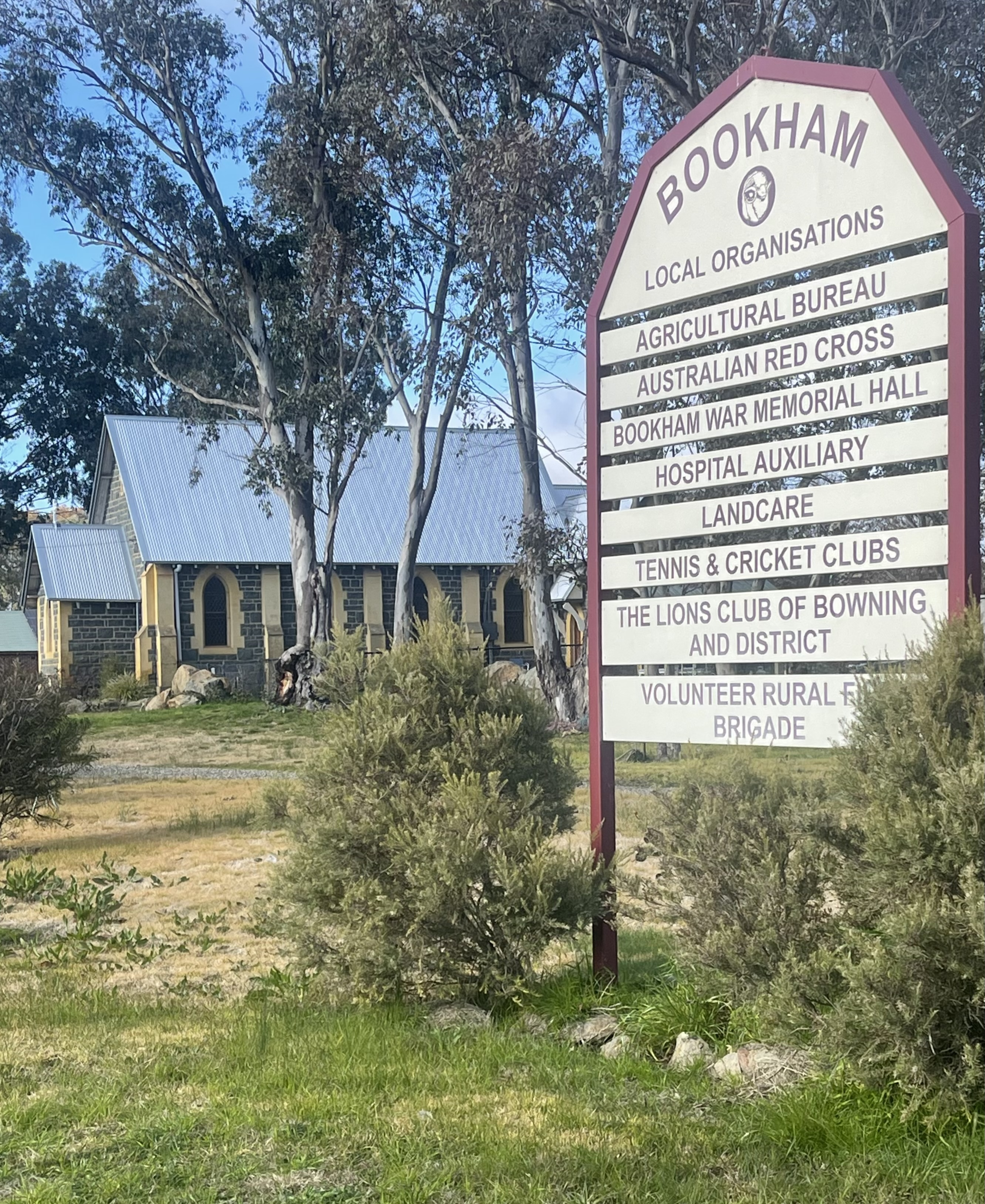
Bookham is one of the closest villages to the Hume Highway

=== Bookham ===
Bookham is situated 29 kilometres (18 mi) west of Yass. The highway once passed through the village, but now bypasses it. This bypass was completed in two stages, the south stage opened on 18 February 1998 and the north stage opened on 11 July 2001. As a result of the bypass the Bookham Rest Area was established, which is a popular stop for travellers using facilities and picnicking. It is also used as an overnight camping spot.

For many years Bookham became a quiet hamlet of two historic churches, a cricket ground, a successful worm farm and two thriving old and new machinery yards. In 2009 a cafe was open called Barney's of Bookham (now Barney's Cafe, Bookham). Barney's offers freshly prepared food in a relaxed pet friendly setting. Its recent success has led to the opening of new accommodation in the Old Bookham Church, formerly St Columba's Catholic Church. The church, now deconsecrated, combines comfort and style and can house up to six to eight guests. Both the cafe and church can claim to be amongst the closest such businesses to the highway.

=== Coolac ===
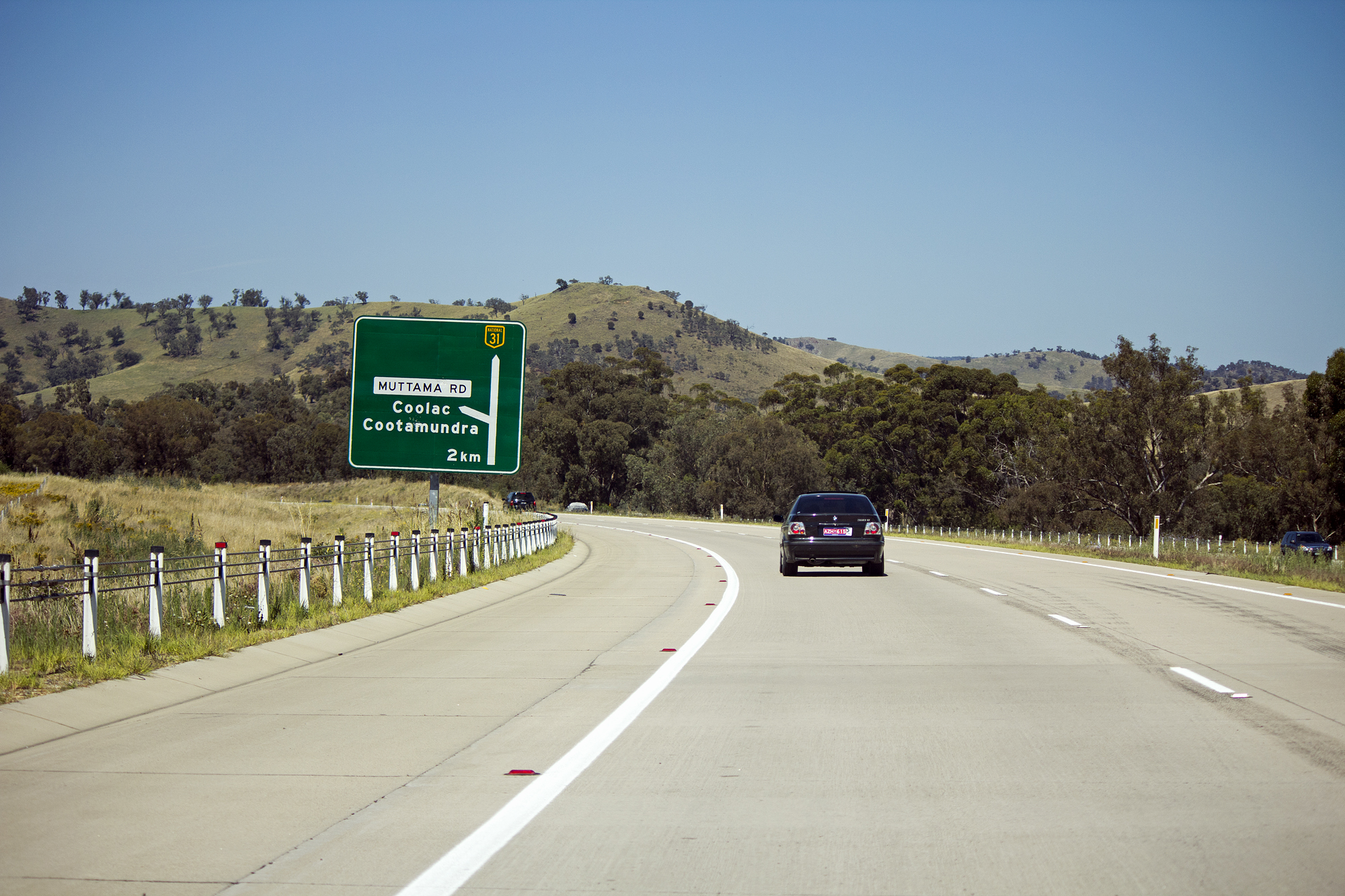
Hume Highway near Coolac

The 11-kilometre (6.8 mi) section at Coolac was the last two lane section of highway between Sydney and Gundagai until it was bypassed with a dual carriageway on 14 August 2009, after a delay due to indigenous heritage issues, the construction contract was awarded to Abigroup in February 2007.

=== Gundagai ===
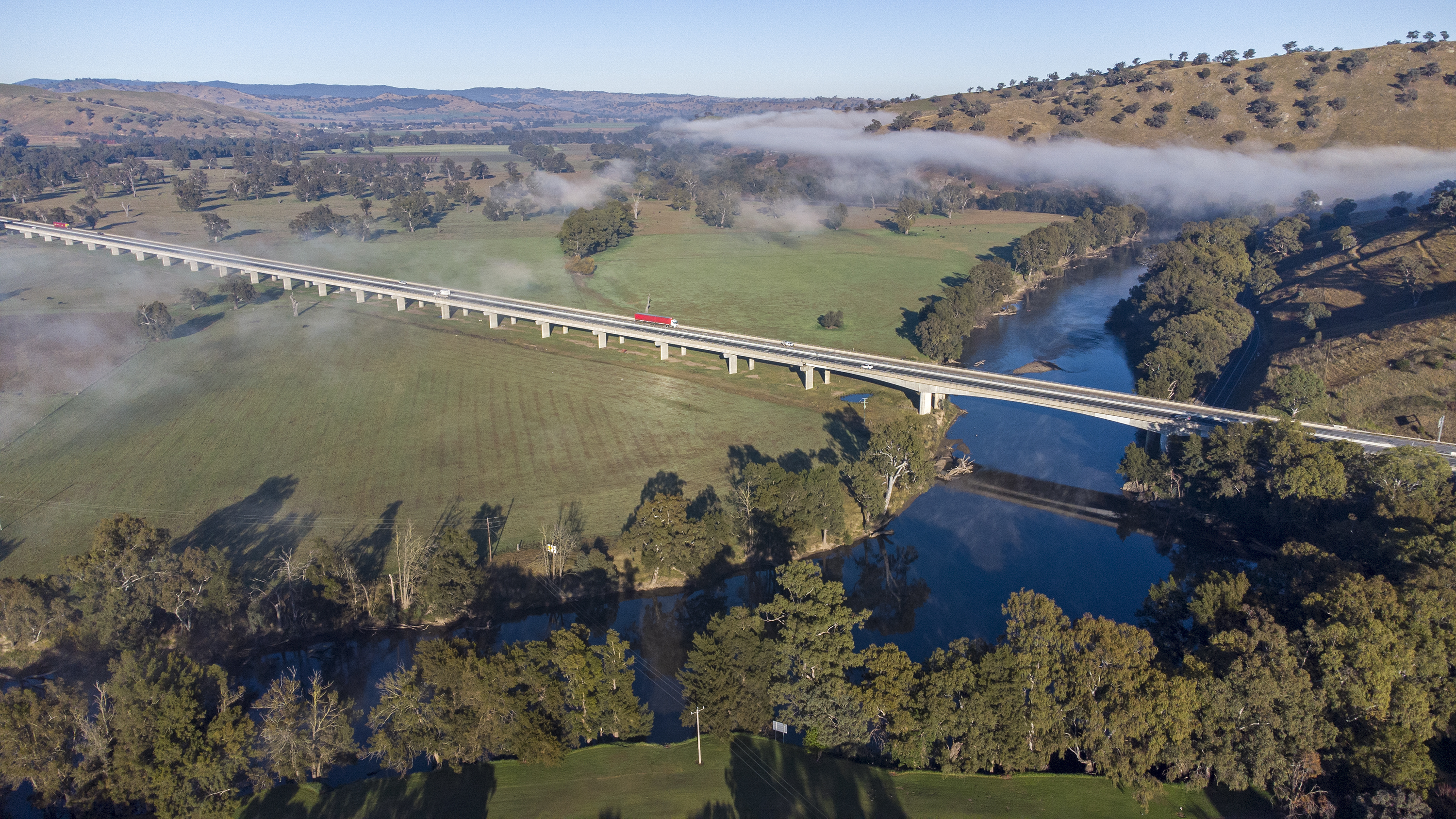
Sheahan Bridge at Gundagai

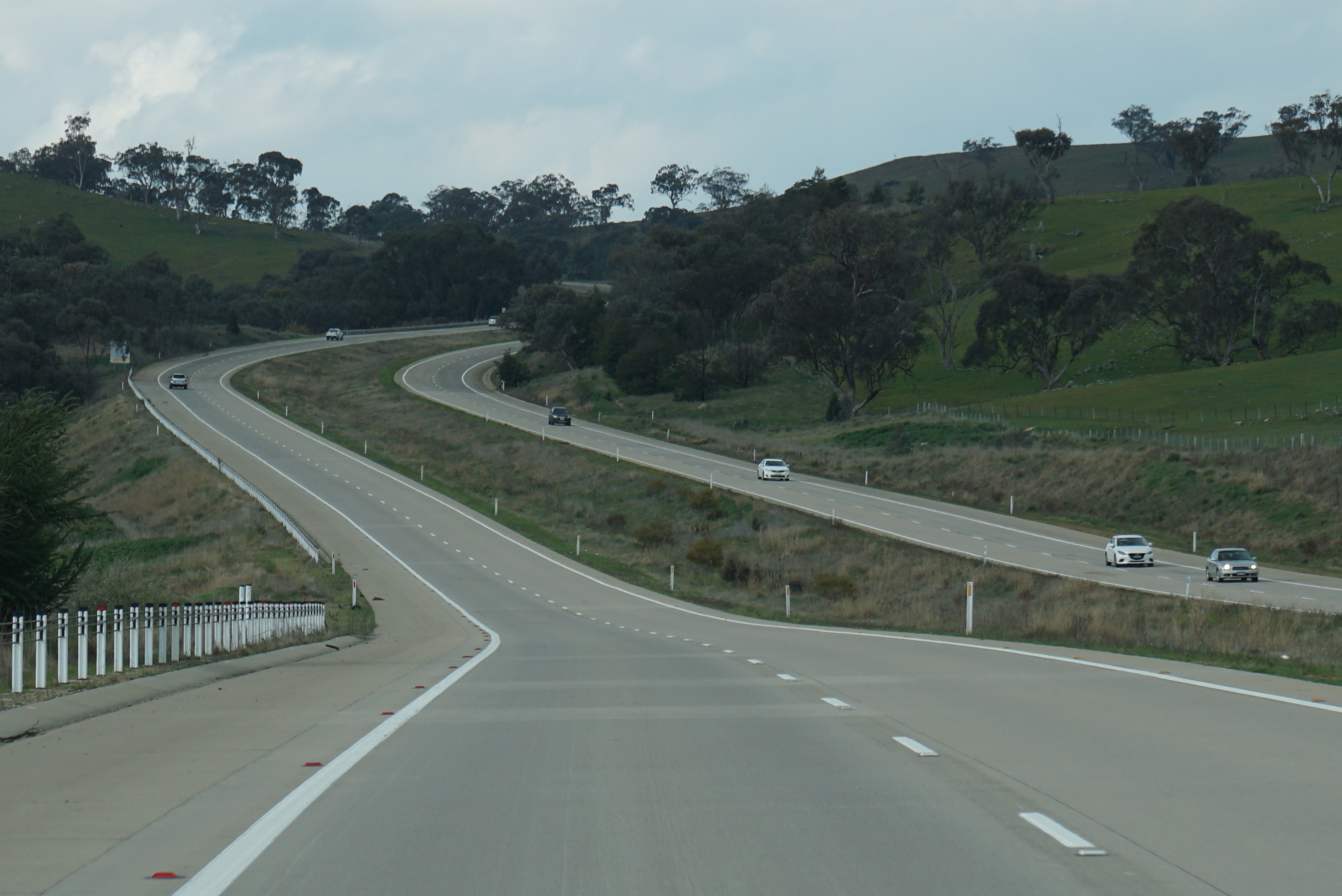
M31 Hume Highway near Gundagai

At Snake Gully, adjacent to the highway north of Gundagai is the Dog on the Tuckerbox. A statue (with a souvenir shop next door) was erected five miles (eight kilometres) from Gundagai. Snake Gully serves as a way station for many highway travellers.

Gundagai was bypassed on 25 March 1977 with the completion of the first Sheahan Bridge over the Murrumbidgee River. This bridge, named after Bill Sheahan, was the second longest road bridge in New South Wales (after the Sydney Harbour Bridge), until its duplication on 17 May 2009, This is now the fourth-longest road bridge in New South Wales – 1 metre (3 ft 3 in) longer than the Sydney Harbour Bridge. The original Sheahan Bridge was only one lane in each direction.

The Prince Alfred Bridge, on the old route of the highway across the Murrumbidgee floodplain, is of major engineering interest, as it is one of Australia's longest timber trestle bridges, as is the adjacent 1903 railway bridge. Gundagai was originally located on the river flats directly beside the Murrumbidgee River, but a disastrous flood in 1852 destroyed the town and drowned 89 people. The town was then relocated to its present position. A grade-separated interchange was completed at the intersection of the Highway and West Street in December 2006.

=== Tumblong ===
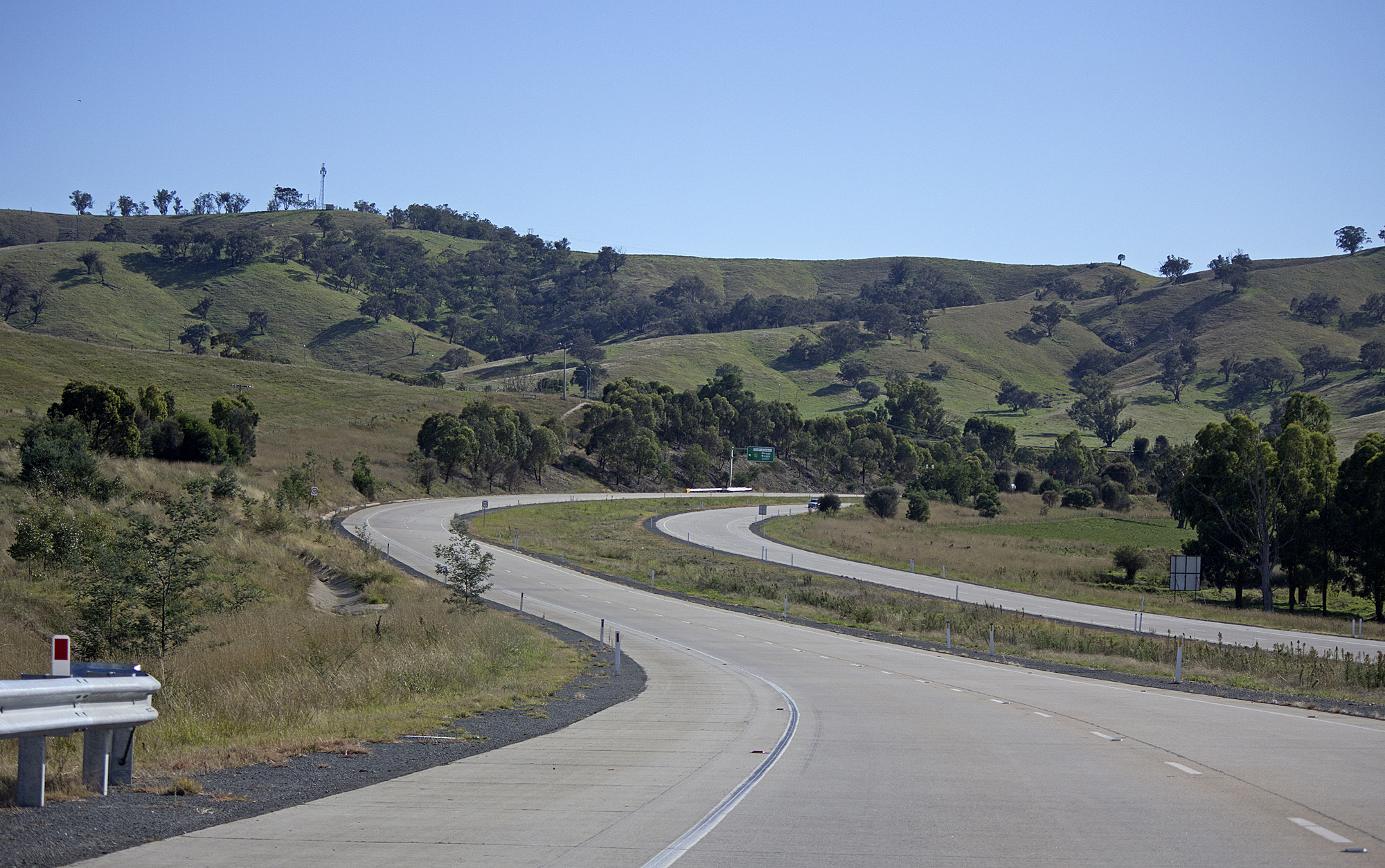
Near the Sturt Highway turnoff

The route of the highway between Tumblong and Tarcutta is the third route of the highway in this location. The original route led west from Tumblong along the Murrumbidgee River, before turning south over difficult country, crossing what is now the Sturt Highway and rejoining the current route of the highway as Lower Tarcutta Road. This was replaced in December 1938 by the first Tumblong deviation, to the east of the current route. The main features of this section of the highway were a deep, narrow cutting and the reinforced concrete bowstring arch bridge over Hillas Creek. This bridge has been preserved as it is one of only two bridges in New South Wales built to this design, and is visible on the western side of the highway close to the interchange with the Snowy Mountains Highway. The second and current deviation opened to traffic on 21 November 1983.

Approximately 38 kilometres (24 mi) southwest of Gundagai is the interchange with Sturt Highway, which leads to Wagga Wagga, Mildura and Adelaide.

=== Tarcutta ===
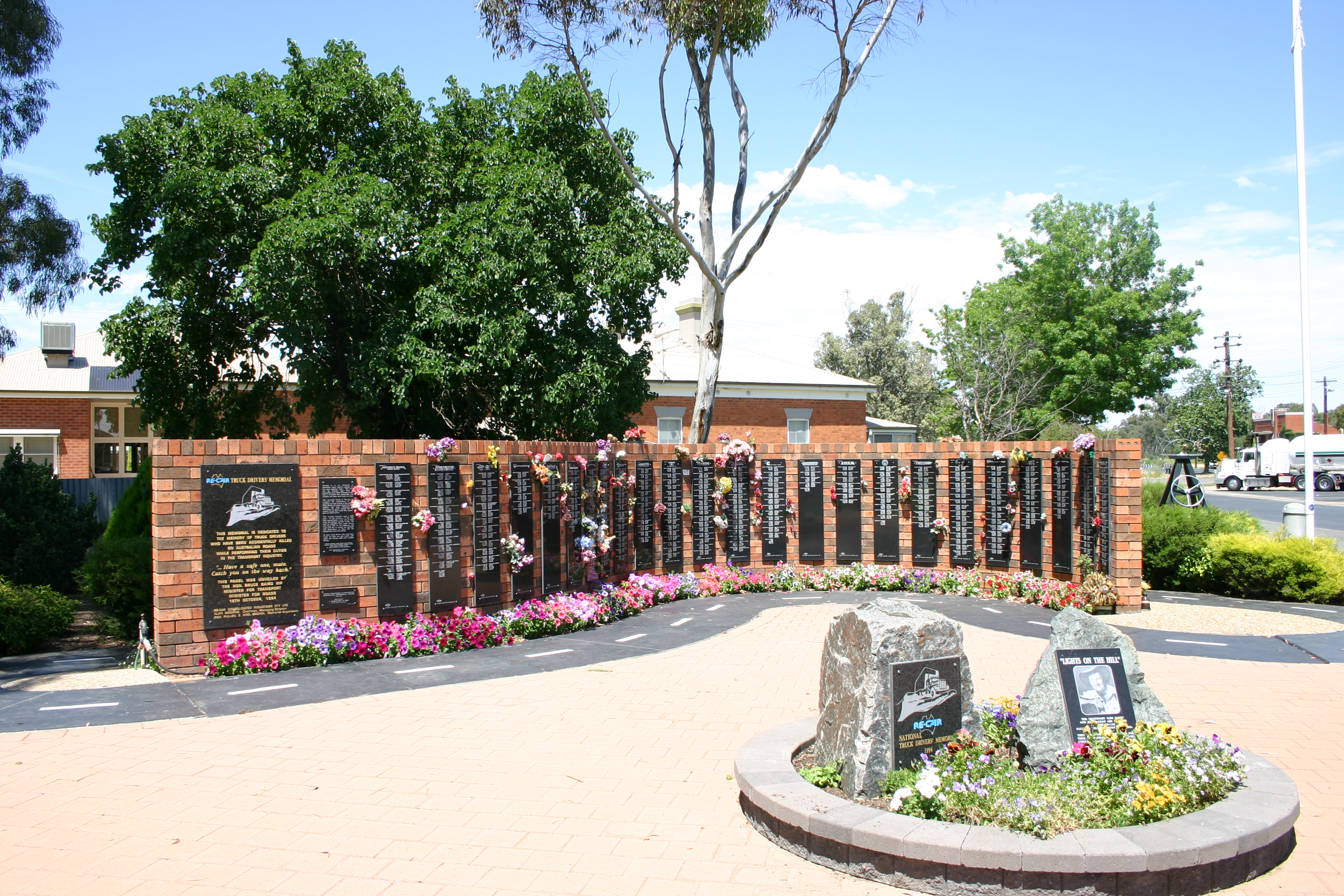
National Truck Driver Memorial at Tarcutta

Tarcutta is located almost exactly halfway between Sydney and Melbourne and has been a popular stopover and change-over point for truck drivers making their way between the two cities. There is a memorial to truck drivers who have died on the local stretch of Hume Highway. It was near Tarcutta that the final section of Hume Highway was sealed in 1940. Construction began on a 7-kilometre (4.3 mi) bypass of Tarcutta in 2010. The bypass, which passes west of the town, was opened to traffic on 15 November 2011. As improvements to the Hume Highway have reduced travelling time between Sydney and Melbourne to about nine hours driving time in good conditions, the town's importance to the average motorist has diminished.

=== Holbrook ===
Holbrook was called Germanton until anti-German sentiment during World War I led to the town and the shire being renamed in honour of the wartime submarine captain, Lt Holbrook who was awarded the Victoria Cross. From 1995, a feature of the town has been a partial reconstruction of HMAS Otway, an Oberon class submarine. This landmark was in recognition of the town's namesake's connections with submarines. Holbrook had the only set of traffic signals (for pedestrians) that remained on the Hume Highway between the Sydney Orbital and Melbourne's Western Ring Road. A bypass, that was officially opened by Prime Minister, Julia Gillard and Minister for Infrastructure and Transport, Anthony Albanese on 23 June 2013, did not open for traffic until August 2013.

=== Woomargama ===
Woomargama, is a village between Holbrook and Albury which acts as a local service centre for a rich wool-growing area. The 9-kilometre (5.6 mi) bypass of Woomargama was opened on 7 November 2011.

=== Bowna and Table Top ===
Table Top is a small town located approximately 16 kilometres (9.9 mi) north of Albury, and Bowna is a locality about 18 kilometres (11 mi) to the east of Table Top. In the 1950s, the road was diverted a much longer route to the northwest, intersecting with Olympic Highway south of Gerogery, to allow the construction of the Hume Dam. This in turn was superseded by the dual carriage way which straightened the route.

Remnants of the old original road still exist as Old Sydney Road to the north east of Thurgoona and Plunketts Road in Bowna. The route is visible on aerial imagery (when water levels are low), following a line from the intersection with Table Top Road, pointing directly to Bowna and Mullengandra. Remnants of the old single lane highway used from the 1950s can be seen and used for vehicular traffic. This section was renamed as Bowna Road.

=== Albury–Wodonga ===
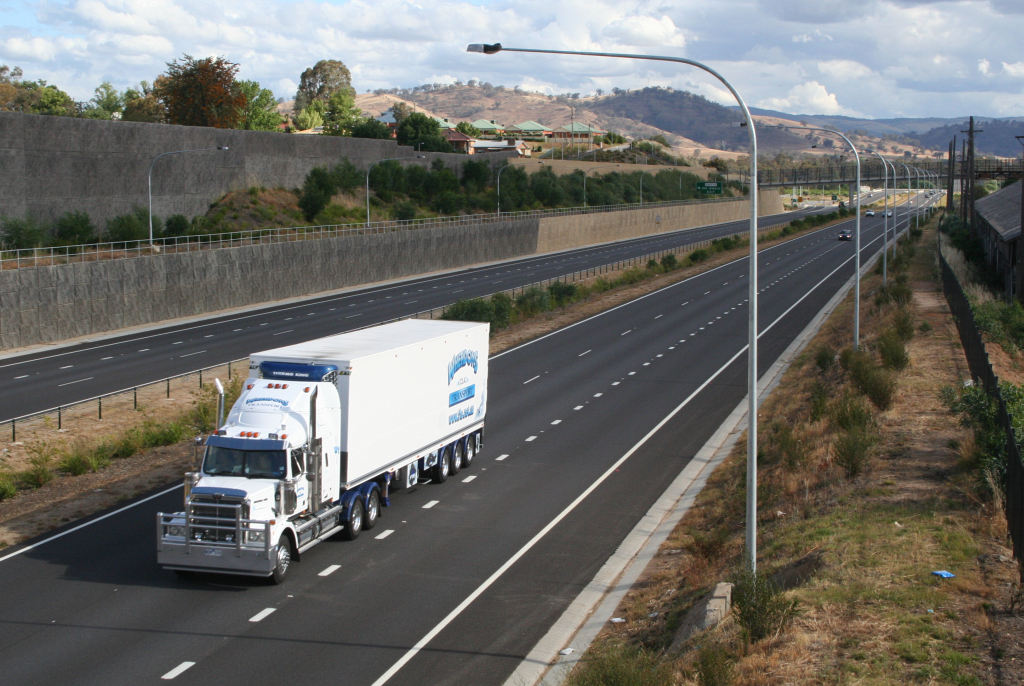
The Hume Highway by-passing the Albury CBD.

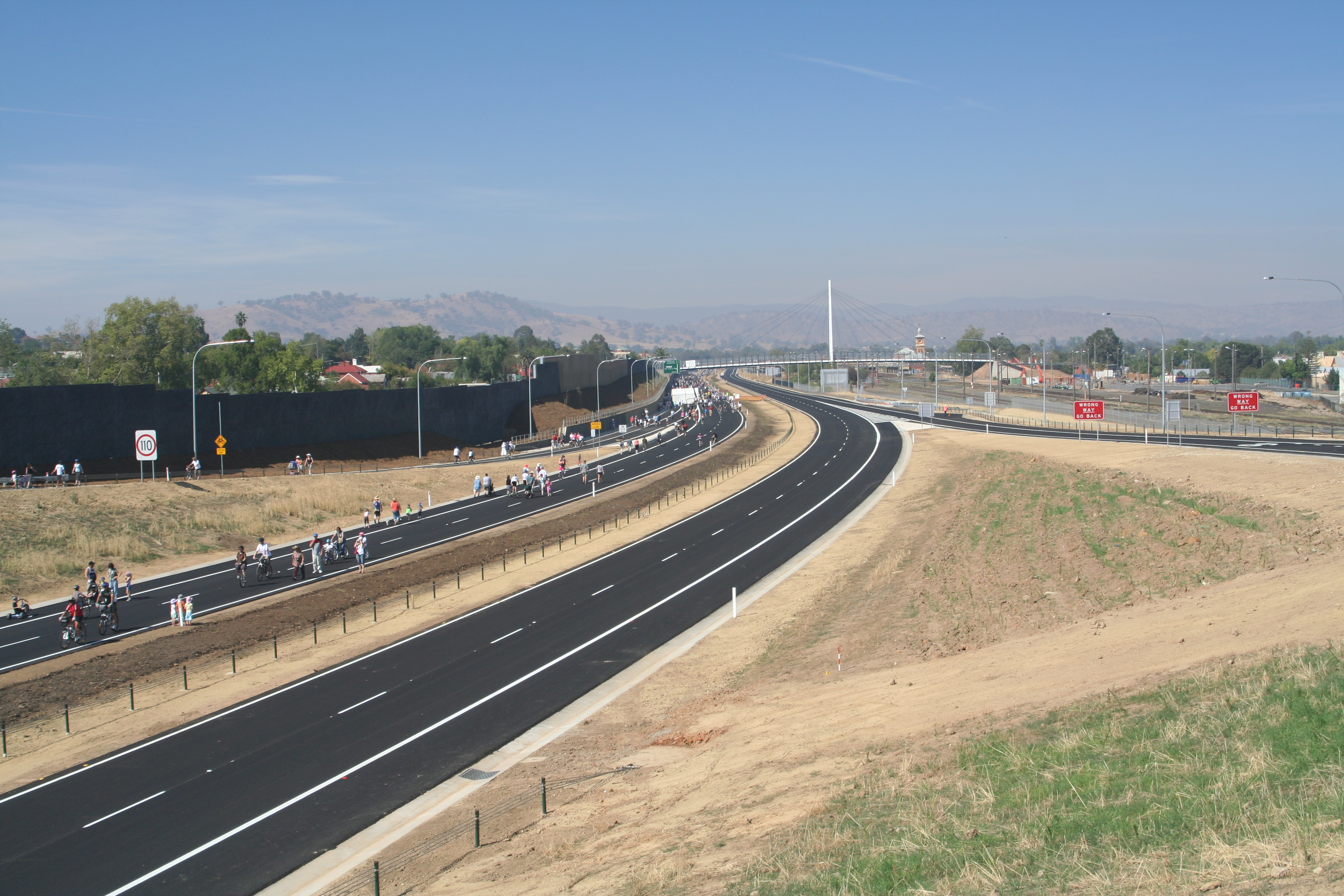
Hume Highway ramp at Albury

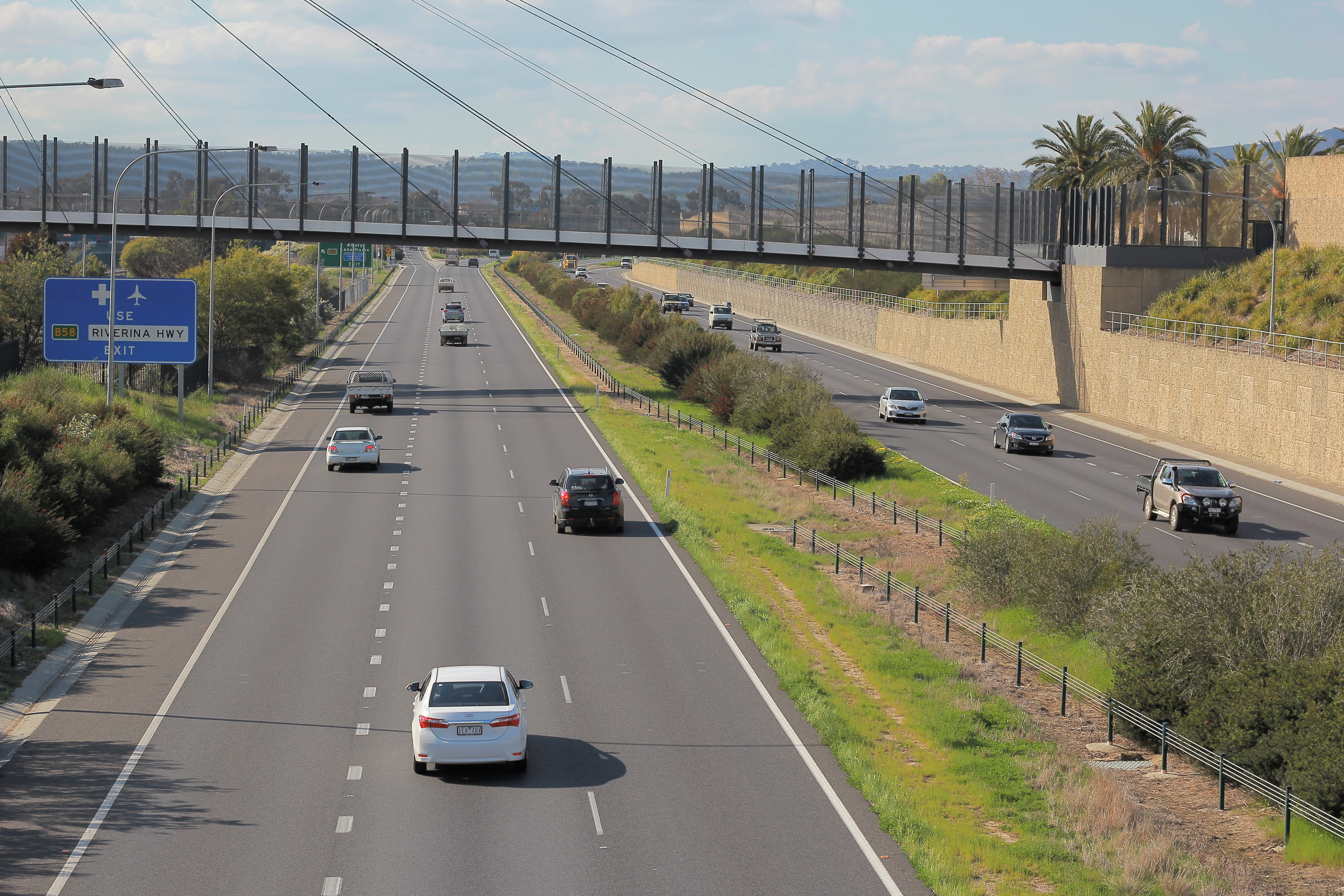
Hume Highway from an overpass at Albury

Albury's history is linked with the two famous Australian explorers, Hamilton Hume and William Hovell, as the city's location sprung from their crossing of the Murray River. Albury, commonly associated with its Victorian twin, Wodonga, is one of the few rural Australian cities to experience a boom, mainly from industrialisation in recent times.

The Albury bypass was first proposed in 1964 but only opened on 6 March 2007. Following a series of announcements and changes of plans through the 1990s, when Albury residents failed to agree on whether an 'internal' or 'external' bypass route was more appropriate, the 'internal bypass' option was chosen. Approval was granted in 2004 and construction, by Abigroup, began in January 2005. The route is parallel to and on the eastern side of the Sydney–Melbourne railway, beginning at the railway overpass 10 kilometres (6.2 mi) north of Albury. After crossing the Murray River, the bypass crosses the railway to rejoin the previous highway at the southern end of the Lincoln Causeway, connecting to the Wodonga bypass. The Albury bypass includes a freeway standard connection to Murray Valley Highway at Bandiana, east of Wodonga.

=== Wangaratta ===
Wangaratta is, after Wodonga, the largest centre in northeast Victoria, with a population of approximately 17,000 at the 2011 census. Wangaratta is at the junction of the Great Alpine Road. Hume and Hovell passed through this area on their 1824 expedition and the town was founded in 1837 when the surrounding area was opened for farming. The town was bypassed in 1994.

Attractions include Merriwa Park, a sunken garden adjacent to the King River, Airworld at Wangaratta Airport, and old goldfield areas of nearby Beechworth and Chiltern.

=== Benalla ===
Benalla is a large town located just off Hume Freeway between Melbourne and Wangaratta. Founded in 1848, growth was slow until a goldrush in the 1850s. It had many associations with the Kelly gang and the courthouse was the venue for a number of their trials. It also has a memorial to the Australian war hero Sir Edward 'Weary' Dunlop, an Australian doctor who acted as a leader to allied troops on the Thailand-Burma Railway in World War II.

=== Euroa ===
Euroa is famous for a Ned Kelly bank robbery. The town is located on the Seven Creeks and has pretty gardens and a number of attractive 19th century buildings.

=== Seymour ===
The bypass of Seymour opened in December 1982. Seymour remains on the Goulburn Valley Highway. The town is in the rich Goulburn Valley which supports the local vineyards. The large Puckapunyal military base is located west of Seymour. Once the centre of the bushranging area of Victoria, it has a museum which displays many period relics of that era. It was until the 1970s a major railway maintenance centre, and part of the railway workshops now houses a railway museum. The museum's collection of rolling stock, including State carriages used by governors and monarchs, is extensive.

=== Kalkallo ===
Construction of the Donnybrook Road interchange, immediately to the north of the Craigieburn Bypass, replaced the dangerous at-grade intersection with (C723) at Kalkallo an overpass and entry/exit ramps in both directions, at a cost of $32 million. Works commenced in December 2007 and completion occurred in March 2009, three months ahead of schedule.

=== Craigieburn ===
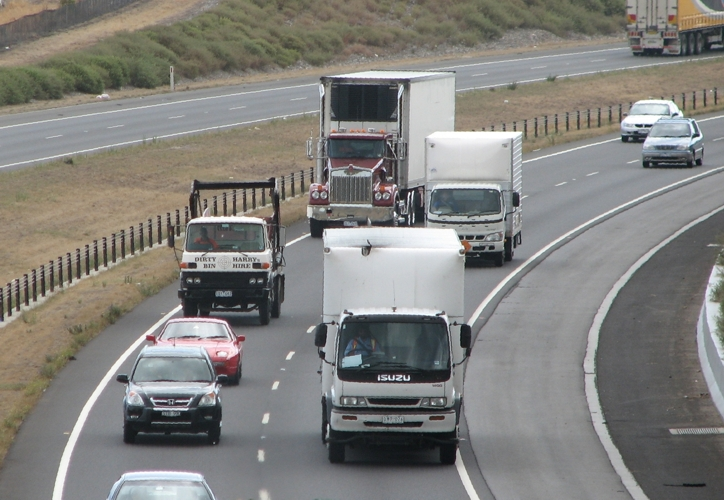
Craigieburn Bypass

Prior to the opening of the Craigieburn Bypass in 2005, the Hume Highway skirted Craigieburn (the town centre was bypassed in the 1950s). The section of the highway from Craigieburn to Campbellfield (on Melbourne's outskirts) was a significant bottleneck, with 12 sets of traffic signals in 17-kilometre (11 mi) section of road. The Craigieburn Bypass now links directly to the Western and Metropolitan Ring Roads. By 2013, the Old Hume Highway (Sydney Road) section from Fawkner to Campbellfield was again becoming a bottleneck due to poor traffic signal coordination. There was some opposition for the bypass by several local governments in the northern suburbs of Melbourne, including the City of Darebin and the City of Merri-bek, as well as local environmental groups. Their alternative proposal was rejected by the state government. A pedestrian and cyclist cement path – the Galada Tamboore Pathway – runs the length of the bypass and connects with the Metropolitan Ring Road path, from where it is possible to connect to the Merri Creek Trail, Western Ring Road Trail, the City of Whittlesea Public Gardens and Edgars Road. The Craigieburn Bypass is shown in the 1969 Melbourne Transportation Plan as part of the F2 Freeway corridor, which extended south along Merri Creek, Hoddle St, Barkly St in St Kilda, south through Elwood and Brighton, then east along South Road, connecting to the Dingley Freeway corridor.

== Alternative routes ==
The main alternative route between Sydney and Melbourne is the Princes Highway/Princes Freeway/Princes Motorway route (A1/M1) which follows the coast for most of its length. Other inland alternate routes include the Olympic Highway route (A41) between Albury and Sydney via Wagga Wagga, Cowra and Bathurst, and also the Federal Highway / Monaro Highway route (M23/A23/B23) via Canberra which links with Hume Highway near Goulburn and Princes Highway in East Gippsland.

== Incidents ==
In 1989, the professional golfer Jerry Stolhand died in a car accident on the highway at Breadalbane, New South Wales. The Hume Highway was also where notorious serial killer Ivan Milat picked up several of his victims.

== See also ==
- Old Hume Highway
- Highways in Australia
- Highways in New South Wales
- Highways in Victoria
- Freeways in Australia
- Freeways in New South Wales
- Freeways in Victoria

== Bibliography ==
- Carroll, Brian (1983). The Hume – Australia's highway of history. Kangaroo Press. ISBN 0949924482.
- Gard, Stephen (2017). Once Upon a Hume (Series). BlueDawe Books. ISBN 978-0-9924751-1-6.
- McGirr, Michael (2005). Bypass: The Story of a road. ISBN 9780330421904.
- "The Old Hume Highway – History begins with a road" (PDF). Roads & Maritime Services. Government of New South Wales; Australian Government. May 2013. Archived from the original (PDF) on 30 March 2019.
