= Yarara, New South Wales =

Historical rural locality in New South Wales, Australia

Yarara, New South Wales is an historical rural locality in the Snowy Monaro Regional Council located at 35°44′54″S 149°06′04″E.
