= Woomargama National Park =

National park in New South Wales, Australia

Woomargama
- IUCN category II (national park)
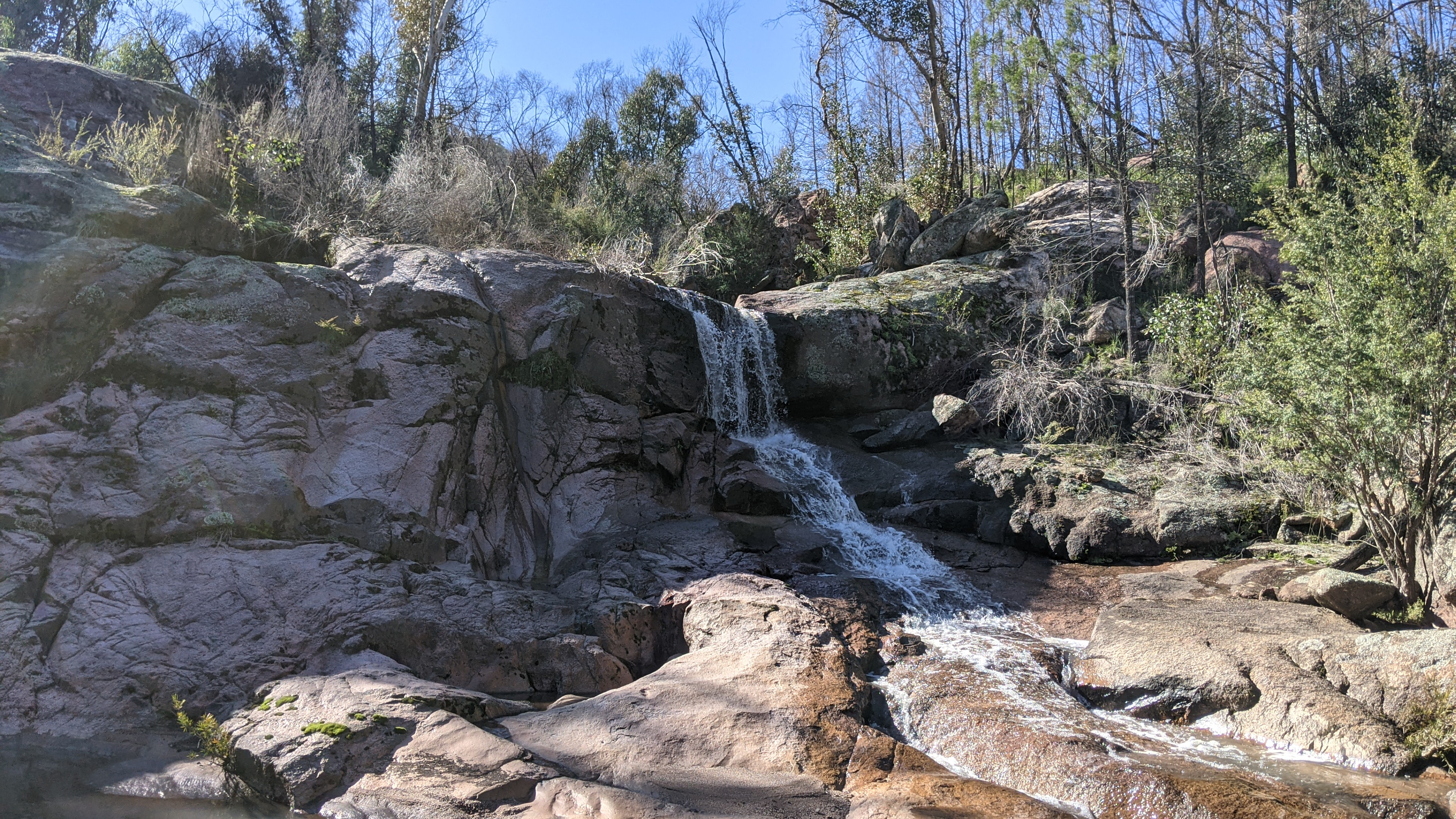
- Waterfall, Woomargama National Park

- Location within New South Wales
- Location: New South Wales
- Nearest city: Woomargama
- Coordinates: 35°52′17.16″S 147°29′7.28″E
- Area: 241.85 km^{2} (93.38 sq mi)
- Established: January 2001
- Governing body: New South Wales National Parks and Wildlife Service

Woomargama National Park is a national park situated 20 kilometres (12 mi) south east of Holbrook and 30 kilometres (19 mi) north east of Albury, in the South West Slopes region of southern New South Wales. Southern extremities of the park are within one kilometre of Lake Hume which is formed on the Murray River. The park extends over approximately 30 km from eastern to western boundaries and 15 km in a north to south direction. In 2006, the park covered an area of 23,577 hectares and at the same time an area of associated reserve covered 7,120 hectares. In 2010 the park alone covered 24,185 ha.

Woomargama was gazetted, from the formation of Woomargama, Dora Dora and Tipperary State Forests along with other Crown Land portions, in January 2001 as part of the Southern Regional Forest Agreement in 2000.

== Environment ==
Some of the bird species that can be found in the park include superb parrot. Other native species include echidnas, wombats, gliders, kangaroos and wallabies.

== See also ==
- Protected areas of New South Wales (Australia)
