= Woomargama =

- Town
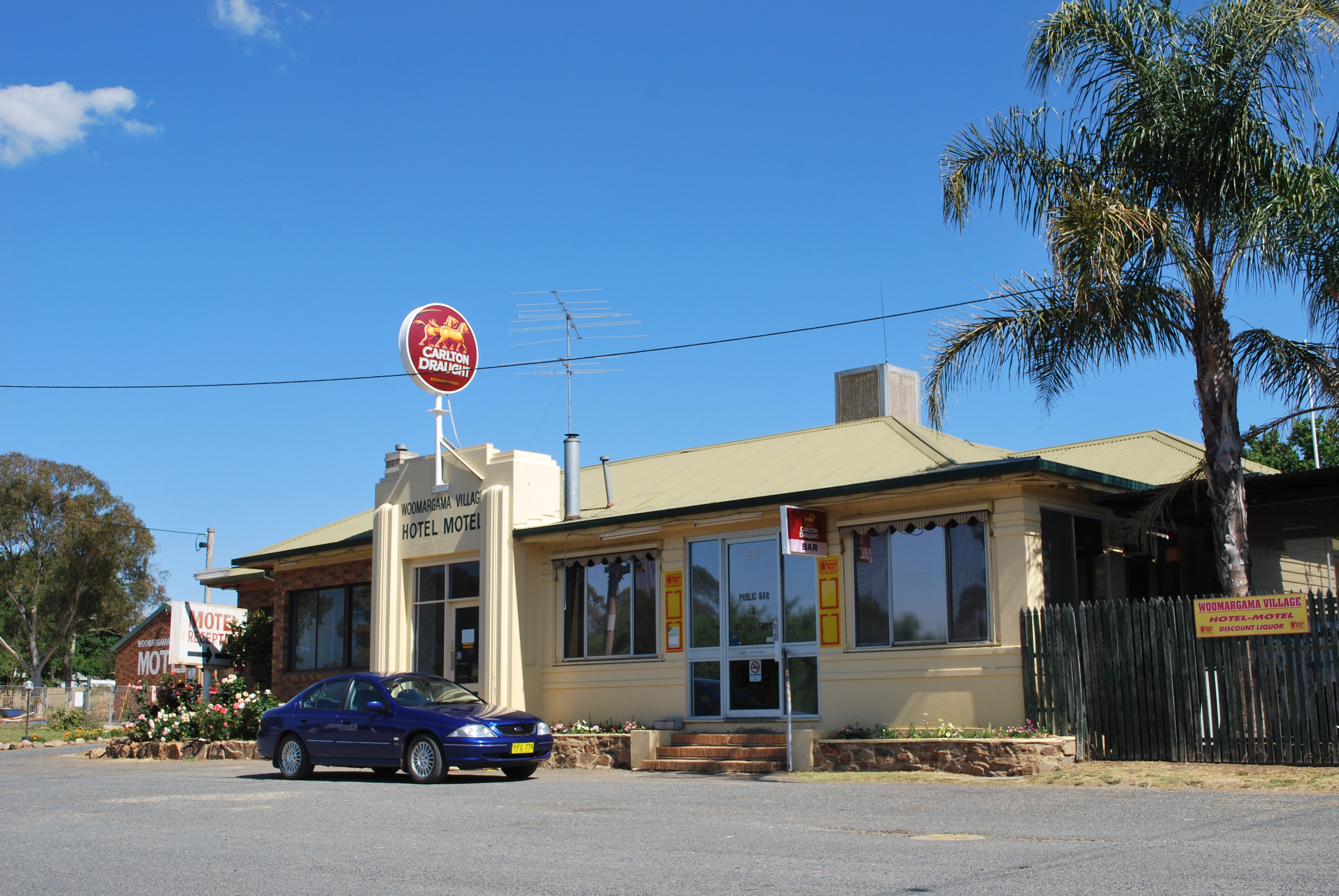
- Woomagarma Hotel/Motel, 2009

- Coordinates: 35°49′58″S 147°14′51″E
- Country: Australia
- State: New South Wales
- LGA: Greater Hume Shire Council
- Location: 508 km (316 mi) SW of Sydney; 372 km (231 mi) NW of Melbourne; 48 km (30 mi) NE of Albury; 15 km (9.3 mi) S of Holbrook

Government
  - State electorate: Albury
  - Federal division: Farrer
- Elevation: 407 m (1,335 ft)

Population
  - Total: 173 (SAL 2021)
- Postcode: 2644
- County: Goulburn

Woomargama (/wuːˈmɑːrɡæmə/) is a locality in southwestern New South Wales, Australia. The locality is in the South West Slopes region, in the foothills of the Great Dividing Range. It is in the Greater Hume Shire local government area, 508 kilometres (316 mi) south-west of the state capital, Sydney and 48 kilometres (30 mi) north-east of the regional city of Albury. At the 2006 census, Woomargama had a population of 251.

Woomargama post office was opened on 1 August 1875. The village has a hotel/motel, a post office situated in the historic school building, a community hall, fire station and tennis courts, a park with barbecues and public conveniences, and a town common. The village is ideally situated to access Woomargama National Park and the upper Murray River.

== Woomargama bypass ==
Woomargama was originally on the Hume Highway, but a bypass was opened west of the town in November 2011.
