= Bowna =

- Town
- Coordinates: 35°58′S 147°08′E
- Country: Australia
- State: New South Wales
- LGA: Greater Hume Shire Council
- Location: 524 km (326 mi) from Sydney; 33 km (21 mi) from Albury; 18 km (11 mi) from Table Top; 7 km (4.3 mi) from Mullengandra

Government
  - State electorate: Albury
  - Federal division: Farrer

Population
  - Total: 110 (2016 census)
- Postcode: 2644
- County: Goulburn

Bowna is a locality in the southeast part of the Riverina, New South Wales, Australia.

== Geography ==
By road Bowna is about 7 kilometres (4.3 miles) south west of Mullengandra and 18 kilometres (11.2 miles) east of Table Top.

== History ==
The former village of Bowna was inundated by the Hume Reservoir but the locality and community outside the village still exist.

The St Francis de Sales Catholic Church building was opened in 1934 in Memory of the Pioneers, and replaced an earlier 1865 church building which was submerged under the Hume Reservoir. The church held its final mass in August 2025 and was put up for sale.

Bowna Post Office opened on 1 May 1869 and closed in 1994.

== Sports and recreation ==
The Bowna Football Club was established in 1911 and they played some friendly against other local towns up until 1915. The club was re-established in 1920 after World War I. Bowna were runner's up to St. Patrick's FC in the 1921 Albury B. Grade Football Association premiership. Bowna were once again runners up in the Albury B. Grade FA premiership in 1922, this time to the Lavington Football Club. After being minor premiers in the Albury B. Grade FA for the third successive year, Bowna once again lost the premiership, this time to Jindera in 1923, after kicking 2.18 – 30 to Jindera's 5.3 – 30 in the grand final.

Bowna FC competed in the Albury & Border Football Association in 1925 & 1926, before going into recess in 1927, Bowna then competed in the Central Hume Football Association in 1928, before permanently folding up as a club after the 1928 football season.

== Links ==
- 1922 - Bowna Football Club team photo
