= Mitchell, New South Wales =

Mitchell New South Wales
- Coordinates: 33°25′29″S 149°33′59″E
- Population: 1,310 (2016 census)
- LGA(s): Bathurst Region
- State electorate(s): Bathurst
- Federal division(s): Calare

Mitchell is a suburb of Bathurst, New South Wales, Australia, in the Bathurst Region.
