= Hill Top railway station =

Former railway station in New South Wales, Australia

Hill Top
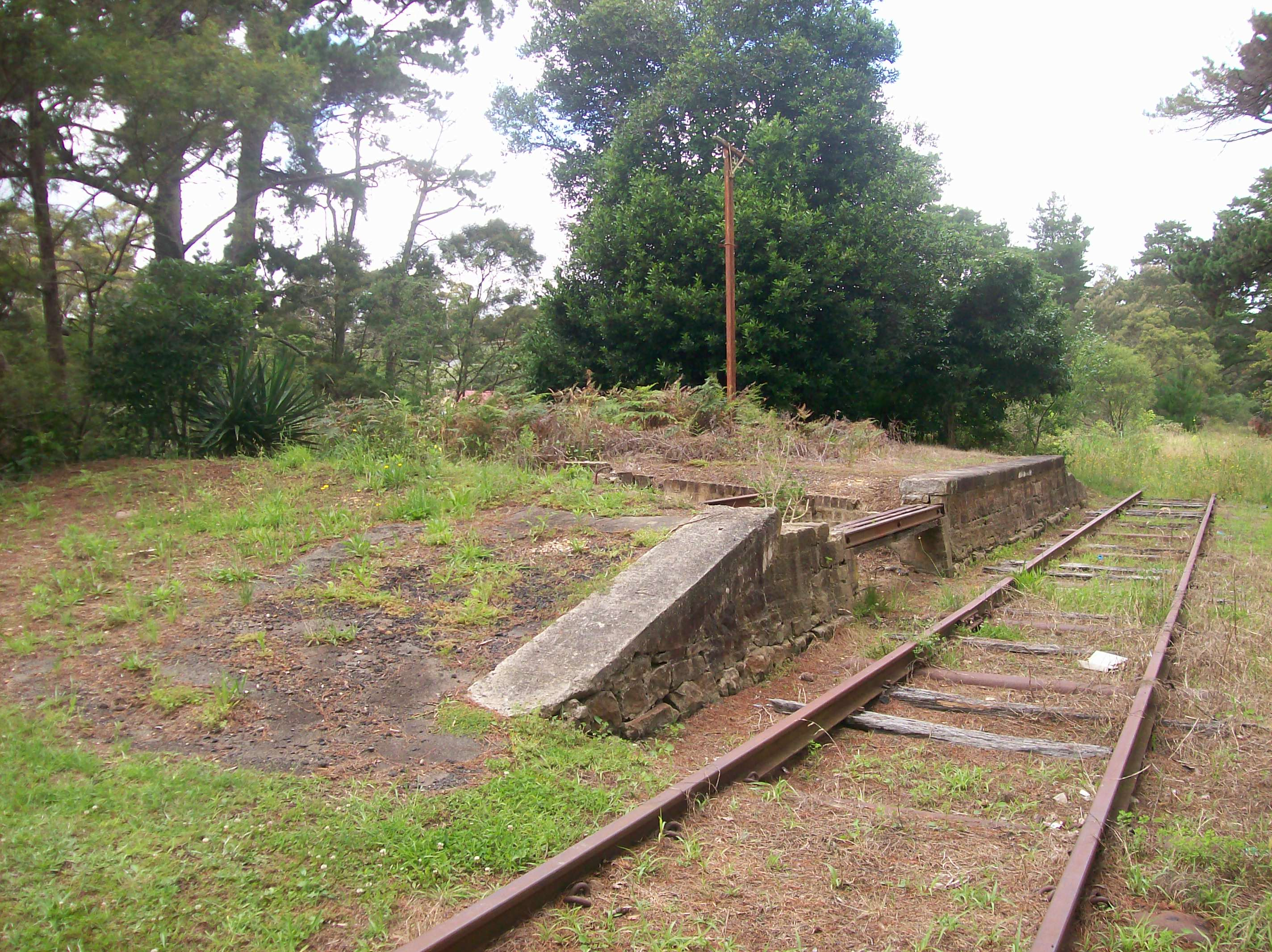

General information
- Coordinates: 34°21′12″S 150°29′40″E
- Lines: Picton loop line Main South
- Platforms: 1
- Tracks: 1

Other information
- Status: Closed, partially demolished

History
- Opened: 5 December 1878
- Closed: 1978

Services
Preceding station	Former services	Following station
Colo Vale towards Mittagong	Picton–Mittagong Loop Line	Balmoral towards Picton
Location

Hill Top is a former railway station which was located on the Picton – Mittagong loop railway line. It served the small town of Hill Top, a Northern Village of the Southern Highlands of New South Wales, Australia.

== History ==
The station opened on 5 December 1878 as Big Hill Upper Siding, was renamed Colo in 1881 and became Hill Top on 1 May 1883. The station along with the Loop Line was closed in 1978.

The station has been almost demolished, the platform building is gone and the platform is being restored. The loop line from Picton to Colo Vale is in transition to reopen. Upgrades are in progress.

== See also ==
- List of disused railway stations in New South Wales
