= Braemar (disambiguation) =

Braemar is a village in Aberdeenshire, Scotland, located in the eastern Grampian Mountains.

Braemar may also refer to:

- Braemar, New South Wales, a village in Australia
- M/S Braemar or M/S Regina Baltica, a ferry
- MS Braemar, a 1993 cruise ship

== See also ==
- Braemar Castle, a castle near Braemar, Scotland
- Braemar Gathering or Braemar Games, in Braemar, Scotland
- Braemar Hill, Hong Kong
