= Braemar railway station =

Former railway station in New South Wales, Australia

Braemar
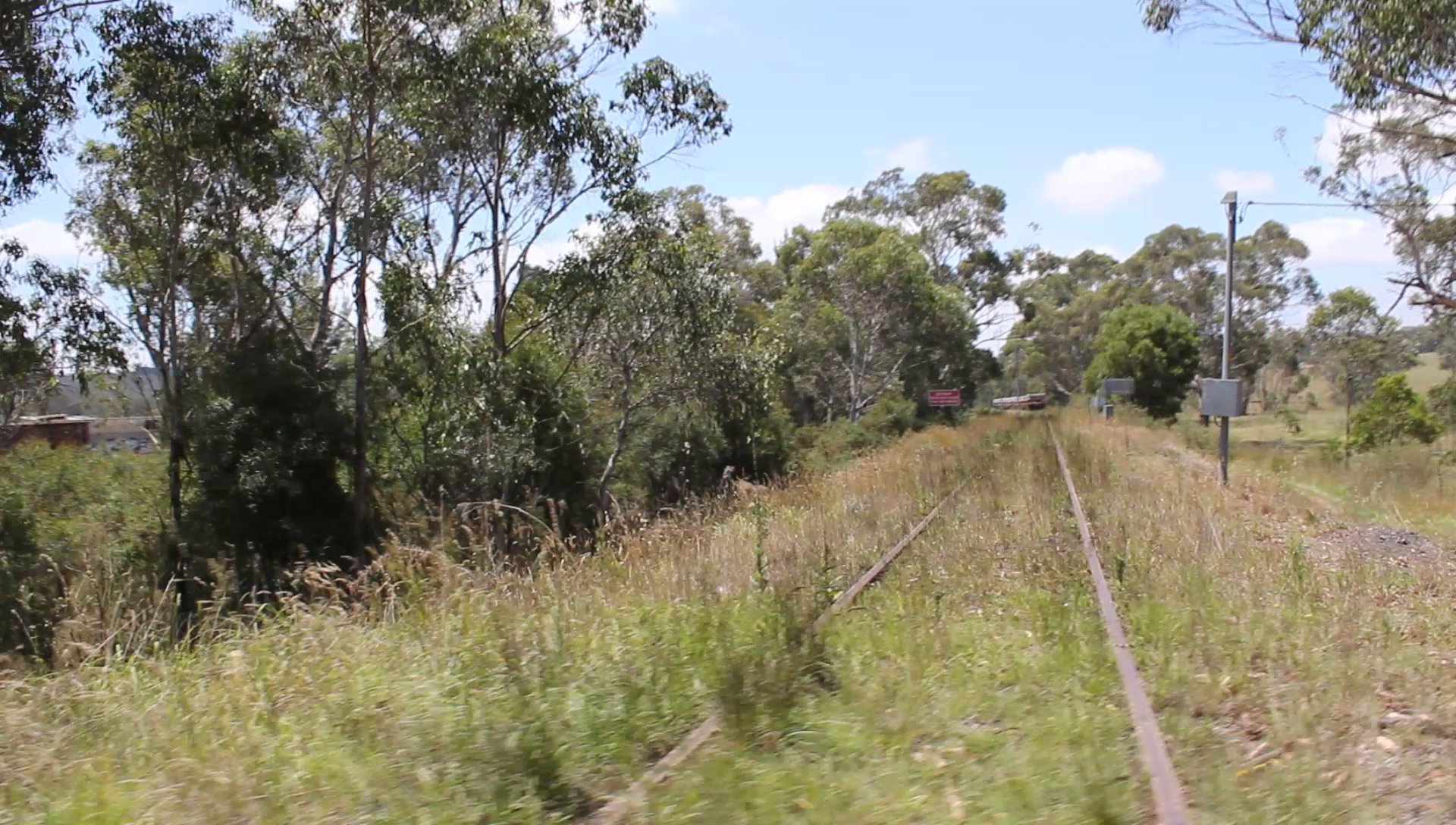
- Former site of Braemar Station, left side of track

General information
- Coordinates: 34°25′42″S 150°28′45″E
- Lines: Picton loop line; Main South line
- Platforms: 1 (formerly)
- Tracks: 1

Other information
- Status: Demolished and closed

History
- Opened: 1 May 1867 as Rushs Platform
- Closed: 5 August 1978

Services
Preceding station	Former services	Following station
Mittagong Terminus	Picton–Mittagong Loop Line	Colo Vale towards Picton
Location

Braemar is a former railway station which was located on the Picton – Mittagong loop railway line. It served Braemar, a small town in the Macarthur Region of New South Wales, Australia.

== History ==
The station opened on 1 March 1867 as Rush's Platform upon the opening of the Great Southern Railway extension to Goulburn.

The station served the Rush's Family Hotel owned by Bartholomew Rush and his wife.

It first appears in a footnote of the Great Southern Railway Timetable on 20 March 1867 as a stop for setting down and picking up passengers if required. At the time, it was the only other station to be opened on the extension. In later timetables, it was referred to as "Rush's" and explicitly listed as a stop. Initially, two Up services and two Down services passed the platform each day with an additional service on Saturdays. Travel time to/from Sydney was about 3.5 hours.

Until 10 May 1891, Mixed and Goods trains were not permitted to stop at this platform. However, this instruction was amended to allow for Up Goods trains to stop to pick up fruit when required.

By April 1892, the station was referred to as "Braemar (late Rush's)" at least internally to the government. However, the station name was still published in newspapers as "Rush's Platform" until late 1892.

The station along with the Loop Line was closed in 1978. There are no remains of the station.
