= Wattle Ridge =

Wattle Ridge may refer to:

- Wattle Ridge, New South Wales, a locality in Wingecarribee Shire, New South Wales, Australia
- Wattle Ridge, Queensland, a locality in the Toowoomba Region, Queensland, Australia
