= Colo Vale railway station =

Former railway station in New South Wales, Australia

Colo Vale
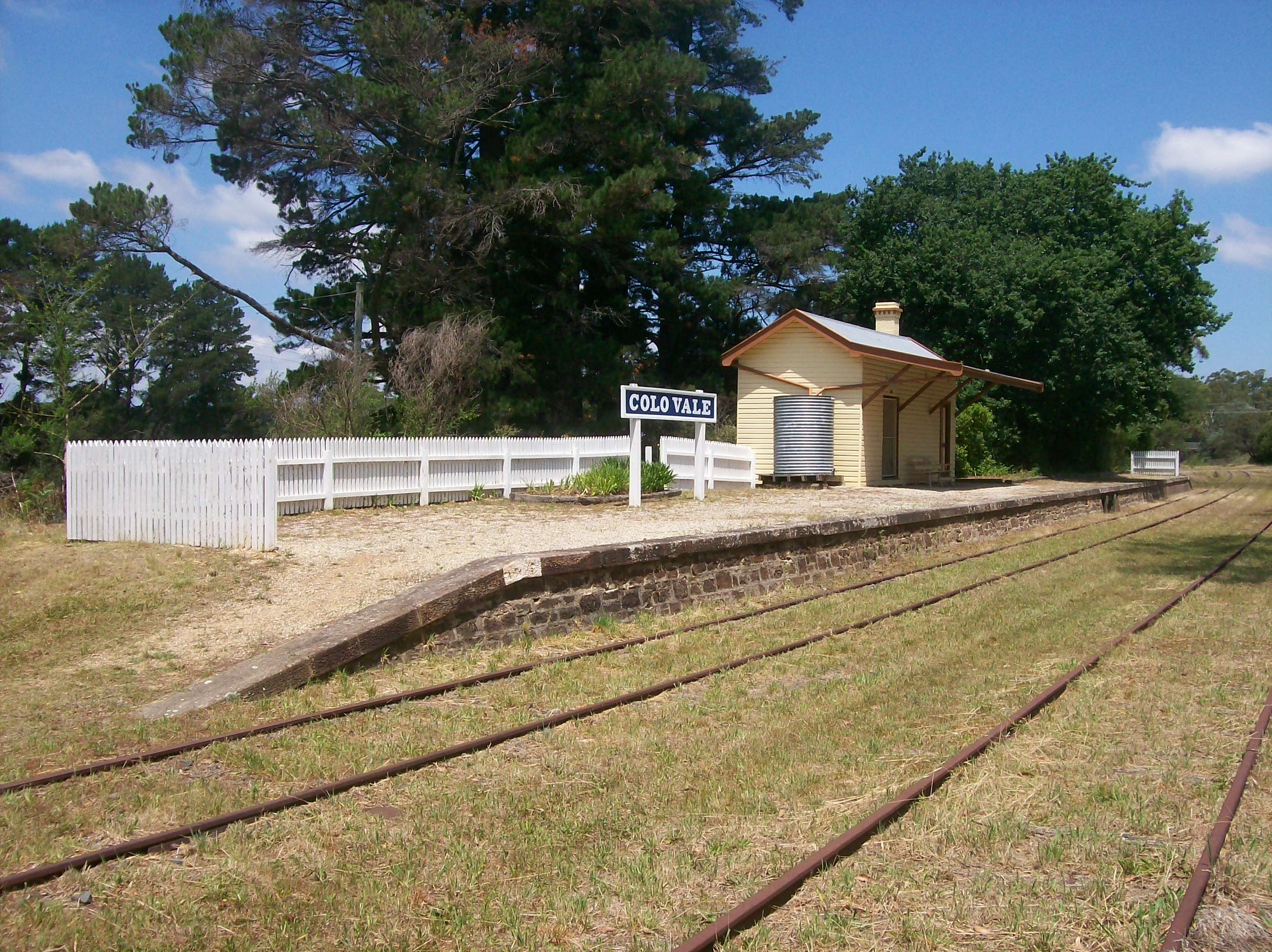

General information
- Coordinates: 34°24′01″S 150°29′16″E
- System: Regional rail
- Lines: Picton loop line; Main South line
- Platforms: 1
- Tracks: 2

Other information
- Status: Closed, restored for preservation

History
- Opened: 1 May 1883
- Closed: 1978

Services
Preceding station	Former services	Following station
Braemar towards Mittagong	Picton–Mittagong Loop Line	Hill Top towards Picton
Location

Colo Vale is a former railway station which was located on the Picton – Mittagong loop railway line. It served the small town of Colo Vale, a northern village of the Southern Highlands of New South Wales, Australia.

== History ==
The station opened on 1 May 1883 as Colemans Siding, and was renamed Colo Vale on 1 August 1885. The station along with the Loop Line was closed in 1978.

The station is located on a crossing loop. It has been restored by the Colo Vale Community Association.

In 2021, an upgrade to the line from Buxton to Colo Vale was announced, with project delivery by Transport Heritage NSW. When complete this will allow return of heritage trains to Colo Vale.
