= Balmoral, New South Wales (Southern Highlands) =

Coordinates: 34°18′55″S 150°31′04″E

Balmoral
- Town
- Country: Australia
- State: New South Wales
- Region: Southern Highlands
- LGA: Wingecarribee Shire
- Location: 109 km (68 mi) SW of Sydney CBD; 13 km (8.1 mi) SW of Picton; 25 km (16 mi) NE of Mittagong

Government
  - State electorate: Wollondilly
  - Federal division: Whitlam
- Elevation: 461 m (1,512 ft)

Population
  - Total: 365 (UCL 2021)
- Postcode: 2571
- County: Camden
- Parish: Cumbertine
Localities around Balmoral
Wattle Ridge	Buxton	Bargo
Wattle Ridge	Balmoral	Yerrinbool
Hill Top	Hill Top	Hill Top

Balmoral (/bælˈmɒrəl/ bal-MORR-əl) is a Northern Village of the Southern Highlands area of New South Wales, Australia. It is the northernmost village in Wingecarribee Shire.

Balmoral Village lies mostly on the eastern side of Wilson Drive. The main street is Railway Parade. The village does not have a Post Office or shops. It has a well-maintained Village Hall, including a children's play area, and a tennis court. The village also has a NSW Rural Fire Service brigade. There is also an active Balmoral Village Association to run events and raise money for the little community.

Balmoral is formerly a station on the alignment of the Main Southern railway line, and is known variously as 'Big Hill Lower Siding' (1878), 'Bargo' (1881), and 'Balmoral' (1888). On the New South Wales Government Railways Secretariat map, the locality is identified as Balmoral Private Village. In 1919, the Picton–Mittagong Deviation opened. The Loop Line continued to operate until 1978, and is now disused. The Balmoral station building was re-erected adjacent to the old school house (built in 1893) and the Loopline Pottery is on the same property.

The town is served on weekdays by the Bowral to Picton NSW TrainLink bus service that runs to the towns served by the old Main South railway alignment, between Mittagong and Picton.

In December 2019, Balmoral was affected by the 2019–20 Australian bushfire season when it was struck twice by fires. New South Wales Premier Gladys Berejiklian claimed in a press conference that there was "not much left" of the town, which was disputed by the firefighters involved in efforts to save Balmoral. An early estimate of the damage was that 18 houses, which made up more than 10% of the town, had been destroyed in the fires.

== Population ==
At the 2021 census, 469 people were living in Balmoral.

In the 2016 census, there were 426 people in Balmoral. 82.6% of people were born in Australia and 93.9% of people spoke only English at home. The most common responses for religion in Balmoral were Anglican 30.9% and No Religion 25.8%.

== Gallery ==
Balmoral Village

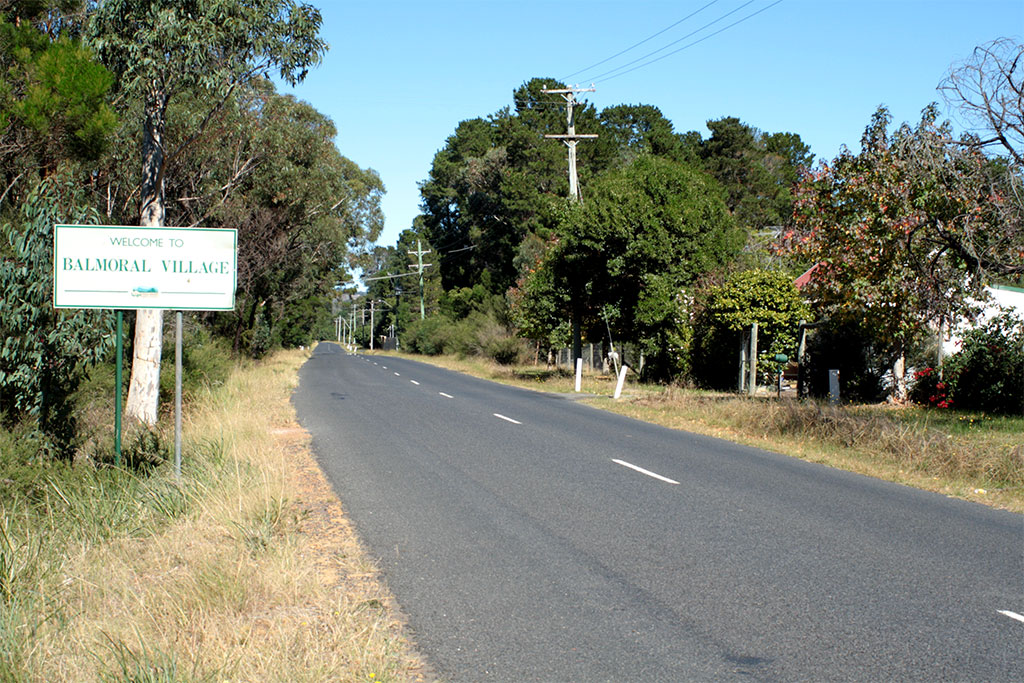

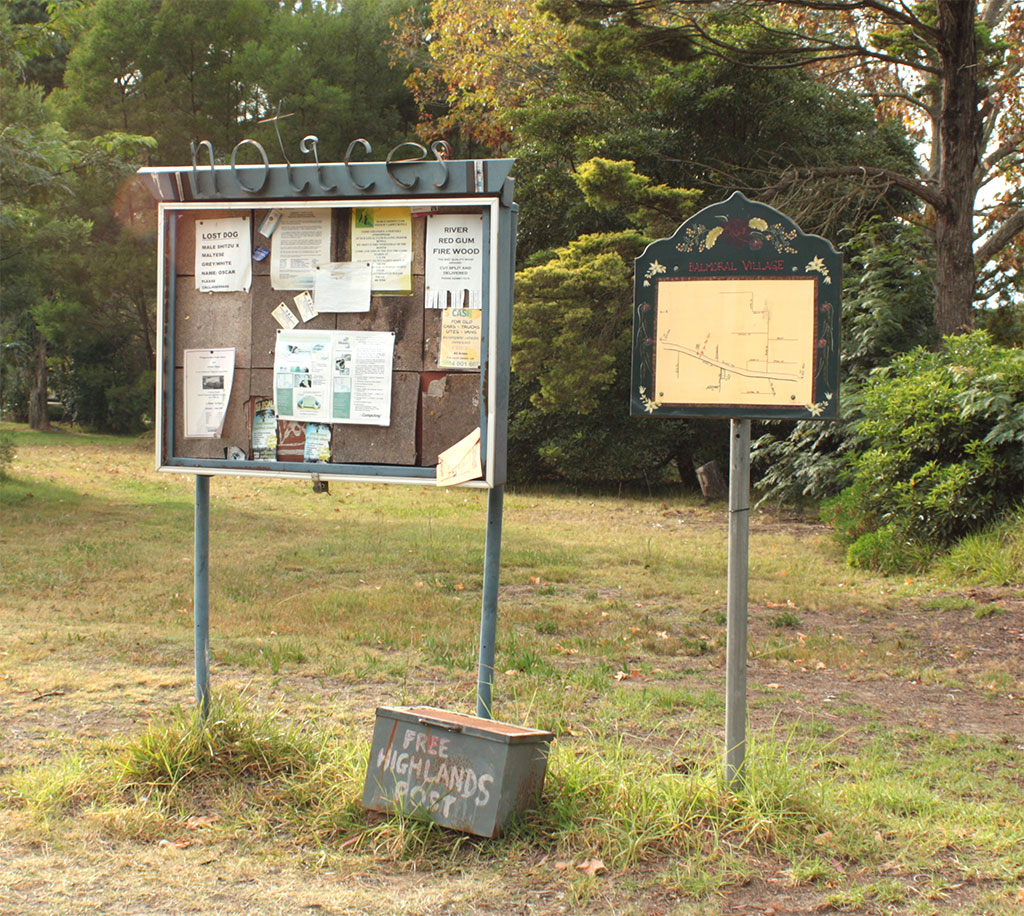

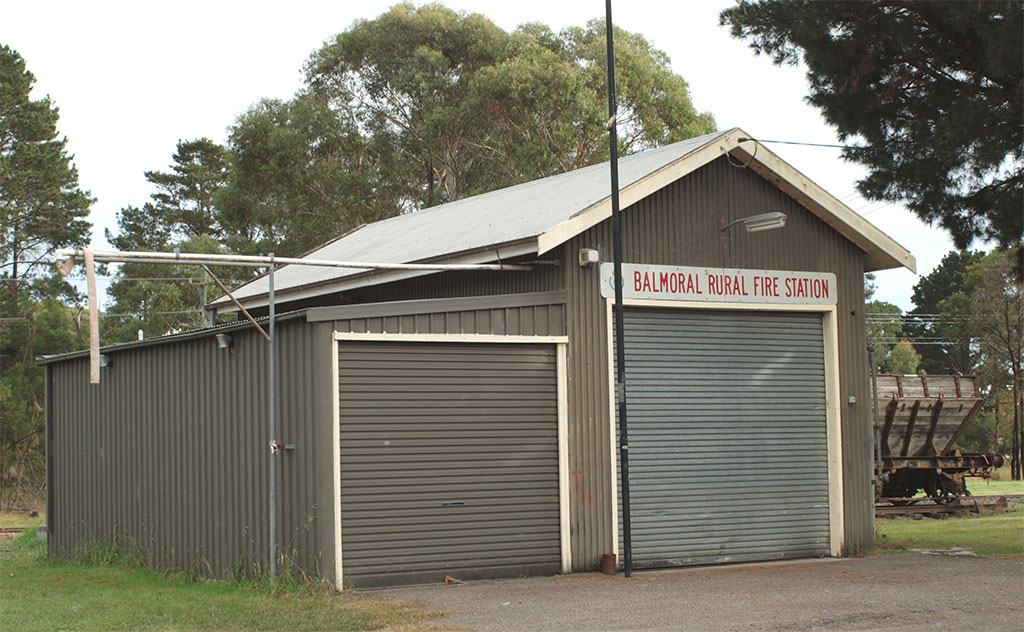

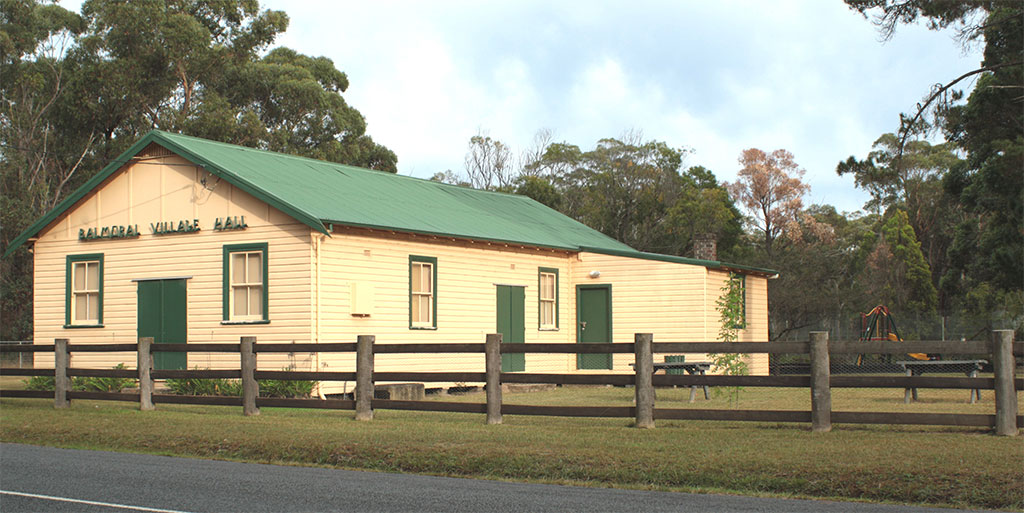

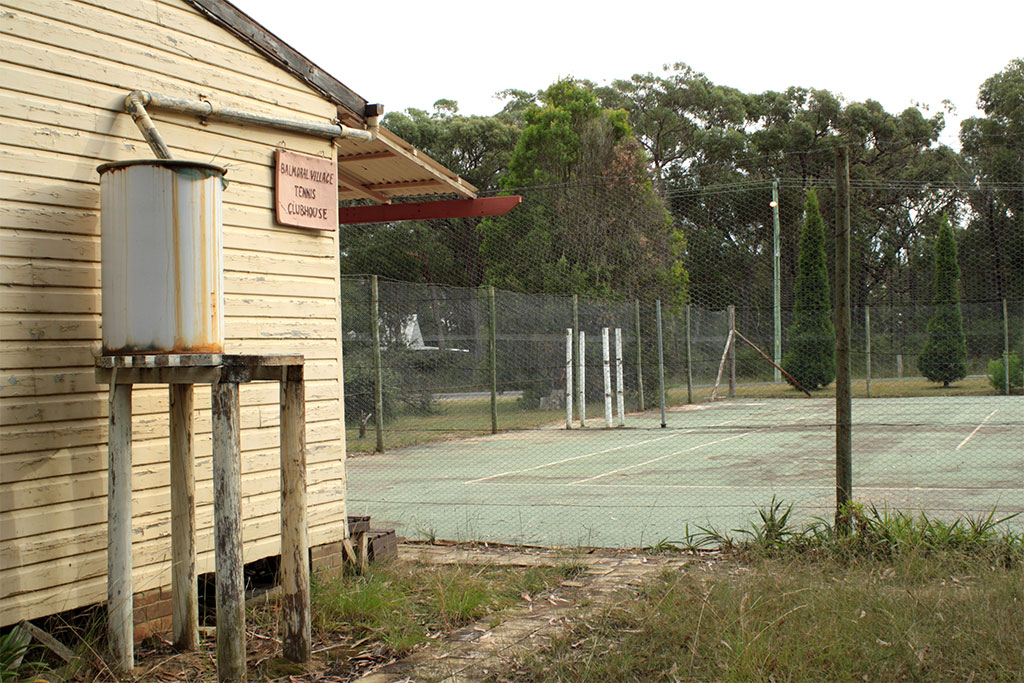

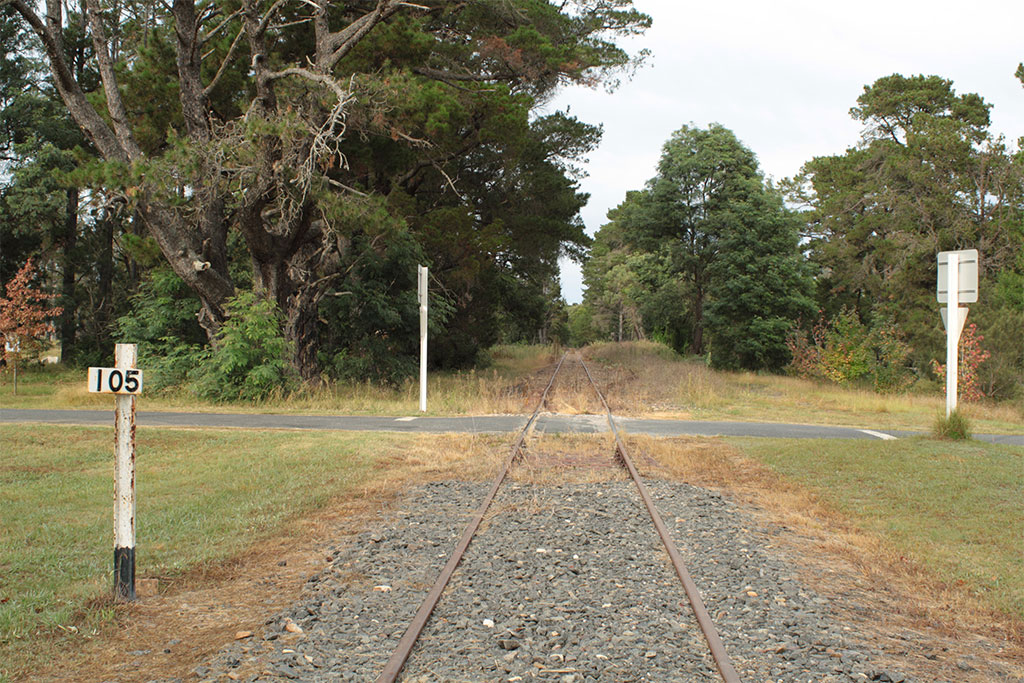
