= Balmoral railway station, New South Wales =

Former railway station in New South Wales, Australia

Balmoral
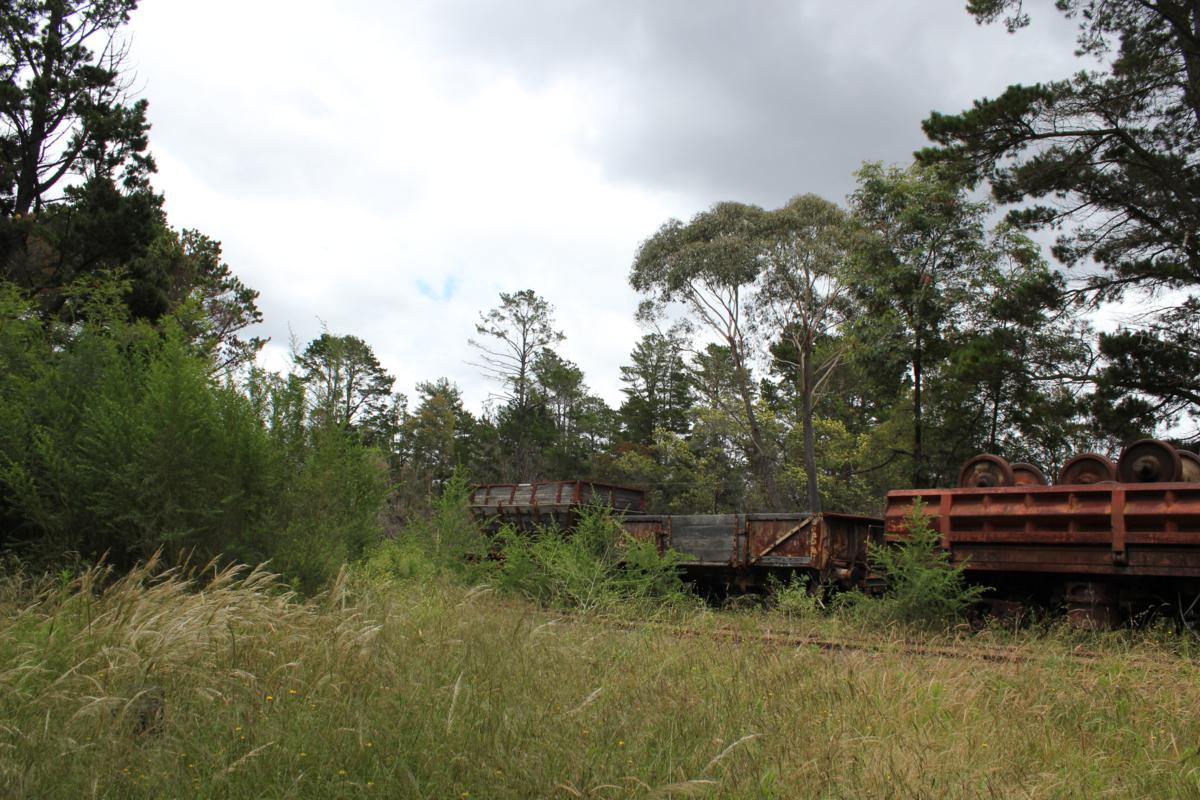
- Former site of Balmoral Station, now occupied by disused wagons

General information
- Location: Balmoral, New South Wales; Australia
- Coordinates: 34°13′58″S 150°32′59″E
- Operator: Public Transport Commission
- Lines: Picton–Mittagong loop line Main Southern
- Platforms: 1 (1 side)
- Tracks: 1

Construction
- Structure type: Ground

Other information
- Status: Demolished

History
- Opened: 15 April 1878
- Closed: 1978
- Former names: Big Hill Lower Siding (1878–1881); Bargo (1881–1888)

Services
Preceding station	Former services	Following station
Hill Top towards Mittagong	Picton–Mittagong Loop Line	Buxton towards Picton
Location

Balmoral railway station was a railway station located on the Picton–Mittagong loop line, serving the town of Balmoral in the Macarthur Region, New South Wales, Australia.

== History ==
The station opened on 2 December 1878 as Big Hill Lower Siding, was renamed Bargo in 1881, and finally Balmoral in 1888. The station along with the rest of the line was closed in 1978.

There are no remains of the station, but the Station Master’s cottage still exists and is occupied by a retired railway worker.
