= Willow Vale, New South Wales (Wingecarribee) =

Willow Vale
- Town
- Coordinates: 34°25′54″S 150°28′04″E
- Country: Australia
- State: New South Wales
- Region: Southern Highlands
- LGA: Wingecarribee Shire
- Location: 127 km (79 mi) SW of Sydney; 2 km (1.2 mi) NE of Mittagong

Government
  - State electorate: Wollondilly
  - Federal division: Whitlam
- Elevation: 610 m (2,000 ft)

Population
  - Total: 826 (SAL 2021)
- Postcode: 2575
- County: Camden
- Parish: Colo
Localities around Willow Vale
	Colo Vale	Braemar
	Willow Vale	Balaclava
Mittagong	Renwick

Willow Vale is a Northern Village of the Southern Highlands of New South Wales, Australia, in Wingecarribee Shire. It is located 2 km north of Mittagong and is often considered part of Braemar along with its neighbour Balaclava.

According to the 2016 census, Willow Vale had a population of 717. At the 2021 census, 826 people were living at Willow Vale.
