= Wattle Ridge, New South Wales =

Wattle Ridge
- Town
- Coordinates: 34°18′S 150°26′E
- Country: Australia
- State: New South Wales
- Region: Southern Highlands
- LGA: Wingecarribee Shire
- Location: 120 km (75 mi) SW of Sydney CBD; 24 km (15 mi) N of Mittagong

Government
  - State electorate: Wollondilly
  - Federal division: Whitlam
- Elevation: 587 m (1,926 ft)

Population
  - Total: 0 (SAL 2021)
- Postcode: 2575
- County: Camden
- Parish: Cumbertine
Localities around Wattle Ridge
	Buxton
Wattle Ridge	Balmoral
	Hill Top

Wattle Ridge is a locality in the Southern Highlands of New South Wales, Australia, in Wingecarribee Shire. It is located near Buxton and Balmoral.

According to the 2016 census, it had a population of 4. At the 2021 census, no people were recorded as residents of Wattle Ridge.
