= Balaclava, New South Wales =

Balaclava
- Town
- Coordinates: 34°26′21″S 150°28′19″E
- Country: Australia
- State: New South Wales
- Region: Southern Highlands
- LGA: Wingecarribee Shire
- Location: 128 km (80 mi) SW of Sydney CBD; 1.5 km (0.93 mi) NE of Mittagong

Government
  - State electorate: Goulburn
  - Federal division: Whitlam
- Elevation: 613 m (2,011 ft)

Population
  - Total: 574 (SAL 2021)
- Postcode: 2575
- County: Camden
- Parish: Mittagong
Localities around Balaclava
Willow Vale	Braemar	Braemar
Mittagong	Balaclava
Mittagong	Renwick

Balaclava (/ˈbæləˌklɑːvə/) is a Northern Village of the Southern Highlands of New South Wales, Australia in Wingecarribee Shire. It is 1 km north-east of Mittagong. The village includes a service station, real estate, pre-school, nursery, doctor's surgery and antiques store. It is located in Wingecarribee Shire and is often considered part of Braemar along with its neighbour Willow Vale.

== Population ==
According to the 2021 census, there were 574 people living at Balaclava. At the 2016 census, Balaclava had a population of 496.
