= Braemar, New South Wales =

Braemar
- Town
- Coordinates: 34°25′52″S 150°28′59″E
- Country: Australia
- State: New South Wales
- Region: Southern Highlands
- LGA: Wingecarribee Shire
- Location: 124 km (77 mi) south-west of Sydney CBD; 5 km (3.1 mi) north-east of Mittagong

Government
  - State electorate: Wollondilly
  - Federal division: Whitlam
- Elevation: 598 m (1,962 ft)

Population
  - Total: 966 (SAL 2021)
- Postcode: 2575
- County: Camden
- Parish: Colo, Mittagong
Localities around Braemar
Colo Vale	Aylmerton
Willow Vale	Braemar	Aylmerton
	Balaclava

Braemar (/ˈbreɪmɑːr/) is a northern village of the Southern Highlands of New South Wales, Australia in Wingecarribee Shire. It is located two km north-east of Mittagong and is often considered to include the hamlet villages of Balaclava and Willow Vale.

== History ==
Braemar had a passenger train station on the Picton Loop railway line, which opened as Rushs Platform on 1 March 1867. In 1892 it was renamed Braemar to coincide with the renaming of the village. On 5 August 1978, the station was closed to passenger services. At present, the station only services a concrete sleeper supplier and the company Clyde Engineering.

== Population ==
At the 2016 census, there were 447 people living at Braemar. At the 2021 census, the population of Braemar had increased to 966.
