= Northern Villages (Southern Highlands, New South Wales) =

Northern Villages is the name that refers to the small villages and hamlets that make up the north of the Southern Highlands and Wingecarribee Shire. All are north of Mittagong. Historically, many either are on the Old Hume Highway or the old Picton Loop Line. In the past they were referred to as the Northern Towns. All of the Northern Villages made up the previous Mittagong (Nattai) Shire.

The postcode for the Northern Villages is the same as Mittagong: 2575. However, Balmoral has the postcode of 2571.

== Villages ==
The villages include:

- Alpine (Population: 135) Australian Bureau of Statistics 2016 Census
- Aylmerton Population:194
- Balmoral (Population: 785)
- Braemar (Population: 1189) which encompasses the smaller villages of:
  - Balaclava
  - Willow Vale
- Colo Vale (Population: 1618)
- Hill Top (Population: 2674)
- Yerrinbool (Population: 1164)

== History ==
Hill Top, Colo Vale, Willow Vale, Balmoral as well as Braemar are located on the historical Picton Loop Line which used to be part of the Main Southern railway line but became a separate line in 1919 upon the building of a new alignment for the main line ( see Southern Highlands railway line ). The Loop line and stations are still intact. The northern section of the line is used by Thirmere's Railway Museum for the museum's antique steam trains, while the remainder of the line is now disused.

The new line that was opened in 1919 was built a few kilometres east into the villages of Yerrinbool, Alpine, Aylmerton and Balaclava. This line is still in use but Yerrinbool is the only Northern Village to retain an open railway station.

Braemar and its surrounding villages are also located on the historic Old Hume Highway along with Yerrinbool, Alpine and Aylmerton until the construction of the current Hume Highway in the 1980s.

== National Parks ==
Hill Top, Balmoral, Yerrinbool, Colo Vale and parts of Braemar are surrounded by the Nattai National Park and small reservations that make up the national park the Bargo State Conservation Area and Jellore State Forest.

== Development ==
The Northern Villages mostly serve as residential areas with small commercial businesses such as general stores. However, recently Braemar (because of its growth is now considered part of Mittagong) has grown commercially and industrially with businesses taking advantage of zoned areas in the North of Braemar. This is because Braemar is next to railway and is close to the Hume Highway and its ramps.
