= Hill Top, New South Wales =

Hill Top
- Town
- Coordinates: 34°21′S 150°29′E
- Country: Australia
- State: New South Wales
- Region: Southern Highlands
- LGA: Wingecarribee Shire
- Location: 115 km (71 mi) SW of Sydney CBD; 17 km (11 mi) N of Mittagong
- Established: 1916

Government
  - State electorate: Wollondilly
  - Federal division: Whitlam
- Elevation: 629 m (2,064 ft)

Population
  - Total: 2,262 (UCL 2021)
- Postcode: 2575
- County: Camden
- Parish: Cumbertine
Localities around Hill Top
	Balmoral
Nattai National Park	Hill Top	Yerrinbool
	Colo Vale

Hill Top is a Northern Village of the Southern Highlands of New South Wales, Australia, in Wingecarribee Shire. Previous names of the village include Hilltop and Jellore. It is a 17 km drive to Mittagong and around 10 km drive to the Hume Highway via Colo Vale. It is roughly 6–8 km to Yerrinbool as the crow flies.

== History ==
It was formerly on the Main Southern Railway, until that line was deviated in 1919 to a less steep alignment with easier grades. The original line became the Picton Loop line, which closed in 1978. The remains of Hill Top station platform can still be seen.

== Facilities ==
Hill Top has commercial facilities such as a pizzeria, bakery, chemist, general store, liquor store, real estate agent, and GP's surgery.

Community facilities include a post office, tennis courts, sporting fields, day-care centre, primary school, fire station, church and community hall.

It is home to the Southern Highlands Rifle Club's shooting range. In 2007, controversially, it was proposed that this range be extended 10 square kilometres on Crown Land near Hill Top into the Southern Highlands Regional Shooting Complex upon the government-proposed closure of the large ANZAC Rifle Range at Malabar Heads. However, it was met by strong opposition by local residents and councillors who were concerned about the noise, traffic and environmental effects it might have on the area due to the proposed complex being in close proximity to the residential area and water catchment area of Hill Top. The Southern Highlands News interviewed National Parks Association Chairman, Tony Hill who said that the range would create 'a toxic legacy that will go on for hundreds of years, .'

Hill Top has a soccer team known as the Hill Top Kookaburras which was founded in 1981. The team is a member of the Highlands Soccer Association and plays in the Highlands Competition.

Hill Top has a cricket club known as Hill Top Northern Villages Cricket Club. The club was founded in 1947 to 1952, then reformed from 1979 to 1986 and then reformed again in 1987.

== Population ==
According to the 2016 census, there were 2,674 people living at Hill Top. At the 2021 census, the population was 2,792.

== Photo gallery ==
Hill Top Images

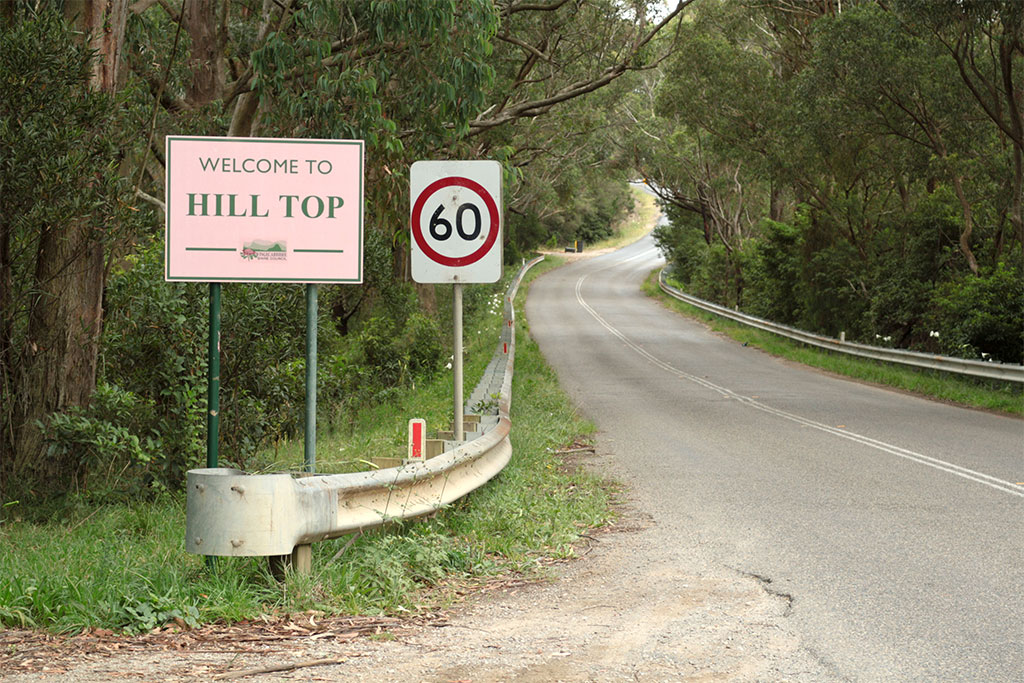
Town entry sign, Wilson Drive

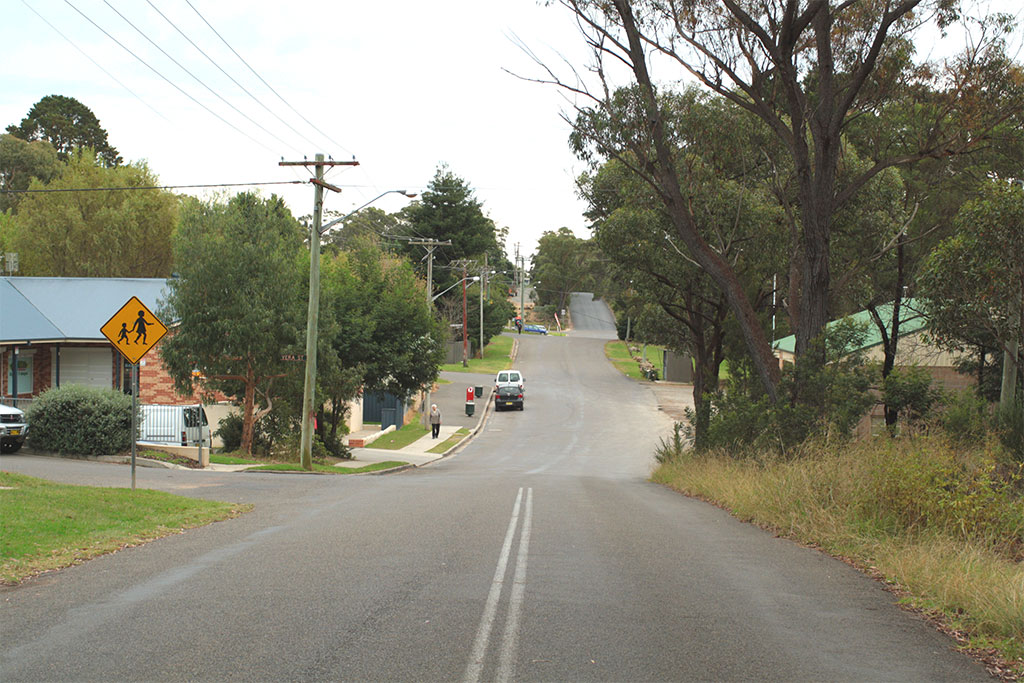
Shopping precinct

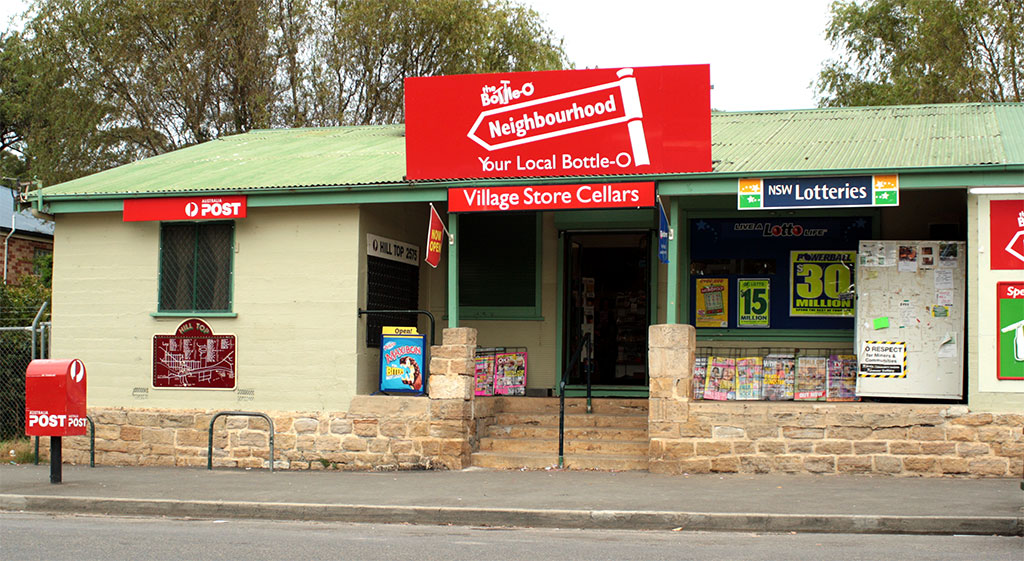
Post Office and General Store

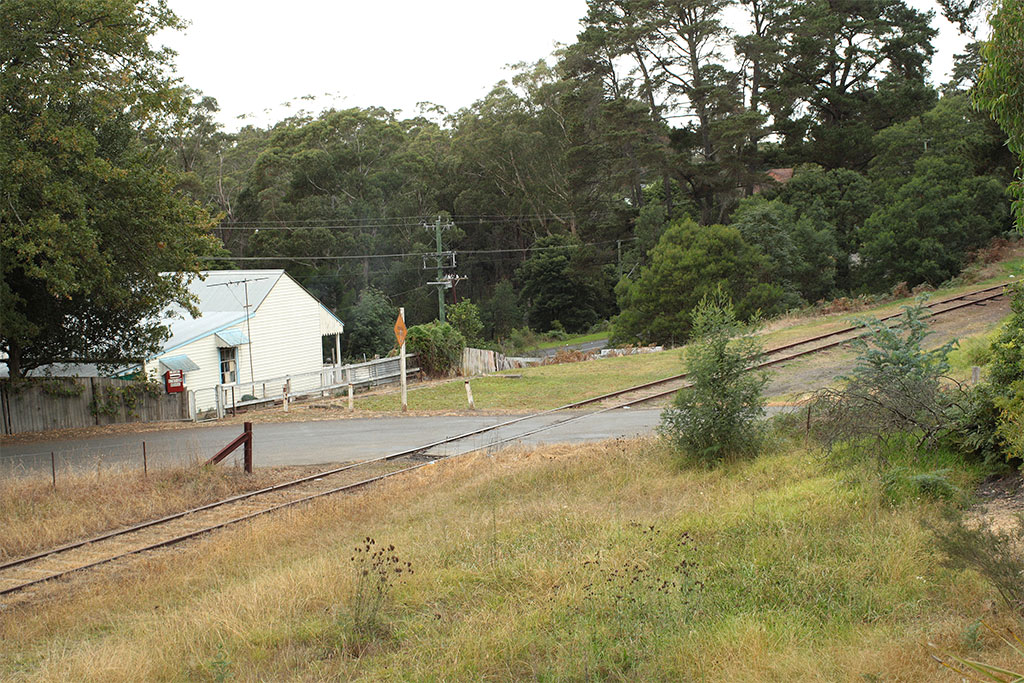
Crossing over disused railway

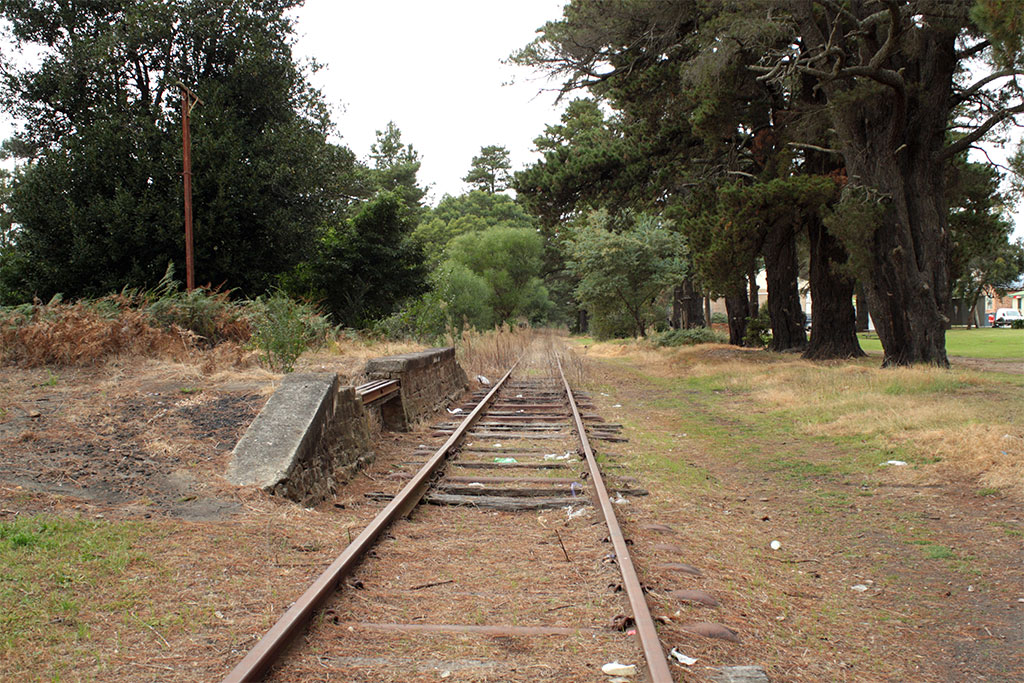
Former station platform

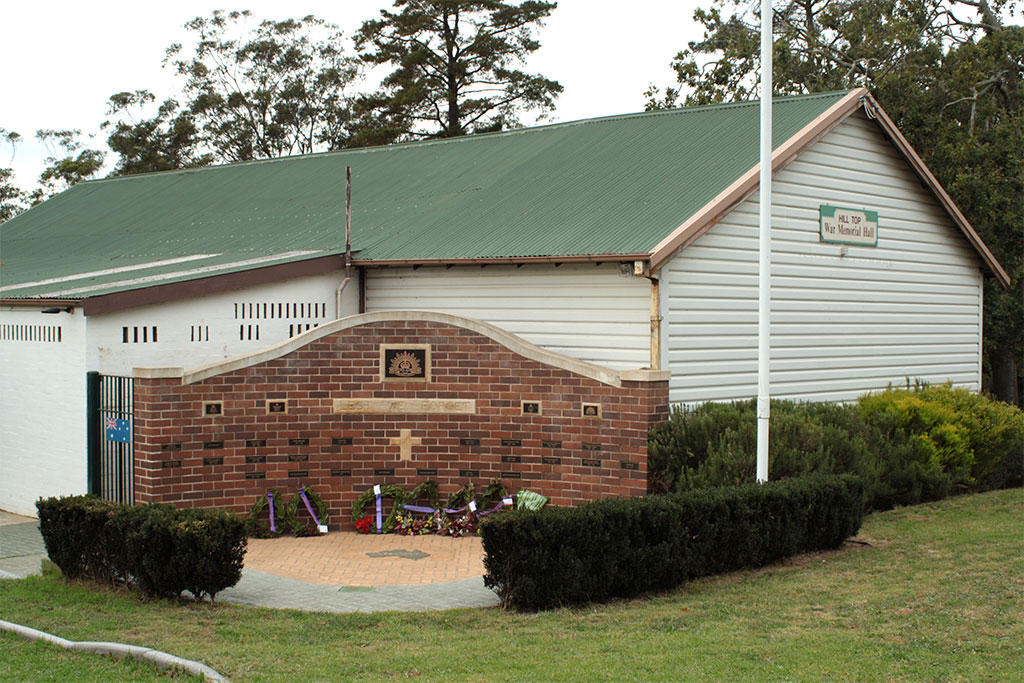
War Memorial Hall

== Bibliography ==
- Bayley, W. A. 1973 Picton-Mittagong Loop-Line Railway. pp. 26–27 Bulli: Austrail. ISBN 0-909597-14-6
- Bayley, W. A. 1975. Picton-Mittagong Main Line Railway. p. 17–18 Bulli: Austrail. ISBN 0-909597-15-4
