= Picton–Mittagong loop railway line =

Railway line in New South Wales, Australia

Picton–Mittagong Loop Line
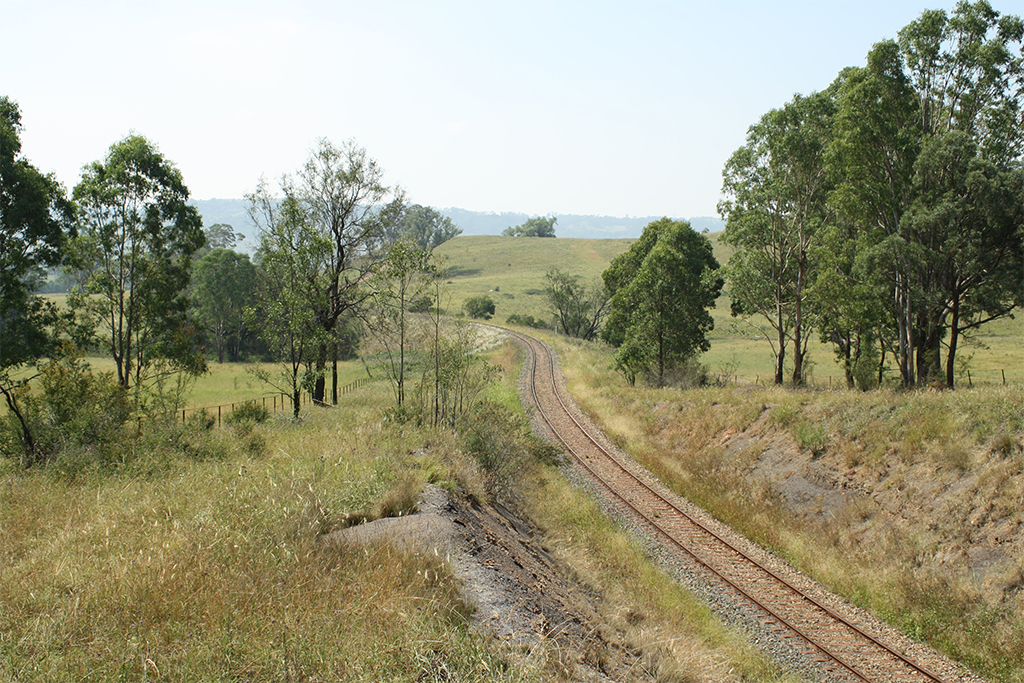
- The line between Picton and Thirlmere.

Overview
- Status: Heritage operation; partially disused
- Owner: Transport Asset Manager of New South Wales
- Locale: Southern Highlands
- Termini: Picton; Mittagong
- Stations: 9

Service
- Operator: Transport Heritage NSW

History
- Opened: February 1867

Technical
- Track gauge: 4 ft 8 1/2 in (1,435 mm)

The Picton–Mittagong Loop Line is a partly disused railway line between the towns of Picton and Mittagong in the Southern Highlands of New South Wales, Australia.

== History ==
The Picton–Mittagong line was opened in February 1867 as part of the Main South line.

The line ran north-northwest from Picton, over the Picton Viaduct, across the Great South Road before heading northwest through a 180-metre (590 ft) tunnel in the Redbank Range. The track then turns southwest.

Stations were constructed at Redbank (1885), Couridjah (1867), Buxton (1893), Balmoral (1878), Hill Top (1878), Colo Vale (1883) and Braemar (1867). There were a number of smaller stops, sidings and passing loops along the line, as well. North of Hill Top, the cutting through Big Hill was for many years the deepest in Australia. The rock-cut inscription dated 1863, commemorating the deaths of two men in an explosion during the excavation of the cutting, north of Hill Top, is considered one of the oldest in Australia.

To service the line, Picton became a busy station with a locomotive depot for bank engines, dormitories for train crews, and goods sidings.

The line, while gently curved, had gradients as steep as 1 in 30. It was also a single-track line, and even though deviations were constructed between Hill Top and Colo Vale to ease grades, these factors combined to create a bottleneck, as rail traffic increased. In July 1919 a new double track alignment with ruling 1 in 75 grades between Picton and Mittagong via Bargo opened. The original proposal was for the line to be shifted considerably further eastwards from Appin to Bargo avoiding Picton. This was strongly opposed in Parliament by Picton local interests, hence the nearly circular curve just after Picton station surrounding the now defunct Redbank Tunnel. The old line, now renamed the Loop Line, continued to be served by passenger services until August 1978. Most services were operated by 30 class locomotives and later CPH railmotors, although there was a Sunday evening service to Sydney hauled by main line locomotives as recently as 1973.

From the 1960s the line was popular with steam hauled specials, and was the preferred route for most journeys where they could operate without inhibiting regular services.

Following it relocating to Thirlmere, in June 1976 the New South Wales Rail Transport Museum (NSW Rail Museum) commenced operating steam services on the line between Picton and Buxton.

The line remained open throughout, although by the 1980s the Buxton to Braemar section saw little use. CPH railmotor CPH22 ran a trip to Braemar and three shuttles between Braemar and Hilltop on 31 May 1987, before a trestle bridge between Colo Vale and Braemar suffered flood damage, resulting in the line being divided into two separate branches in September 1987.

Following the Department for Transport calling for expressions of interest for using a number of disused lines, the New South Wales Rail Transport Museum was granted a lease over the Picton to Buxton section in 1993.

The Mittagong Junction to Braemar section remains open to give access to the Bradken rolling stock and Rocla concrete sleeper facilities.

On 1 March 2019, the NSW Government promised to fund the re-opening of the Picton Loop Line between Buxton and Colo Vale. As part of the project, a new station is proposed between Picton and Thirlmere. The grant will also fund the construction of new platforms at Picton, Hill Top and Balmoral.

=== Coach route ===
NSW TrainLink operates buses in lieu of the former rail service. Six services are provided under contract by Berrima Buslines from Bowral and seven from Picton on weekdays only with stops at:

- Picton station
- Barbour Road, Thirlmere
- West Parade, Couridjah
- West Parade, Buxton
- Wilson Drive, Balmoral
- Wilson Drive, Hill Top
- Wilson Drive & Church Avenue, Colo Vale
- Mittagong station
- Bowral station

== Gallery ==
Existing features and infrastructure

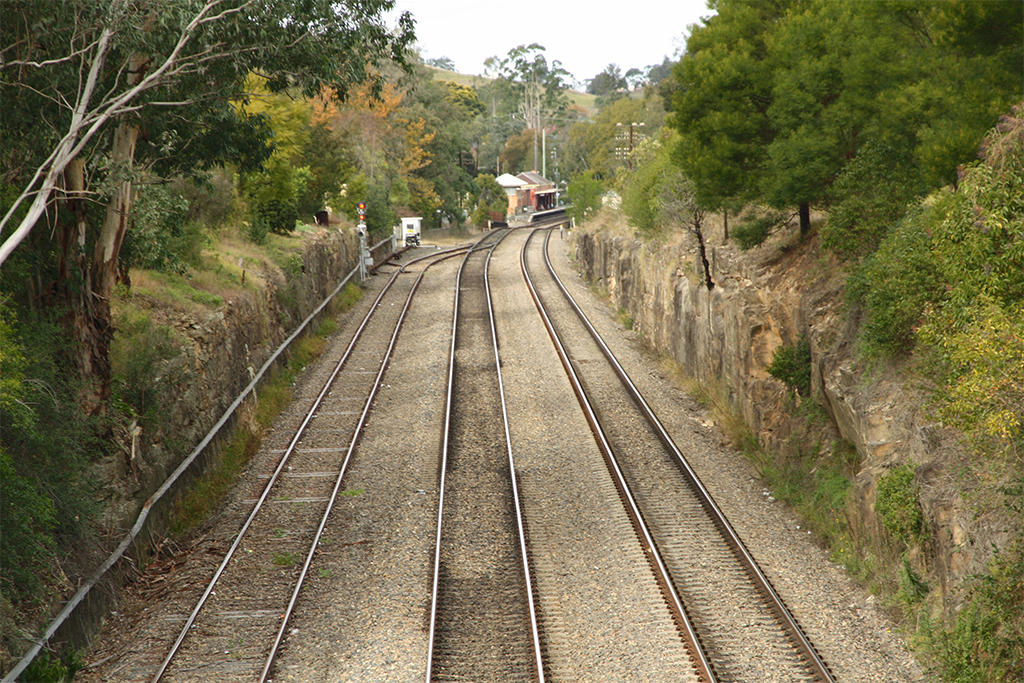
Approach to Picton station with loop line on the left

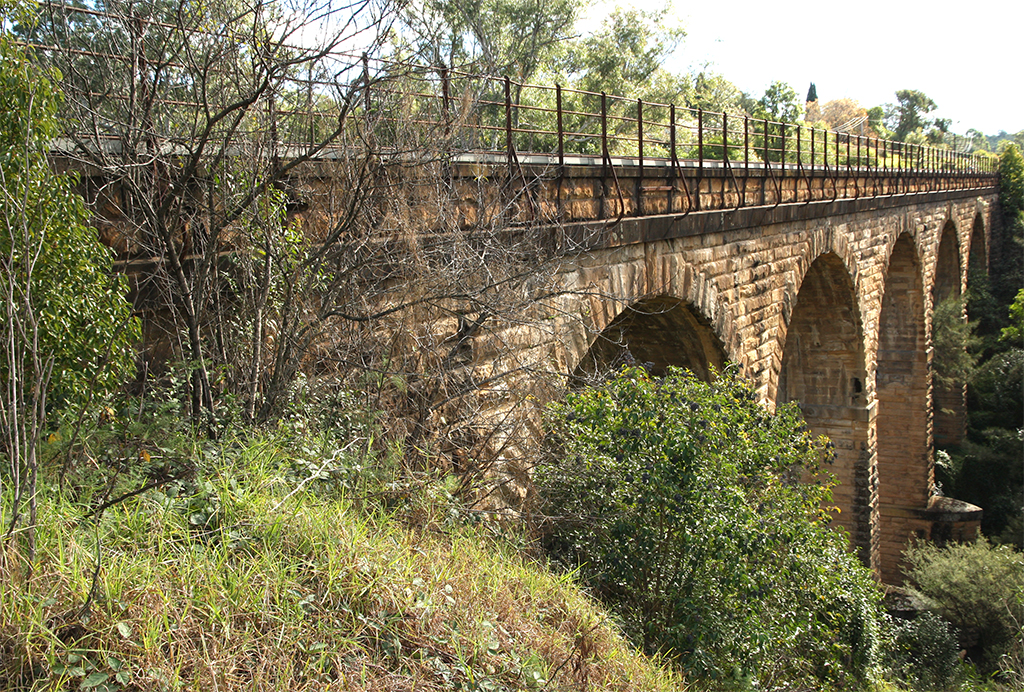
Viaduct over Stonequarry Creek, Picton

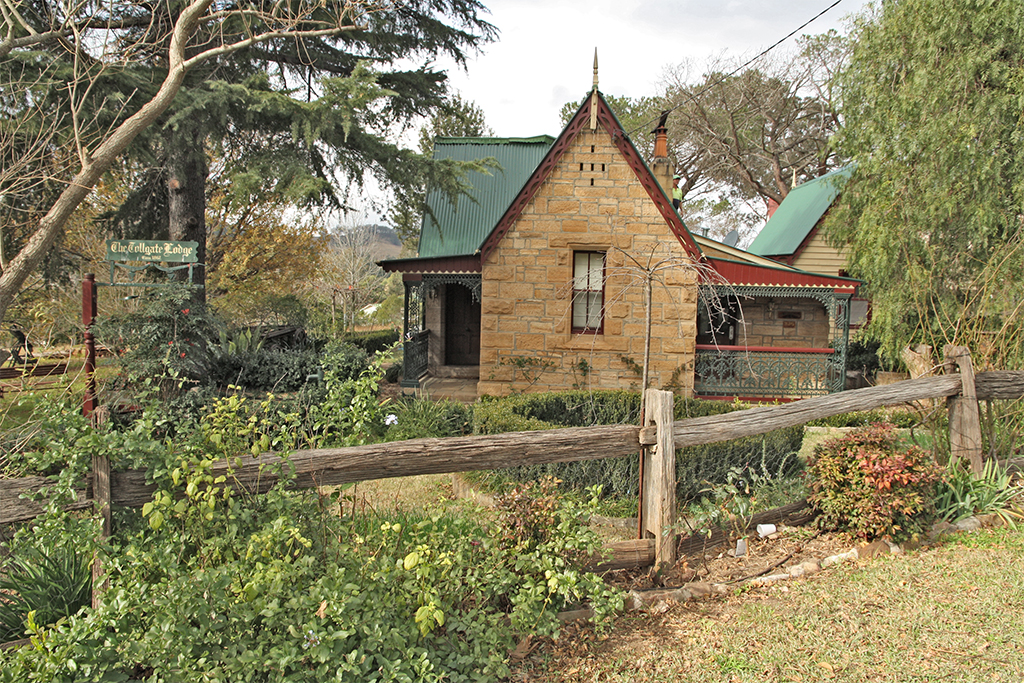
Gatekeeper's cottage, Picton

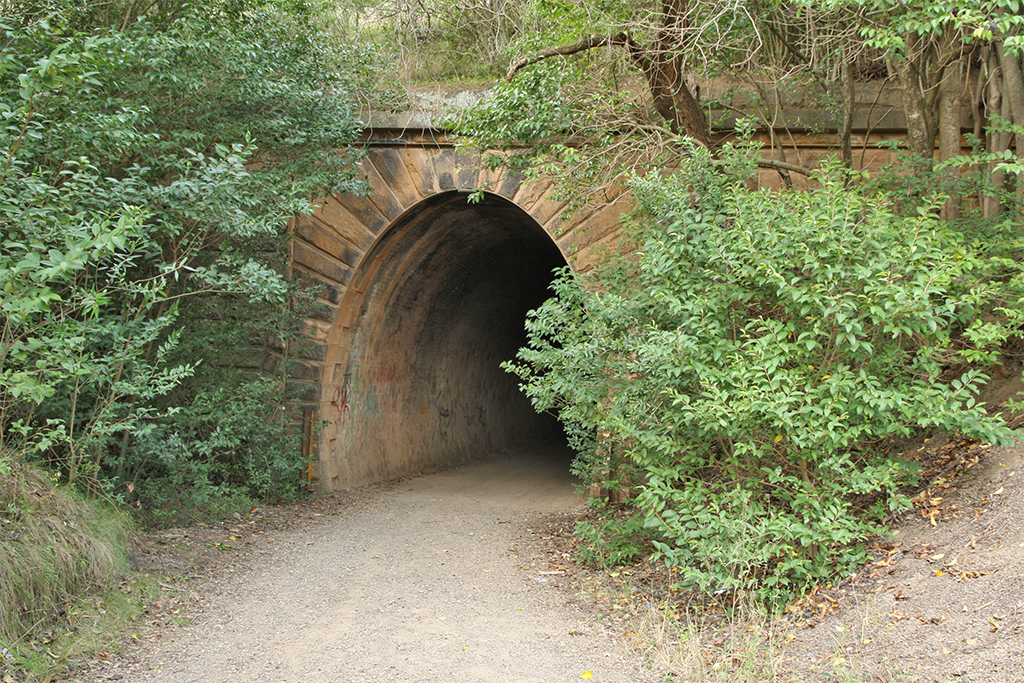
Tunnel through Redbank Range

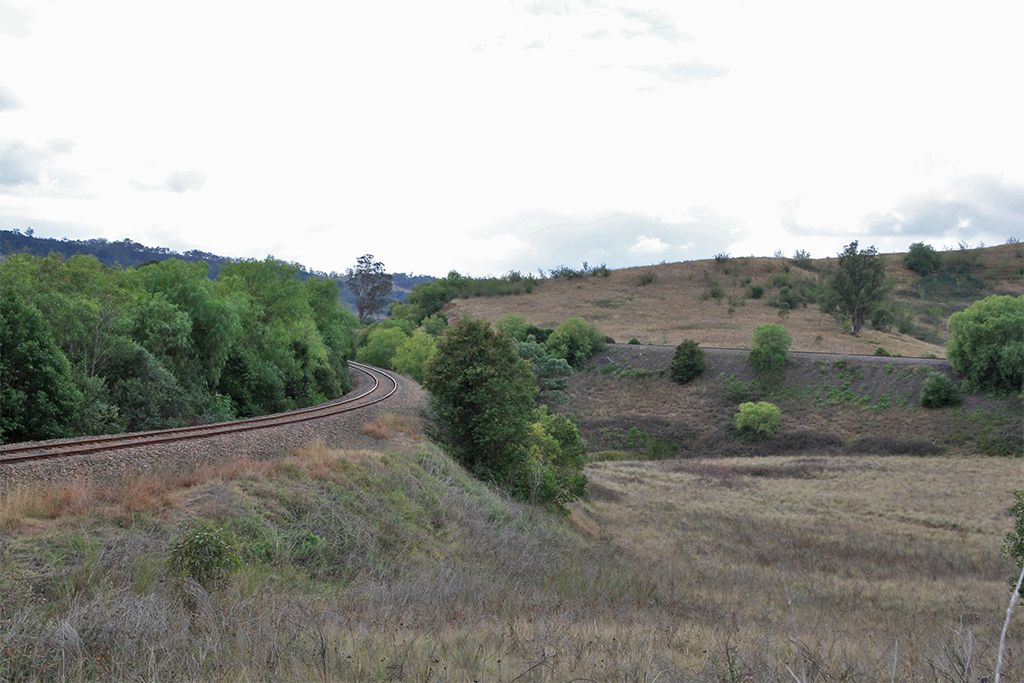
Looking north with Loop Line on left, 1919 deviation on right

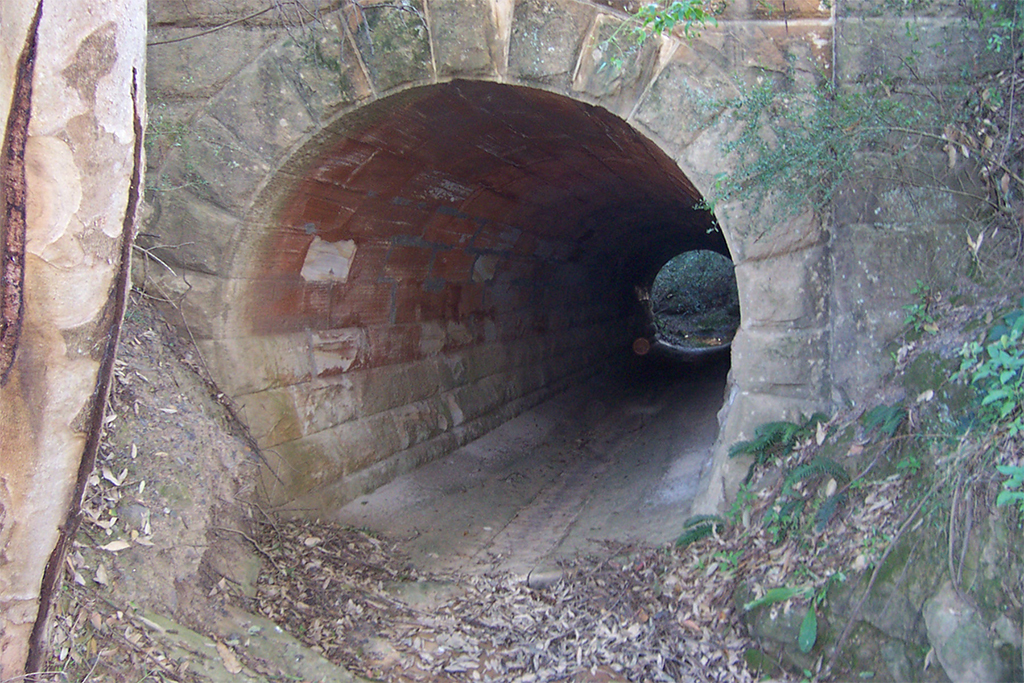
Culvert near Redbank

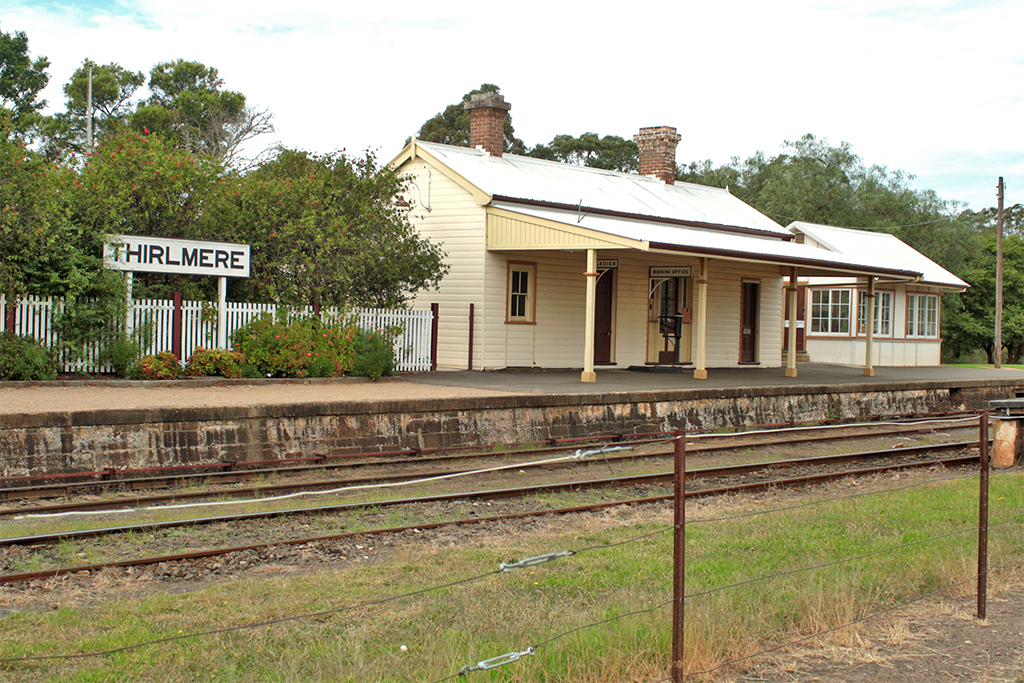
Thirlmere station

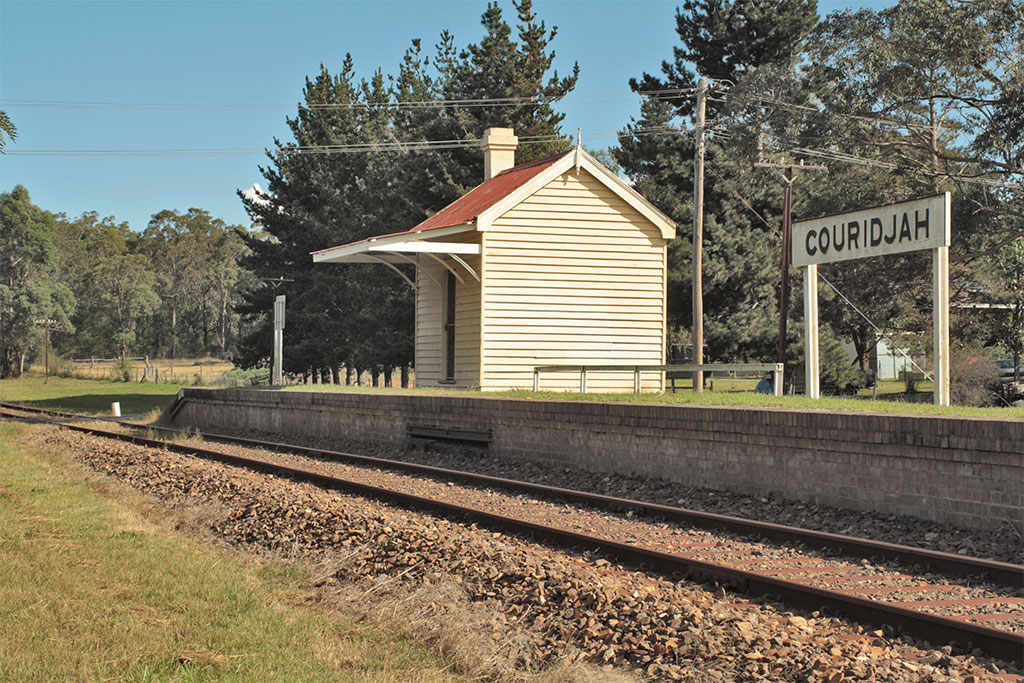
Couridjah station

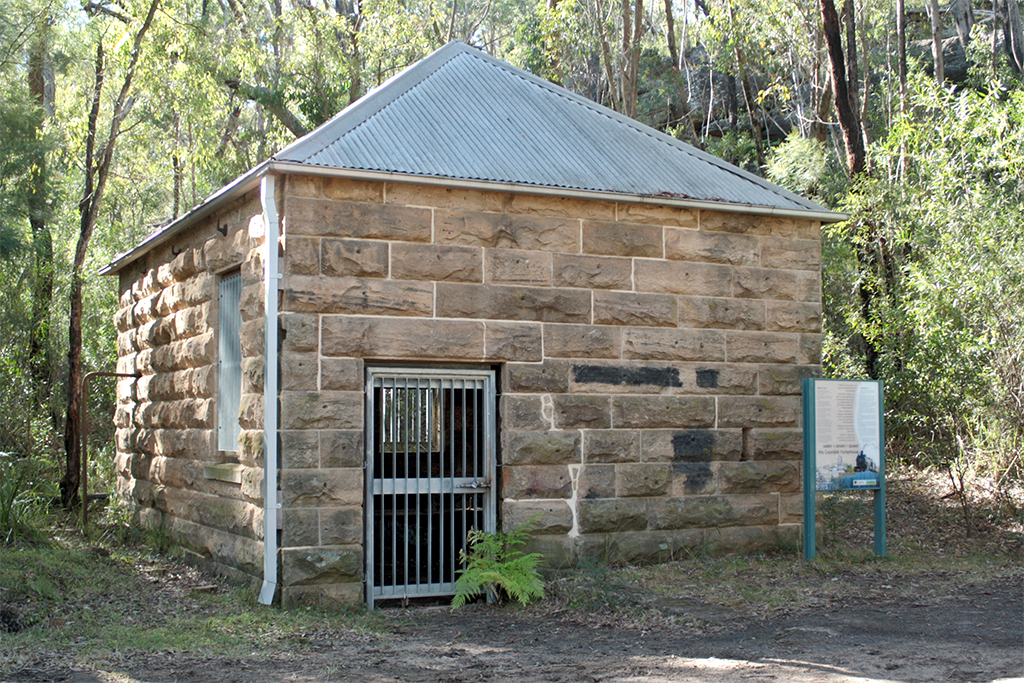
Former pumphouse near Couridjah station

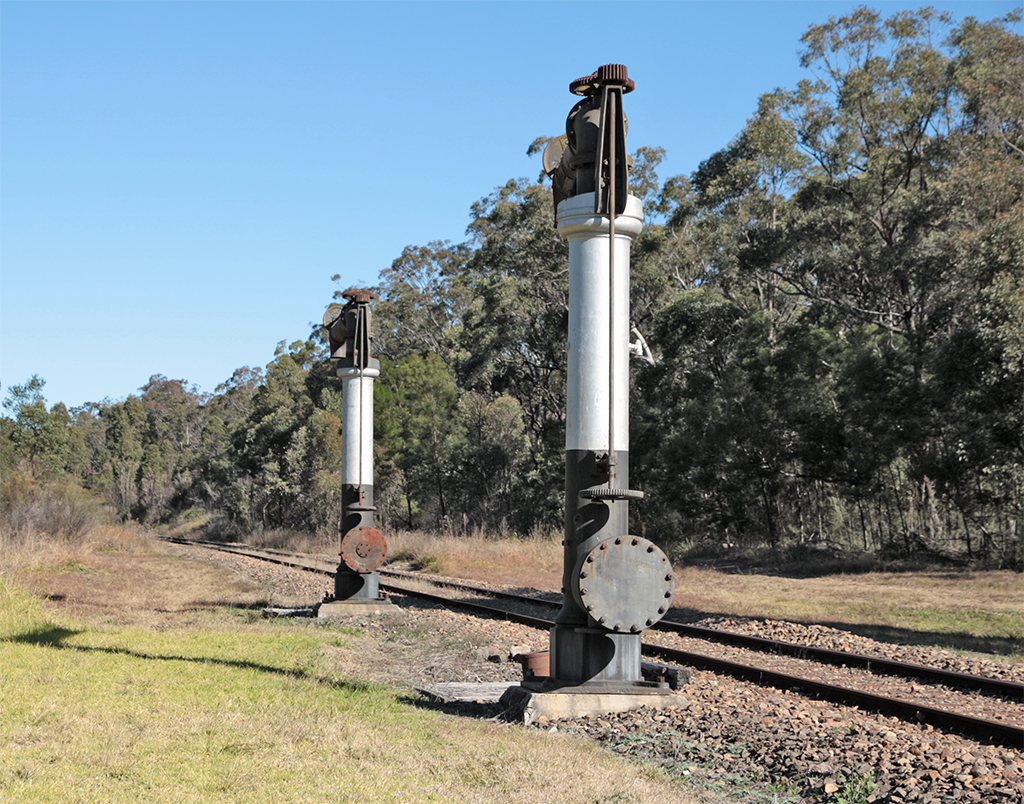
Standpipes near Couridjah station

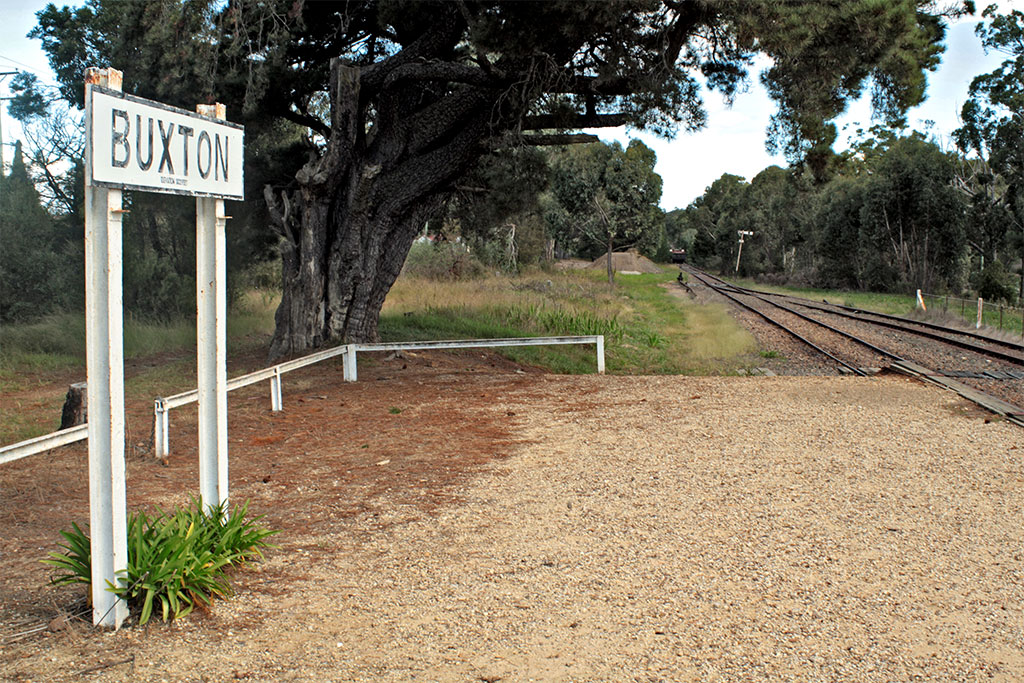
Buxton station

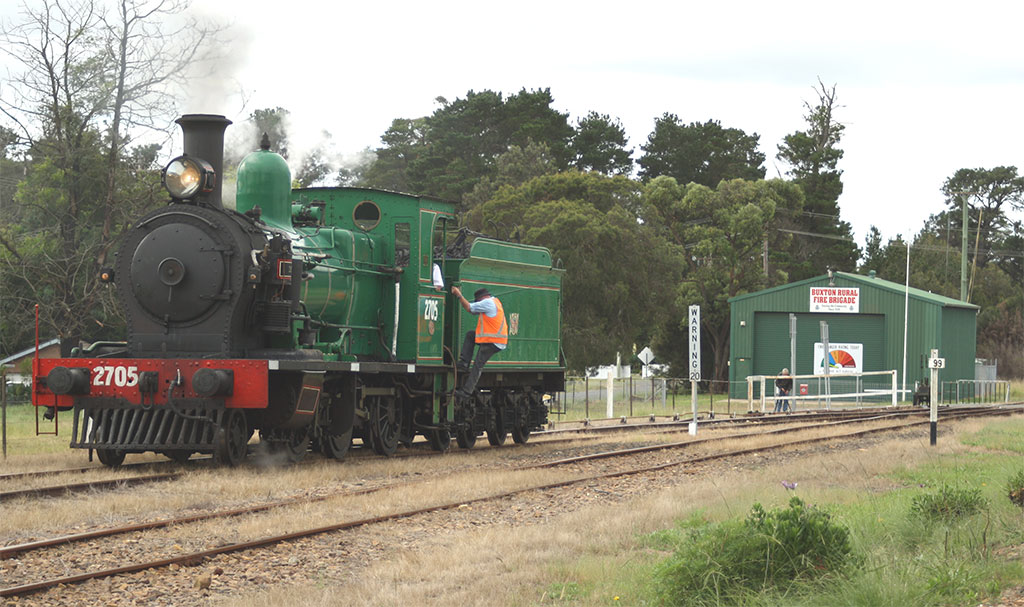
NSWRTM's 2705 at Buxton station

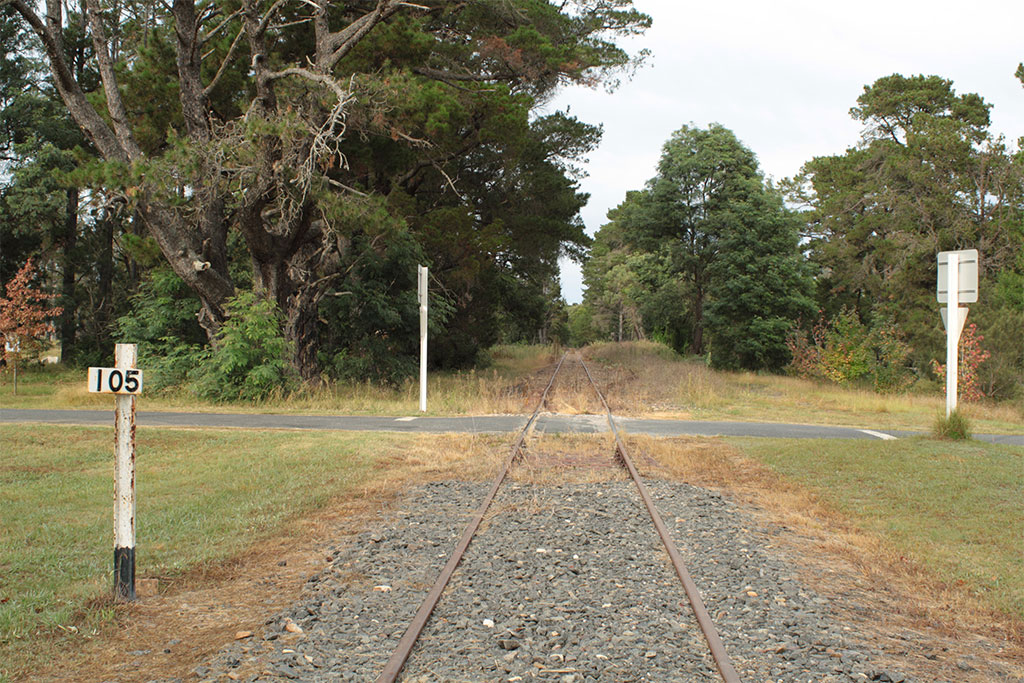
Balmoral station

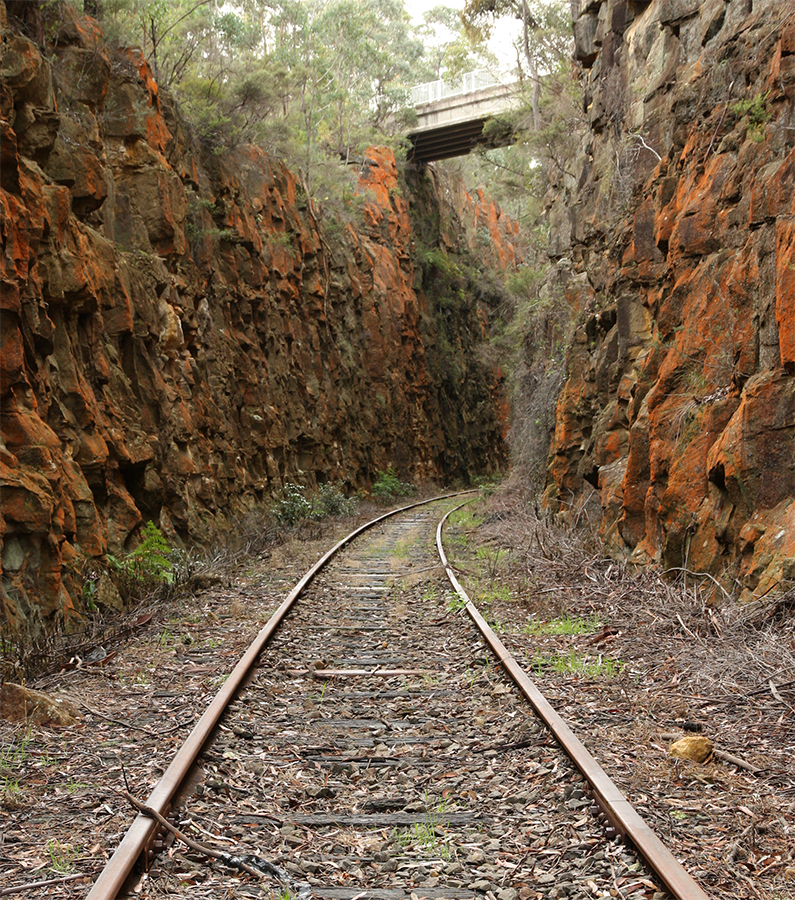
Big Hill cutting north of Hill Top

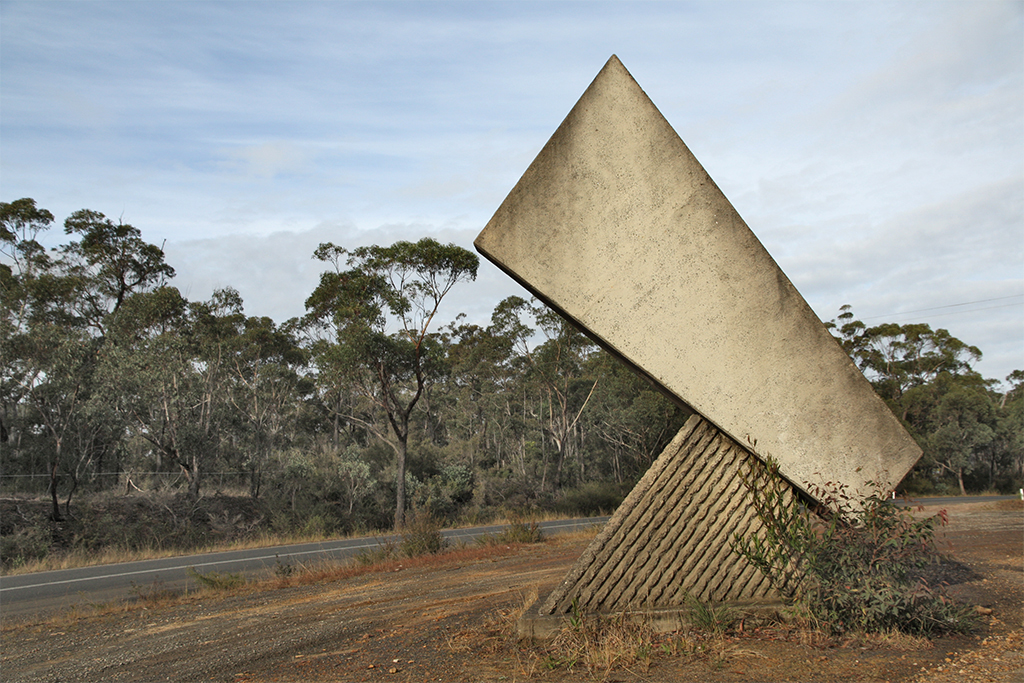
Monument to Human Endeavour near Big Hill cutting

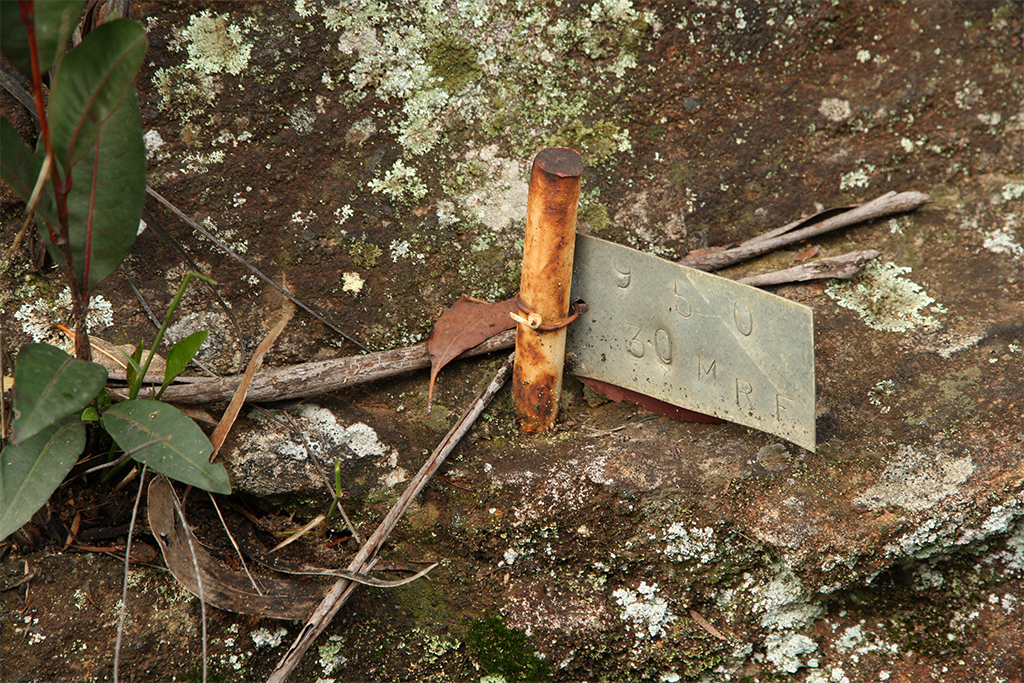
Survey peg, in Big Hill cutting

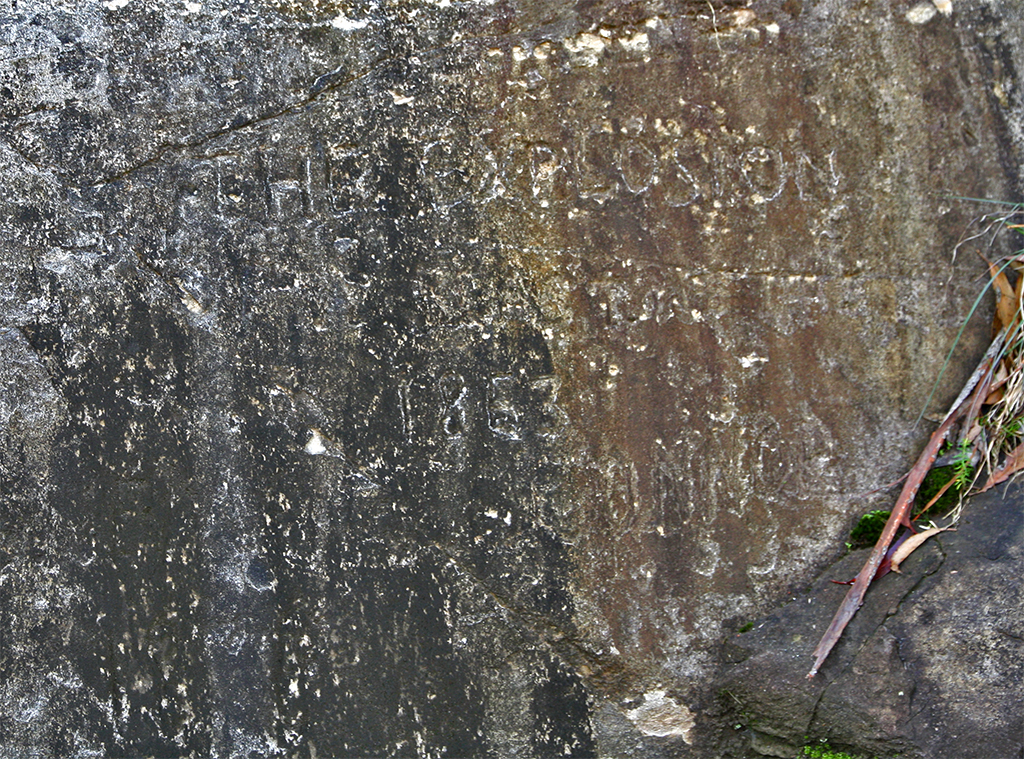
Inscription commemorating deaths of workers from explosion, 1863

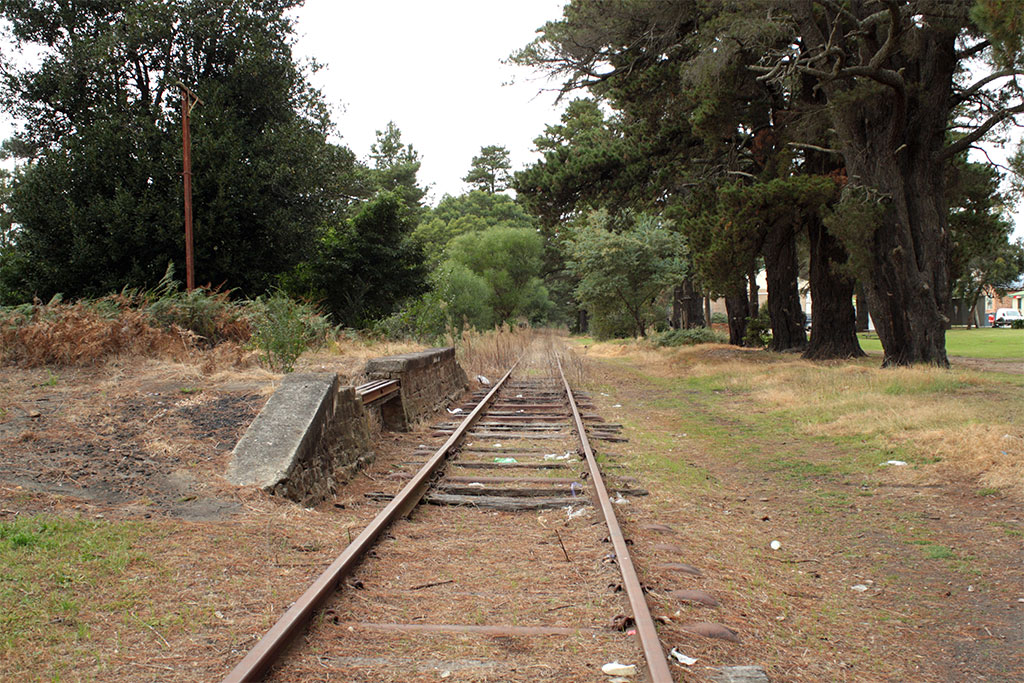
Hill Top station

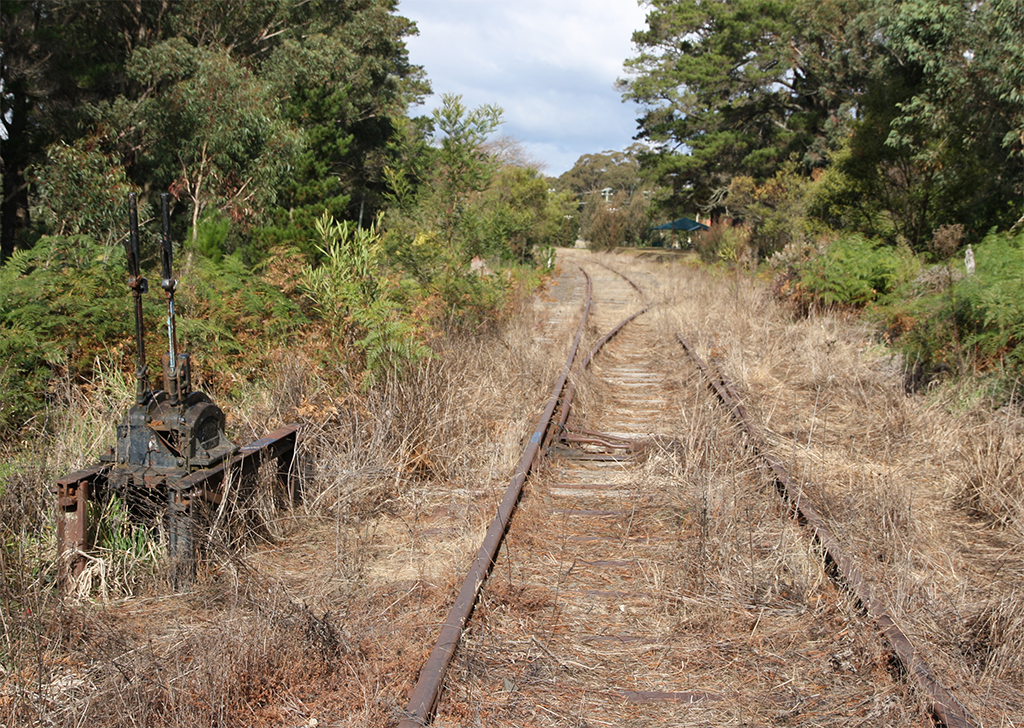
Passing loop points, Colo Vale station

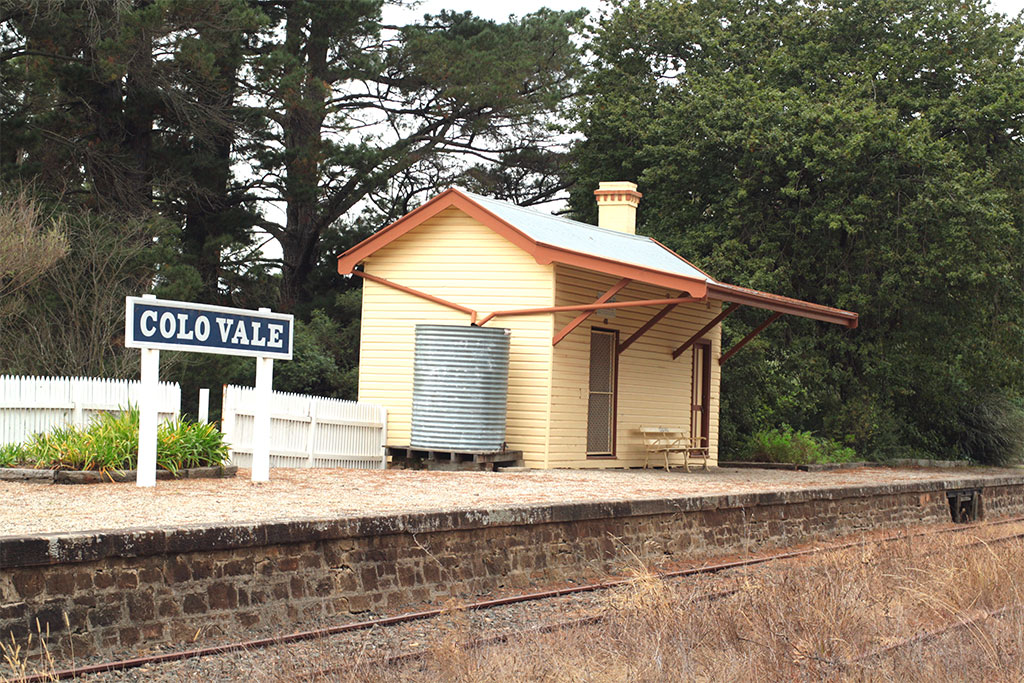
Colo Vale station

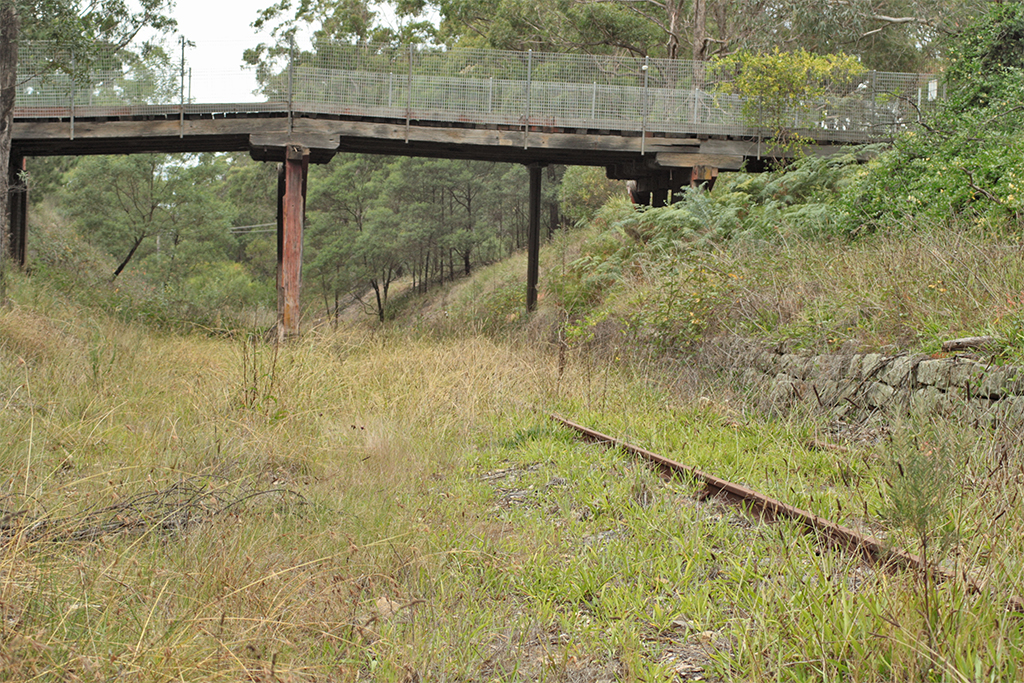
Colo Vale Road underbridge

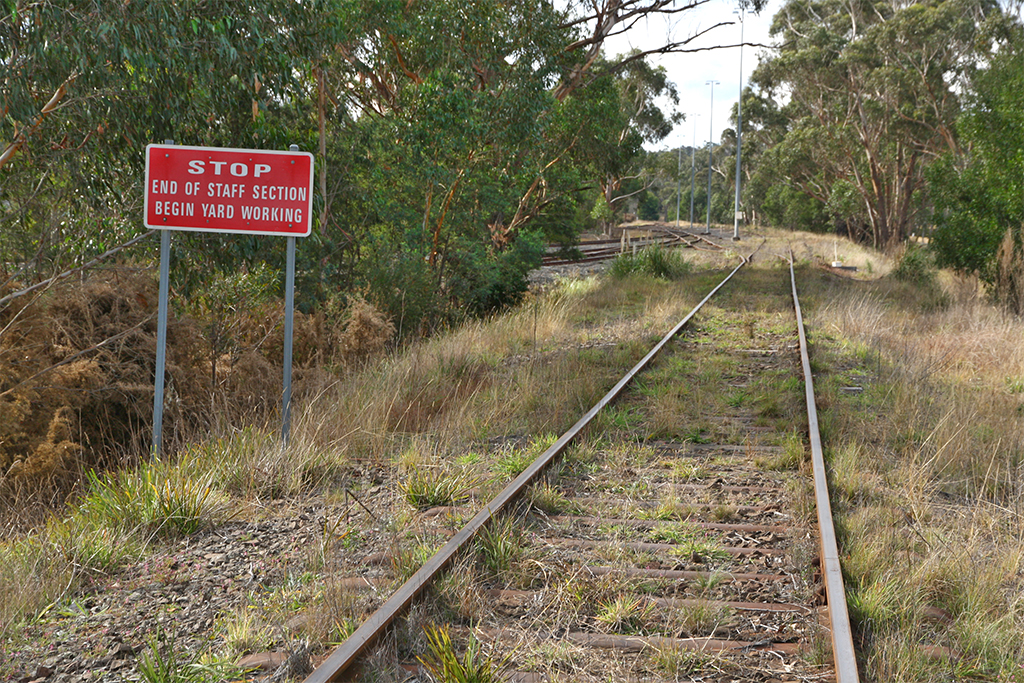
Braemar industrial area sidings

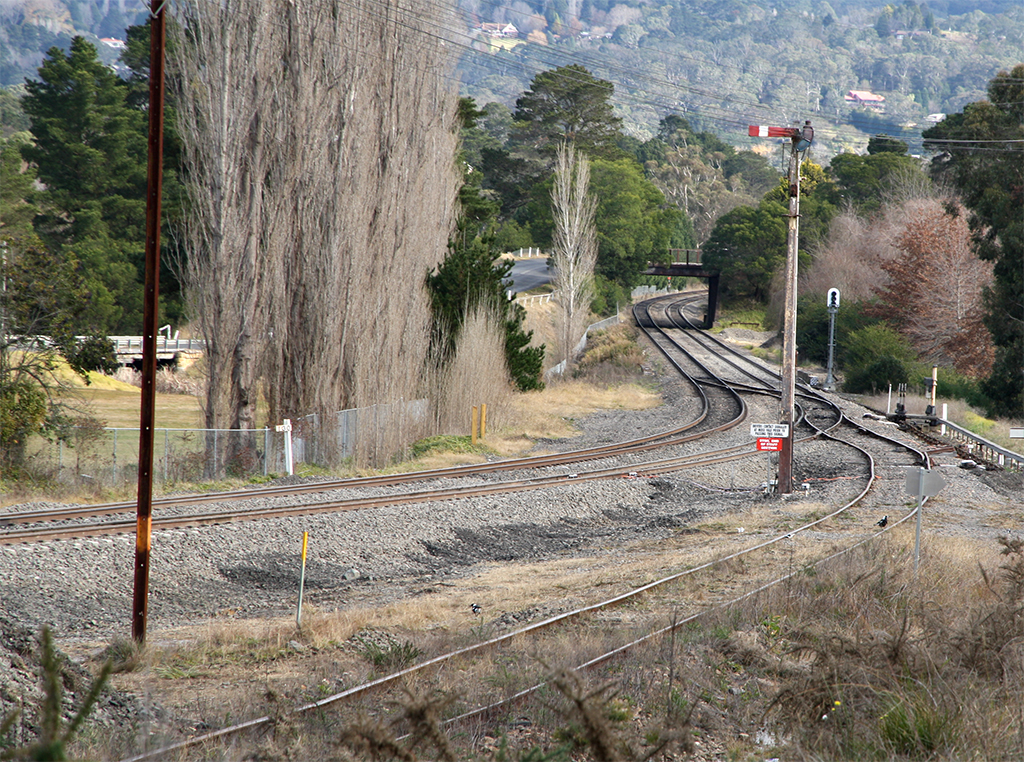
North of Mittagong looking south with 1919 deviation on left, Loop Line on right
