= Mail Coach Inn =

- Location within New South Wales Location within Australia
- 34.4891°S 150.3329°E
- Location: 24 Jellore Street, Berrima, Wingecarribee Shire, New South Wales, Australia

History
- Built: 1833–1841

Site notes
- Owner: David and Wendy Paley

New South Wales Heritage Register
- Official name: Mail Coach Inn (former); (Former) (Royal) Mail Coach Inn; (current trading name (but historically inaccurate) is The Coach & Horses Inn(
- Type: state heritage (built)
- Designated: 2 April 1999
- Reference no.: 102
- Type: Inn/Tavern
- Category: Commercial

Mail Coach Inn is a heritage-listed former inn and residence at 24 Jellore Street, Berrima, Wingecarribee Shire, New South Wales, Australia. It was built from 1833 to 1841. It is also known as the Royal Mail Coach Inn. It traded in recent times as a now-closed bed and breakfast known as the Coach and Horses Inn; however, that name historically referred to a different Berrima hotel. It was added to the New South Wales State Heritage Register on 2 April 1999.

== History ==
Berrima is the second oldest (European) settlement in the Wingecarribee Shire and the oldest continuing settlement in the shire. The first town settlement in the district was in 1821 at Bong Bong, 8 km south-east of Berrima on the Wingecarribee River.

The site of Berrima was selected by Surveyor General Sir Thomas Mitchell in 1829 on a visit planning the route for a new road alignment from Sydney to replace the old Argyle Road, which had proven unsatisfactory due to a steep hill climb over the Mittagong Range and river crossing at Bong Bong. In 1830 Mitchell instructed Robert Hoddle to mark out the town based on a plan Mitchell's office prepared, along the lines of a traditional English village (with a central market place and as many blocks as possible facing onto the Wingecarribee River), and using the local Aboriginal name. The new line of road came through the town. Berrima was to be established as the commercial and administrative centre for the County of Camden.

Following the approval of Governor Bourke in 1831, the period 1824 to 1841 saw significant flourishing development as mail coaches changed their route to this new line of road.

Early town lots were sold in 1833, predominantly to innkeepers and around Market Square. In March 1833, Bryan McMahon (occasionally recorded as MacMahon) purchased the site of the Coach and Horses Inn, along with the adjoining site of the Berrima Inn (also known as McMahon's Inn). McMahon was an innkeeper from Sutton Forest. Both lots are located at the eastern corner of Bryan and Jellore Streets.

It is understood that the building was built by a Mr. Matthews during McMahon's ownership. It operated under the sign of the (Royal) Mail Coach Inn, from 1837 to 1839, as a licensed public house and staging post for travel and delivery of mail, run by licensee Michael Doyle. This was one of the first inns to operate in Berrima, along with the Surveyor-General Inn and the Berrima Inn (next door on Lot 1 Section 2). Doyle transferred the (Royal) Mail Coach Inn's liquor licence to the opposite side of Market Square in 1839 to operate from the property he and his wife had purchased, which is now known as the White Horse Inn.

The recent use of the "Coach and Horses Inn" name for this property is misleading. Research has revealed that the Coach & Horses Inn never operated from this site. The original Coach and Horses Inn) licence, granted to Lewis Levy in 1856, was located on the corner of Oxley Street and Argyle Street (the Old Hume Highway), a building now known as Bramber Cottage.

Since 1839 when the (Royal) Mail Coach Inn liquor licence was transferred, the Coach & Horses Inn property has been maintained as a private residence.

Bryan and his wife Winifred McMahon mortgaged Lot 2 Section 2 to William Morrice of Comfort Hill in April 1850, two days before Bryan died. In 1841 Morrice had taken up the half share of his brother John's grant from Reverend Doctor John Dunmore Lang, where he built Comfort Hill (farm homestead). This house was regarded as a twin house to "Eling Forest" opposite on the Great South Road (now the Hume Highway).

Bryan Patrick McMahon (son of Bryan) had inherited Lots 1 & 2 Section 2 and in 1862 sold both lots containing the original Berrima Inn and the stone and brick building to Francis Breen. Governor Bourke executed the inn's land grant in 1862, transferring it to Francis Breen, innkeeper. Breen was already a previous innkeeper having owned Breen's Commercial Hotel in Berrima in 1840(since renamed the Colonial Inn, the Old Breen's restaurant and currently named "Eschalots" restaurant).

In 1863 a map of Berrima noted the property was in the possession of B. MacMahon. The will of Francis Breen, executed by the Supreme Court in 1870, bequeathed 'the house and premises known as McMahon's house situated in Market Square' to his brother Edward Breen.

In 1885 Edward sold it to Sutton Forest farmer John Sewell Sr. and in 1887 he sold it to Percy Hiram Matthews, a clerk of Berrima In October 1947 Matthews, described as a retired bank officer, sold it to Mrs Nellie Clinton, wife of Joseph Erin Clinton, Berrima State Works secretary. Three months later Joseph Clinton died in Moss Vale and was buried in Berrima cemetery.

In 1888 an eastern extension was added to the Mail Coach Inn residence, with a Victorian bay window facing Jellore Street. A new extension at the residence's rear forms the house's kitchen and bathroom.

Nelly Clinton continued to live in the house until shortly before her death in 1970, with her son Joseph Basil Clinton and family living next door at the old Berrima Inn. In 1969 Nellie Clinton sold the property to Robert Glenn, a truck driver of Colo Vale. It was sold to Brian Thomas Timmis, a builder from Loftus, in 1988. During the ownership of Timmis, three new buildings were built on the site. Photographs of the property in a "For Sale" advertisement show all buildings now on site were there in 1989. The advertisement notes the property had been recently restored and was operating as a commercial venture for accommodation.

The property developed into use as a commercial residential business as a bed and breakfast operation in the late 1980s during the ownership of Brian Timmis.

In June 1988 its title was converted by the then Land Titles Office to the now Lot 1 DP 780565.

The property was renamed "Coach & Horses Inn" in the 1980s by the developer who was restoring it.

In 1990 the property was transferred to Lesley Bensley, a receptionist of Burradoo.

In July 2002 it was sold to David and Wendy Paley.

The Coach and Horses Inn bed and breakfast is no longer in operation.

== Description ==
=== Site and grounds ===
The former Mail Coach Inn and adjacent Berrima Inn play a significant role in and contribute to the streetscape of the Jellore Street / Berrima Market Square precinct. The inns contribute to the predominantly Colonial/Victorian Georgian architecture of the Berrima village and the Jellore Street precinct.

The site forms part of the Jellore Street group of early cottages. It lies generally in a north–south orientation on the northern side of Berrima Market Square on a gentle north-sloping site between Jellore Street and the Wingecarribee River. It comprises a cluster of buildings near the street behind a picket fence, with a gravel car parking area on the front western side, a brick paved courtyard behind the inn, a lawn area between the cottage outbuilding (former kitchen) and stone outbuilding to its rear, a garden area with trees sloping down to the north to a fence and gate and the Wingecarribee River at its north. The building group is connected by brick and stone paving, surrounded by small gardens (garden beds) and native trees, grouped in rolling lawns to the north.

There is a view to Berrima Gaol from the rear of the property. Well maintained gardens and vegetation fall to the northern boundary, fence and gate leading down steeper grassed banks to the river. Situated also on the site are various trees, freestanding storage building (former outdoor privy) and vegetable gardens.

A 1930 aerial photograph shows there are no mature trees or significant (sized) garden (elements) on the site. It is not until the 1969 aerial photograph that any trees (an apple and a poplar, both still on site) are evident on the site, indicating that almost all vegetation is less than 40 years old.

The garden is predominantly a modern installation (post 1969–1988) with only few trees displaying maturity, including an apple (Malus domestica cv.) north of Dandarbong cottage and a Lombardy poplar (Populus nigra 'Italica') on the western boundary north of Daphne cottage. Other trees within the common area are young eucalypts, wattles, poplars and seedling Prunus sp. to the north of the building group, and three deciduous trees adjacent to the entrance to the car park.

The gardens between the buildings and Jellore Street are typically cottage in style with use of lavender, apple blossom (Escallonia sp.) and Abelia grandiflora as hedges. Exotic trees and shrubs such as Chinese elm (Ulmus parvifolia), Japanese maple (Acer palmatum) and Iowa crabapple (Malus ioensis) provide seasonal interest and maintain the landscape character and connection to the Jellore Street-scape and the exotic Monterey pine (Pinus radiata) planting of the Market Square opposite.

The outdoor privy is evident in all the aerial photographs however during the 1988 building works it was rebuilt using recycled stone.

All other buildings on site were erected during the Timmis ownership from 1988 to 1990. Paths, driveways, fences and paved areas were also added during this time. The new plantings on site, including the semi-mature trees, were added after the 1988 renovations.

=== Buildings ===
There were 6 buildings on site as of 2007, being:

==== Inn ====
The original inn building is a single-storey, 6 room cottage, built in three stages from the 1830s, 1850s and 1880s. This has a strong connection to Berrima Market Place primarily due to its proximity to the street and high visibility from many locations in the Market Place. The setback of the original residence places the building behind the setback of the two neighbouring properties, Berrima Inn and Victoria Inn.

The exterior is brick rendered marked out in stone joints, with 12 pane single hung sash windows. The painted, cement-rendered masonry is ruled to resemble ashlar stone. The asymmetrical front elevation features a hipped roofed projecting wing to east and with unusual angled bay window (with small roof-hood over). The remainder of the front elevation has a skillion roofed verandah supported on square timber posts. The windows to front are 2 x 6 pane single hung sashes. The main roof is half gabled and clad in corrugated steel.

It is internally divided into 6 rooms, consisting of lounge room, two bedrooms, bathroom, dressing room and kitchen. All are contained within the footprint of the original 1856 building which shows evidence of significant degree of footprint and internal fabric intactness that has received modification and intrusive elements and materials to the 3 rear rooms over years of ownership. The laundry is located externally and under an added skillion roof. All living areas have been renovated in the last 20 years, with new plaster ceilings, cove cornice, plastered and painted walls and painted skirting boards. Living and bed rooms have timber floors, with permanent or occasional carpets.

==== Inn cottage to rear of inn ====
1856 cottage outbuilding (former kitchen block). Freestanding single storey simple room in brick with symmetrical hipped corrugated iron roof and close eaves. Brick is rendered. Exhibits significant fireplaces and together with its footprint still confirms the original intactness of the former kitchen which served the inn. These were traditionally detached. The western facade is punctured by two windows and a timber door arranged symmetrically. Currently linked by a more recent flat roof addition and laundry cupboard extension.

==== Sandstone outbuilding to rear of inn cottage ====
Freestanding storage building (former outdoor privy). Reconstructed and renovated in 1988, using materials excess to building needs for the two cottages. Internal walls rendered and new toilet installed.

==== Modern outbuildings ====
1988 double weatherboard garage (to rear (north) of Stone outbuilding, on eastern boundary)

Double garage of treated pine pole supports timber framed and weatherboard gabling with a metal gabled roof. Shows evidence of a reconstruction from a previous dilapidated garage and is evidence of refurbishing in the last 15 years. Built using recycled materials by Brian Timmis in 1988.

1988 weatherboard cottage (south-west of Inn, in middle of block) 'Dandenong (Dandarbong) Cottage';

Constructed in the style of an early timber weatherboard cottage in a rudimentary (simple, rectangular) form as it contains no internal wall or ceiling linings with all frame work exposed. Gabled corrugated iron roof running east–west. Internal finishes include painted and stained exposed timber beams and studs, with a polished timber floor. Surrounded by a corrugated iron roofed verandah on the south-west and north,) which links it to "Daphne" cottage.

1988 2 storey brick barn (south-west of inn on western boundary) 'Daphne Cottage'

Although the setback for Daphne cottage is behind the line of the early buildings, the height of the cottage gives it a dominant presence when viewed from the street. The north–south orientation and tall two storey gabled roof that addresses the street is in contrast to all other buildings that can be viewed from Jellore Street. Brick two-storey simple rectangular structure with a gable roof running north–south. The southern facade is of dressed stone work and through its construction materials and finishes indicates its construction during the 1988-90 period. Comprises a large single ground floor room timber framed boxed corner bathroom with timber stairs leading to a large attic bedroom. The ground floor with finishes of exposed brick and timber floors accommodates a living area and kitchen. The timber staircase leads to a carpeted single bedroom, leading out to a northern timber deck overlooking the Wingecarribee River. The southern facade was built with recycled stone from the Sydney Museum.

=== Modifications and dates ===
- 1833–41: original section built (eastern bedroom).
- 1850s: extension to include current lounge room east of original section and a fireplace.
- 1880s: Victorian bay window and extension added to eastern side, now used as second bedroom. A new extension at the residence's rear forms the house's kitchen and bathroom.
- 1930s–1969: no new buildings built on site. The 1930 aerial photograph shows no mature trees or significant (sized) garden (elements) on site. It is not until the 1969 aerial photograph that any trees (an apple and a poplar, both still on site) are evident on the site, indicating that almost all vegetation is less than 40 years old.
- 1979: A sketch of the site includes a picket fence and an entrance timber pergola, the original stone boundary fence to the east, and a water tank and small tree to the rear of the house (both now removed).
- Pre-1988: eastern rubble brick wall patched. The stone boundary wall between the house and Jellore Street is the only remnant of the early built elements in the landscape. This wall was reconstructed in 1988 using material from the original wall located along this fence line. To allow this wall to be read as a reconstructed element, it was constructed as a coarsed stone wall in contrast to the original random rubble wall that matched the house.
- 1988–90 (Timmis ownership)
  - Additions to the rear as outbuildings; modern picket fence to front elevation.
  - Early aerial photographs show a cluster of buildings on the site, including the original privy, a garden shed and chook house. All these buildings were removed or reconstructed during the building works of 1988. The garden was also extensively renovated, with the northern garden sculpted into rolling mounds and planted to fast-growing native trees, including gums and wattles. New stone and brick paths were installed to link each of the new buildings, and fences erected to provide privacy between buildings.
  - Refurbished original residence, re-roofed eastern section. NB: during refurbishment, the arrangement of the roof timbers indicated the original portion of the house was the western bedroom. The loungeroom and fireplace had been added later, followed by the eastern bedroom that had the inscription "1888" engraved in one of the roof beams.
  - Two cottages/garage ('Dandenong' (Dandarbong', replacing an earlier garage* and "Daphne" are the cottages) built on western side of the property to service the tourism industry. Daphne's materials included front facade stone sourced from the Sydney Museum.
  - The original driveway swept in from Jellore Street to the garage, located to the north-west of the freestanding kitchen building. By the 2001 aerial photograph the driveway and car park had been realigned to occupy the area west of the house, with no driveway access to the rear of the property.
  - Installation of recycled stone paving linking the two cottages, sourced from the Sydney Museum when it was undergoing renovations and reconstruction.
  - Various other paths and edging were added to the vegetable patch, the stone from the Sydney Museum source again. Construction of the timber shed directly behind the house from recycled materials. [New timber garage and reconstructed outdoor privy
  - Installation of the new driveway in its current form, and surfacing with crushed granite. A chook house has been removed, as well as the garage (removed to build Dandarbong.

All other buildings on site were erected during the Timmis ownership from 1988 to 1990. Paths, driveways, fences and paved areas were also added during this time. The new plantings on site, including the semi-mature trees, were added after the 1988 renovations.

Elements in the garden installed since 1988 include:

- reconstruction of the picket fence along Jellore Street, entrance pergola and pedestrian gate;
- concrete path to front verandah and concrete paving under clothesline;
- the driveway and car park area surfaced with decomposed granite;
- a treated timber (pine) lattice fence installed separating the car park from the new buildings, a timber picket fence enclosing the clothes line to the north of the original kitchen and a post-and-rail fence to the north along the Wingecarribee River;
- stone retaining edge around the compost and vegetable garden using recycled blocks of sandstone;
- stone paths between the cottages using recycled blocks of sandstone sourced during building works at the Museum of Sydney;
- recycled clay bricks and paving creating the paths and paved areas between buildings;
- the wood shed.

== Heritage listing ==
The former (Royal) Mail Coach Inn is significant through associations with the local community of Berrima and as a somewhat architecturally unusual component of the town's stock of early buildings. The building is also a component of the Jellore Street group, though it varies from the usual form of its neighbours with its asymmetrical front layout and other features such as half-gabled roof.

Mail Coach Inn was listed on the New South Wales State Heritage Register on 2 April 1999.
