= Croot =

Croot is a surname. Notable people with the surname include:

- Ernest S. Croot III (born 1972), American mathematician
- Estelle Maria Croot (born 1964), now known as Estelle Asmodelle, Australia's first legal transsexual
- Fred Croot (1885–1958), English footballer
