= Jellore Cottage =

- Location within New South Wales Location within Australia
- 34.4892°S 150.3337°E
- Location: 16 Jellore Street, Berrima, Wingecarribee Shire, New South Wales, Australia

New South Wales Heritage Register
- Official name: House; Jellore Cottage
- Type: state heritage (built)
- Designated: 2 April 1999
- Reference no.: 101
- Type: House
- Category: Residential buildings (private)

Jellore Cottage is a heritage-listed house at 16 Jellore Street, Berrima in the Southern Highlands region of New South Wales, Australia. It is also known as Munday Cottage. It was added to the New South Wales State Heritage Register on 2 April 1999.

== History ==
Jellore Cottage dates from c. 1860s. It has been claimed that it was built for the stable-manager of the Victoria Inn.

The "Settler's Hut" at the rear of the cottage was erected in Wheeo as a bushman's hut c. 1840s, and after falling into disrepair, was moved to Berrima and re-erected in the 1990s.

Jellore Cottage was renovated in the 1950s, with interior walls, floors and ceilings covered in masonite, the fireplace boarded over, the fuel stove in the kitchen removed and the chimney sealed.

Prior to 1991, the original windows of Jellore Cottage were replaced with aluminium framed components and a modern steel balustrade was added to the front verandah and modern fence.

It was restored by the Historic Houses Trust of New South Wales from 1992.

Between 1991 and 2010, the aluminium windows were replaced with timber colonial pane type, and the fence was replaced with timber picket fence.

It now operates as bed and breakfast accommodation.

== Description ==
Jellore Cottage is a single storey weatherboard cottage with gabled roof continued as a skillion over the front verandah. It has two external brick chimneys at the east end with simple band of projecting brickwork as the neck moulding. The timber framed verandah is supported on five square timber posts (not original). The weatherboard lining of the main gable end walls is continued over the ends of the verandah. The original windows have also been replaced with modern timber colonial style windows.

The grounds feature a cottage garden to street with a (recent, sympathetic) low timber picket fence to Jellore Street and the cottage set well back on the block. The site is a long block running north to the Wingecarribee River. West of the cottage is a line of tall, mature Bhutan cypresses (Cupressus torulosa), a former hedge. To the rear is a Lombardy poplar tree (Populus nigra 'Italica').

At the rear of the cottage is the "Settler's Cottage", a vertical slab cottage that was moved from another site and rebuilt, and another garden.

== Heritage listing ==
This cottage is significant to the local community as a typical representative of the small 19th century weatherboard cottages to be found throughout Berrima. Its overall form and what remains of its early detailing also contribute to the significance of the group of early buildings along Jellore Street.

Jellore Cottage was listed on the New South Wales State Heritage Register on 2 April 1999.
