= Harper's Mansion =

Heritage-listed house in New South Wales

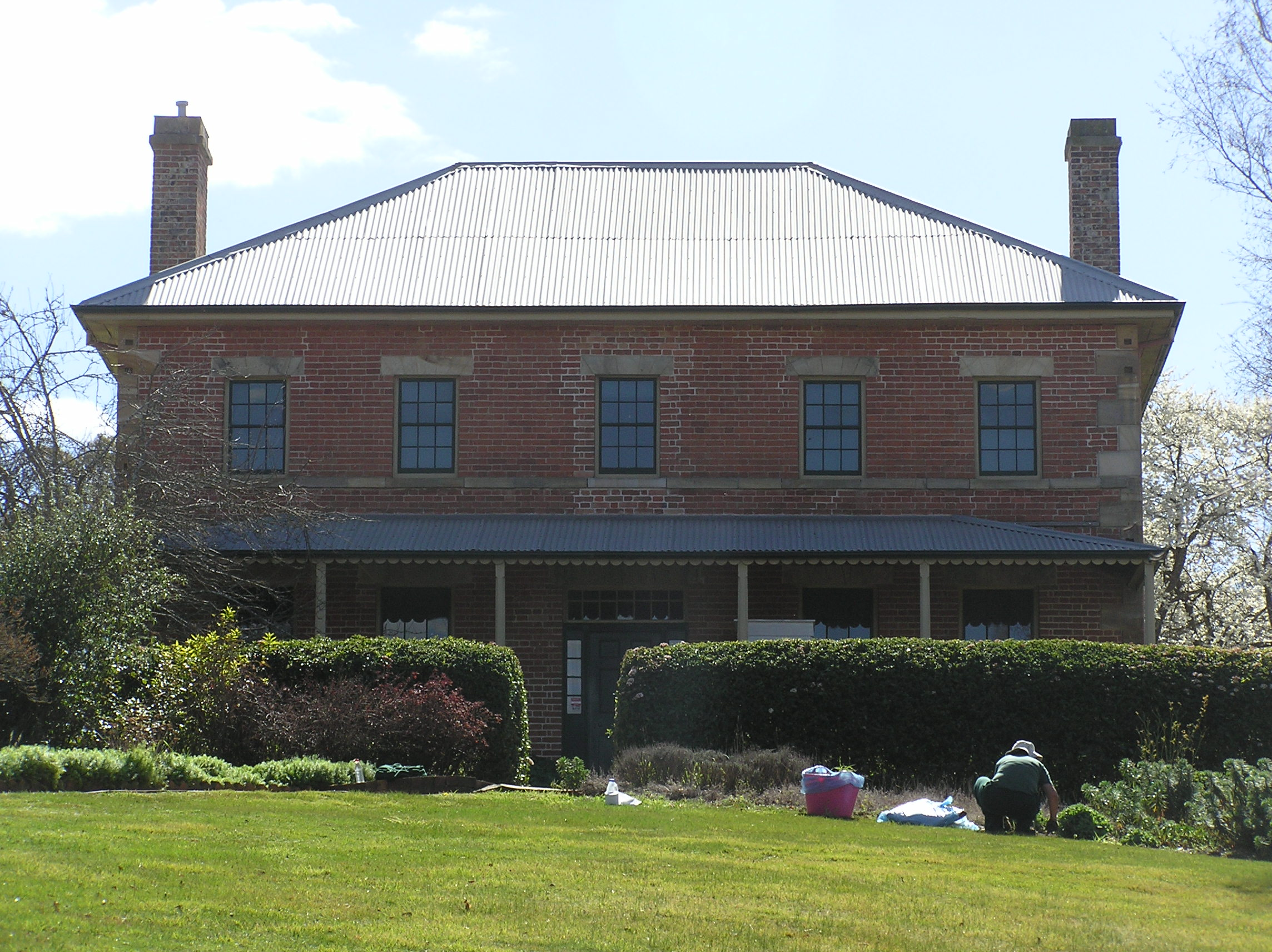

- Location within New South Wales Location within Australia
- 34.4856°S 150.3396°E
- Location: Wilkinson Street, Berrima, Wingecarribee Shire, New South Wales, Australia

History
- Built: 1834–1844

Site notes
- Architectural style: Georgian
- Owner: National Trust of Australia (NSW)
- Website: http://harpersmansion.com.au/

New South Wales Heritage Register
- Official name: Harper's Mansion; Harper's Hill
- Type: state heritage (built)
- Designated: 1 March 2002
- Reference no.: 1500
- Type: House
- Category: Residential buildings (private)
- Builders: James Harper

Harper's Mansion is a heritage-listed house and museum at Berrima, in the Southern Highlands region of New South Wales, Australia. It is recognised for its Georgian design. Harper's Mansion is now a property of the National Trust of Australia (NSW), which acquired it in 1978. It was added to the New South Wales State Heritage Register on 1 March 2002.

== History ==
James Harper and his wife Mary bought his first block of land in Berrima in 1832 on which he built the Surveyor General Inn in 1834, becoming its licensee in 1835. He was a Sutton Forest publican and that district's Chief Constable until 1835. In 1834 he purchased the 100 acres (40 ha) on which he built what is now called 'Harper's Mansion', which was most likely built in 1835-36. The house was built with a single storey verandah and a detached brick kitchen. By 1844 there was also a stable block and a fenced garden.

The 100,000 clay bricks were made on-site and the Trust believes that the stone was quarried locally. At the time, tradesmen were building the court house and jail, and James may have used them. The National Trust thinks that the house was built from the pattern book of a Georgian townhouse, which was common in the colony.

Harper died in 1845 with financial difficulties. It appears he had overreached himself and was caught by the recession of the 1840s. Berrima failed to develop as he had hoped. Many blocks had been sold to speculators, but few had been developed and the streets were not cleared until 1837.

Following Harper's death, in 1845, his mortgagee, William Hutchinson in 1846 took possession of the house. Harper's widow Mary married James McDermott and moved into the Surveyor-General Inn, which her family owned until the 1920s. The house was leased by the church from 1853. It was used as a presbytery for the priests of St Francis Xavier's Roman Catholic Church in 1853. At this time the house was well established, with mention of flower garden with fruit trees, gardener's cottage, well, and horse paddock.

The Catholic Church bought the house from Hutchinson's trustees in 1856, and owned it until 1970. It served as presbytery until the 1880s and was home to 16 priests and 2 bishops until c. 1900. In 1898 the priest was relocated to Moss Vale and the house was vacant until four Sisters of the Daughters of Our Lady of the Sacred Heart, who had opened a school in Berrima, used it as a convent from 1903 to 1909.

Between 1909 and 1970 the Church leased the house to various tenants and Harper's Mansion progressively fell into disrepair. In 1950 the two-storeyed verandah, which had replaced the earlier single-storeyed verandah, collapsed. By then the upper storey, with broken panes stuffed with sacks, was no longer in use. The original detached brick kitchen had collapsed and a fuel stove had been installed in the room to the right of the front door. A small corrugated iron shed near the back door served as a laundry and bathroom with water being drawn from the well by a rope and bucket.

In 1970 the Church sold the now derelict property to Mr and Mrs W. G. E. Williams. The new owners intended to restore the house, but on realising the enormity of the task, they decided to sell. Eager to have the house restored, the Mittagong Shire Council applied for a grant, then transferred the grant to the National Trust of Australia (NSW) and facilitated the sale of the property in 1978 which included a subdivision. The firm of the heritage architects Clive Lucas Stapleton and Partners undertook the seven-year restoration and Harper's Mansion was opened to the public in 1985. It was then a house museum from 1985 to 1999.

From 1999–2006 local landscape designer Michael Jackman leased it and lived here, creating today's expansive and sympathetic garden and maze (the maze is where there was once only paddock). The garden featured a squared path with axial front path and the Trust's aim was to recreate a garden that might have been here in the 1830s, using plants known to be available at that time.

In 2007, the property was re-opened to the public and further work was begun on the garden, which had been laid out in 1999. The Historic Houses Trust of New South Wales Colonial Plant List provided information about the most likely original plantings. In 2011 the eastern main bed of perennials was replaced with heritage roses, many of which would have entered the commercial market before the middle of the 19th century. Among them are: Aimée Vibert (1828), Belle Isis (1845), Bullata (1809), Chapeau de Napoleon (1828), Charles de Mills (before 1790), Hermosa (1840), Konigin von Danemark (1816), Rosa bracteata, Rosa gallica officinalis and Rosa laevigata.

== Description ==
Harper's Mansion is a two-storey, Georgian styled brick house set in two acres of grounds.

The house is five bays wide by two bays deep with a hipped roof now sheeted in corrugated iron. Stone quoins and an elegant front door distinguishes the house with fan and sidelights. The house originally had a single storey verandah its main front. This later had a balcony added but all has now disappeared and only the stone flagged terrace remains.

Internally the house retains the majority of its original joinery and plasterwork. The door are six paneled and the chimney surrounds have roundels. Behind the house there was once a detached brick kitchen and stables and a privy which still remains.

There is remains of the squared cottage garden in front of the house with axial path and evidence of fence and gatepost.

The two acres of grounds include a modern but sympathetic garden, with many plants common in 19th century rural gardens. A feature at the rear (north) of the house is a maze.

The fact that the house, with exception of the removal of the verandah, survives virtually unaltered adds to its significance. The Mansion contains original ceilings and cornices, painted original plaster to walls, originally ceiling rose, skirting, stairs, floor, and balustrade. These original features add to the integrity of the heritage property.

== Heritage listing ==
Harper's Mansion is one of the most archetypal colonial Georgian houses surviving in NSW and a significant element in the historic town of Berrima. It is representative of a Georgian house and is of rare quality in the region and possibly NSW. It is associated with the Harper family and the Roman Catholic Church and the development of Berrima.

Harper's Mansion is one of Berrima's best known buildings. Harper's Mansion is recognised for its Georgian design and history relating back to 1834. The house was built by James Harper for his family and was for 120 years the property of the Roman Catholic Church. Despite its long use by the Church it has retained Harper's name and is known by most people as Harper's Mansion and mid-nineteenth century descriptions use the name Harper's Hill. The property has always retained its prominence in Berrima.

Harper's Mansion was listed on the New South Wales State Heritage Register on 1 March 2002 having satisfied the following criteria.

The place is important in demonstrating the course, or pattern, of cultural or natural history in New South Wales.

Harper's Mansion is significant as it represent an archetypal colonial house of the 1830s. It is also a suburban house of the 1830s retaining its full garden curtilage and a rare group of intact 1830s interiors. The historical association with James Harper and the Church is also of importance. John Harper (1806–1845) was a local identity who served as district constable at Sutton Forest. The Harper family also built the Surveyor General Inn and James was its first licensee. In 1844 Harper was elected to the Berrima District Council.

The place is important in demonstrating aesthetic characteristics and/or a high degree of creative or technical achievement in New South Wales.

The aesthetic significance of Harper's Mansion is extremely important in the construction and recognition of Berrima as a heritage town. The house and grounds accurately construct space by representing property of the eighteenth century. Harper's Mansion is a prominent site in the townscape of a recognised historic town.

The place has strong or special association with a particular community or cultural group in New South Wales for social, cultural or spiritual reasons.

Harper's Mansion contains social significance as it represents a homestead built by the middle class colonialists during the first half of the nineteenth century. Although the house was built for James Harper and his family, the property had a 120-year association with Roman Catholic Church mainly as a presbytery. This adds a religious significance to the property.

The place is important in demonstrating the principal characteristics of a class of cultural or natural places/environments in New South Wales.

Harper's House is one of the most archetypal Colonial Georgian houses surviving in New South Wales and represents a significant piece of history in the settlement of Berrima.

== See also ==
- List of National Trust properties in Australia
- List of rose cultivars named after people
