= Nurses Cottage =

- Location within New South Wales Location within Australia
- 34.4907°S 150.3342°E
- Location: 5 Market Street, Berrima, Wingecarribee Shire, New South Wales, Australia

New South Wales Heritage Register
- Official name: Nurses Cottage
- Type: state heritage (built)
- Designated: 2 April 1999
- Reference no.: 99
- Type: Cottage
- Category: Residential buildings (private)

Nurses Cottage is a heritage-listed cottage at 5 Market Street, Berrima, Wingecarribee Shire, New South Wales, Australia. It is also known as Rose Cottage. It was added to the New South Wales State Heritage Register on 2 April 1999.

== History ==
It was built as nurses' quarters c. 1890 for the occupants of the Magistrate's House. It has also been used as a baby health care centre and as a shop for gifts and collectibles.

== Description ==
Nurses Cottage is a small single storey weatherboard cottage with a gabled roof continued as a skillion over the front verandah. The verandah features square timber posts and scalloped boarding to ends (probably later fabric). The main gables have small louvered vents with pointed heads. The windows to front elevation are 2 x 6 pane sashes.

== Significance ==
The former Nurses Cottage is significant to the local community as part of the early housing stock of the town and as a site associated with the Magistrate's House adjacent. Is also a typical representative - in its overall form and what remains of its original detail - of the many small 19th century weatherboard cottages in Berrima. The cottage is also part of the Market Place precinct and Magistrate's House/ White Horse Inn group of buildings.

== Heritage listing ==
Nurses Cottage was listed on the New South Wales State Heritage Register on 2 April 1999.
