= Berrima Post Office =

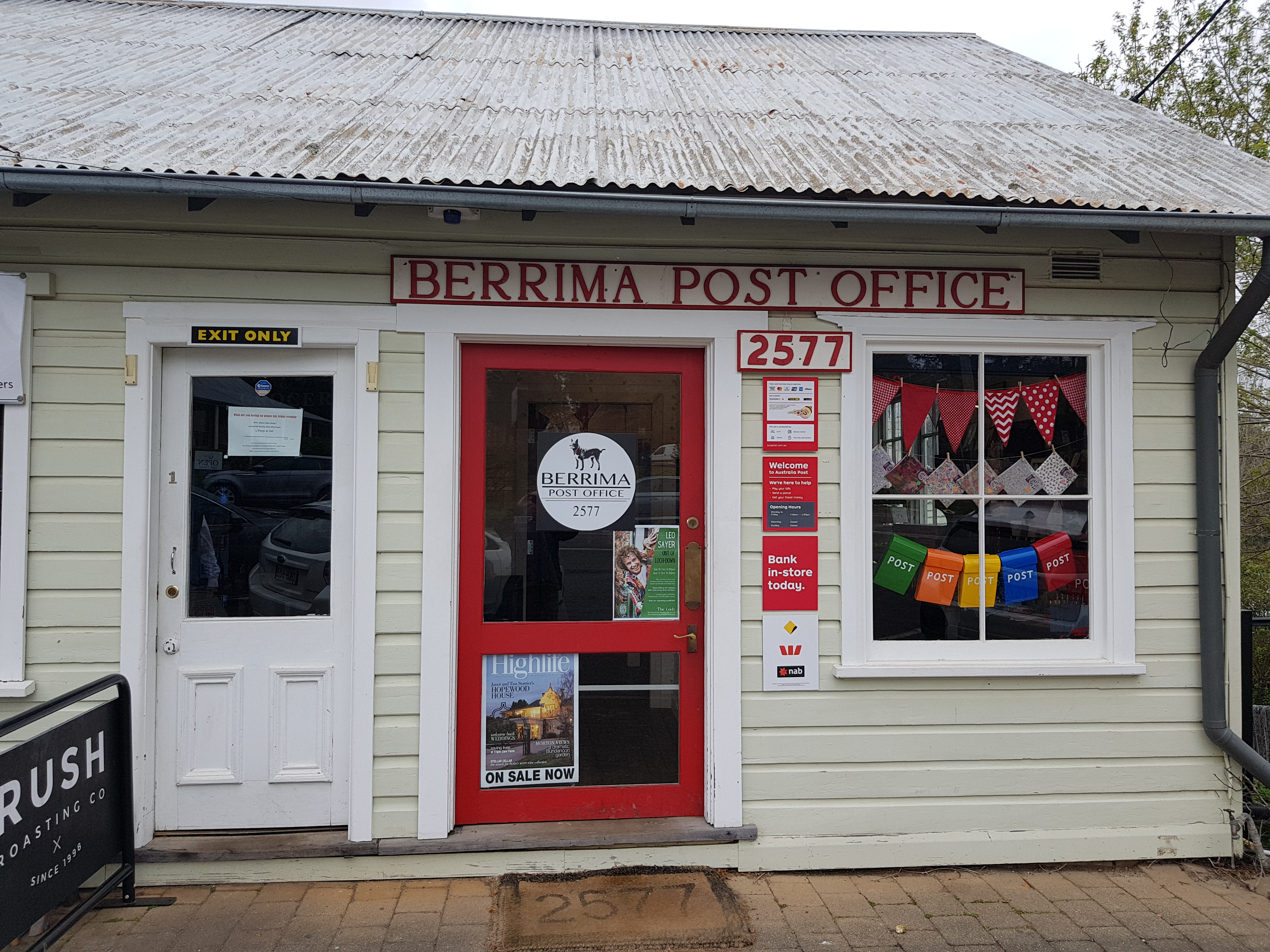
- Berrima Post Office, 2020

- Location within New South Wales Location within Australia
- 34.4895°S 150.3356°E
- Location: Argyle Street, Berrima, Wingecarribee Shire, New South Wales, Australia

History
- Built: 1886

New South Wales Heritage Register
- Official name: Berrima Post Office
- Type: state heritage (built)
- Designated: 2 April 1999
- Reference no.: 97
- Type: Post office
- Category: Postal and telecommunications
- Builders: RN Mathews

Berrima Post Office is a heritage-listed post office at Argyle Street, Berrima, in the Southern Highlands of New South Wales, Australia. It was built in 1886 by R. N. Matthews. It was added to the New South Wales State Heritage Register on 2 April 1999.

== History ==
Berrima is the second oldest European settlement in Wingecarribee Shire and the oldest continuing settlement in the shire. The first town settlement in the district was in 1821 at Bong Bong, 8 km south-east of Berrima on the Wingecarribee River.

The site of Berrima was selected by Surveyor General Sir Thomas Mitchell in 1829 on a visit planning the route for a new road alignment from Sydney to replace the old Argyle Road, which had proven unsatisfactory due to a steep hill climb over the Mittagong Range and river crossing at Bong Bong. In 1830 Mitchell instructed Robert Hoddle to mark out the town based on a plan Mitchell's office prepared, along the lines of a traditional English village (with a central market place and as many blocks as possible facing onto the Wingecarribee River), and using the local Aboriginal name. The new line of road came through the town. Berrima was to be established as the commercial and administrative centre for the County of Camden.

Following the approval of Governor Bourke in 1831, the period 1824 to 1841 saw significant flourishing development as mail coaches changed their route to this new line of road. Early town lots were sold in 1833, predominantly to inn keepers and around Market Square, including the first town Lot sales to Bryan McMahon.

Governor Bourke designated Berrima as a place for a courthouse and jail to serve the southern part of the state. With construction of the jail from 1835 to 1839 and its courthouse in 1838 to serve the southern part of the state the town flourished into the 1840s as mail coaches called, public buildings including churches in 1849 and 1851, establishment of many hotels and coaching houses to service local resident needs and passing trades, persons and commercial travellers. Its 1841 population was 249, with 37 houses completed and 7 more in construction. Research has indicated there were some 13 hotels or grog houses in Berrima at the one time in the early days before the coming of the Southern Railway to the Moss Vale area, which by-passed Berrima.

There is some doubt about the early days of the Berrima Post Office. Apparently the Berrima Office was moved from Bong Bong in June, 1838.

A post office was opened at Bong Bong at least as early as 23 December 1829. John Lowe, Clerk to the Chamber of Magistrates, was given the responsibility of looking after the post office.

Between 1830 and 1837 a number of people filled the job as postmaster. Records state that James Higgins was appointed postmaster at Berrima 1 June 1838. It would appear that the office was moved from Bong Bong to Berrima on that date.

There is very little known of the Berrima Post Office from about 1840 to 1860.

The 1851 census showed the number of buildings remained the same, but the population had dropped to 192. During the 1850s Berrima experienced another boom period after the discovery of gold. When the Great Southern Railway bypassed Berrima in 1867, the town again began to decline as Mittagong, Moss Vale and Bowral developed. Berrima remained virtually unchanged for the next 100 years, preserving the town as an almost intact colonial village.

On 6 September 1858 the Berrima telegraph station was opened and in 1860 a building was bought for use as the telegraph station. At this time the Postal Department and Telegraph Department had no connection at all with one another.

The Berrima Post Office occupied several premises until the 1880s. In 1883 the post office was located in the Glad Tidings building. The telegraph office was nearby.

The telegraph business was now being carried on over a telephone line probably to Moss Vale. This was strongly objected to by the residents for the reason that the telephone system was then in its infancy and shouting into the receiver was necessary. Anyone handy to the post office could hear every word.

In June 1881 a petition was received from Berrima residents asking for the provision of a new post office. It was suggested that an ideal site would be land owned by the Government, where the old Toll Bar used to be. It was also pointed out that the Commercial Bank authorities were about to build a new bank nearly opposite the site.

The Postal Department approved the erection of a new post office on the old Toll Bar site, but finance was not available and the matter was shelved. As a result of further resident agitation and the dilapidated condition of the then post office building, the tender of R. N. Matthews & Sons was accepted 22 April 1886 for 777 pounds.

The Berrima Post Office was erected on the earlier "Old Tollhouse" or Tollbar site. The postmaster was moved into the new office on 17 August 1887.

It was not until 1890 that the block of ground, being Lot 19 of Section 2, was transferred to the Postmaster-General.

Because of the decline of revenue, Berrima was made a semi-official office and Mrs C. Reynolds took charge of it on 9 January 1909.

On 1 March 1912 she was succeeded by Mrs B. Walker.

A weatherboard wing was added c. 1930s.

In 1988, a new building was constructed at the rear of the post office. The post office was restored at that time, with internal modifications made.

In late 2019, the Post Office (store) moved out of the building to a new location next to the general store, located 200m north and opposite the jail.

== Description ==
Berrima Post Office is a painted brick building with stone foundations. It has a corrugated iron roof and features a verandah to the front of the building.

It was reported to be in good physical condition at the time of its heritage listing, with low archaeological potential.

== Heritage listing ==
The Post Office is located on the site of the earlier "Old Tollbar". The post office is situated on a prominent corner site in the town of Berrima. It makes an important contribution to the historic precinct of Berrima.

Berrima Post Office was listed on the New South Wales State Heritage Register on 2 April 1999.
