= Makin Cottage =

- Location within New South Wales Location within Australia
- 34.4911°S 150.3334°E
- Location: Stockade Street, Berrima, Wingecarribee Shire, New South Wales, Australia

New South Wales Heritage Register
- Official name: Makin Cottage
- Type: state heritage (built)
- Designated: 2 April 1999
- Reference no.: 104
- Type: Cottage
- Category: Residential buildings (private)

Makin Cottage is a heritage-listed cottage at Stockade Street, Berrima, Wingecarribee Shire, New South Wales, Australia. It is also known as Makin Cottages. It was added to the New South Wales State Heritage Register on 2 April 1999.

== History ==
The cottages were built for the Makin family, an early commercial family of Berrima. The Makins lived in the eastern section and rented the other. The family ran a store selling groceries, drapery and chemist goods on what is now the site of the local service station.

The cottages were subsequently joined into a single dwelling. A weatherboard, skillion roofed addition to the rear was made c. 1980. A boarded partition across the middle of the verandah, which had separated the two occupancies, was removed between 1975 and 1980.

A Permanent Conservation Order was issued for the property on 13 March 1981.

== Description ==
Makin Cottage is a single-storey hipped roof cottage originally designed as a semidetached pair. Walls are of rubble stone (now painted) and the low central chimney is face brickwork. The skillion roofed front verandah features truncated square timber posts on a painted brickwork balustrade and a (modern) boarded end. The cottage is currently not readily visible from the highway, being hidden behind a group of shops.

== Heritage listing ==
Makin Cottage was listed on the New South Wales State Heritage Register on 2 April 1999.
