= Lesley Wylie =

Australian rugby league footballer

Personal information
- Full name: Lesley Charles George Wylie
- Born: 12 April 1887 Berrima, New South Wales
- Died: 1959 (aged 71–72)

Playing information
- Position: Centre, Five-eighth
Club
Years	Team	Pld	T	G	FG	P
1910	Eastern Suburbs	11	2	1	0	8

Leslie Charles George Wylie (1887–1959) was a professional rugby league footballer in the New South Wales Rugby League (NSWRL).

== Playing career ==
Born in Berrima, New South Wales, Wylie played for the Eastern Suburbs club in the 1910 season. He made his debut against Western Suburbs in round 1 of the 1910 season scoring a try in a 24–14 victory. His final game for Eastern Suburbs came in round 14 against Glebe as Easts ran out winners 36–0.
