= Berrima Internment Camp Huts Area =

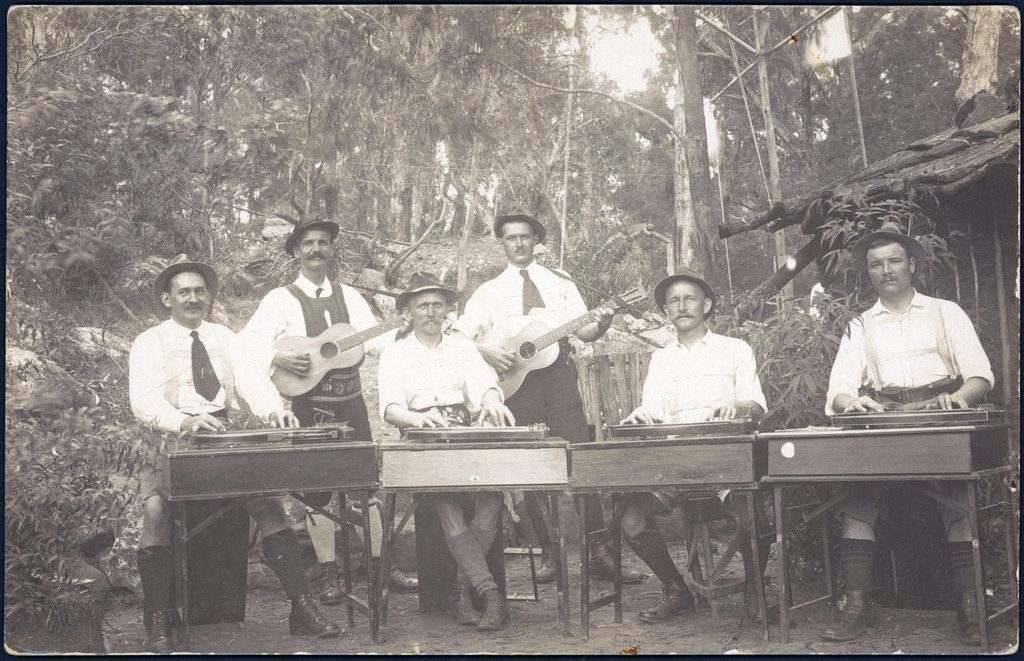
- A group of German prisoners of war playing zithers and guitars in their national dress, Berrima Internment Camp, circa 1916

- Location within New South Wales Location within Australia
- 34.4819°S 150.3262°E
- Location: Argyle Street, Berrima, Wingecarribee Shire, New South Wales, Australia

History
- Built: 1915–1918

New South Wales Heritage Register
- Official name: Berrima Internment Group; Berrima Gaol; German Concentration Camp; Berrima; German Detention Camp; Berrima PoW Camp
- Type: state heritage (complex / group)
- Designated: 14 January 2011
- Reference no.: 1848
- Type: Internment Camp
- Category: Defence

Berrima Internment Camp Huts Area is a heritage-listed former internment camp site at Argyle Street, Berrima, in the Southern Highlands of New South Wales, Australia. It formed an additional section of the former Berrima Internment Camp outside the walls of Berrima Gaol. It was established from 1915 to 1918. The camp was also known as the Berrima PoW Camp, the German Detention Camp and the German Concentration Camp. It was added to the New South Wales State Heritage Register on 14 January 2011.

== History ==
Completed in October 1839, Berrima Gaol's ten-metre-high outer walls were built close to the Wingecarribee River on the south western rear side. Located through the main gates of the gaol was a narrow yard and the services building consisting of the kitchens, laundry, storerooms and a small chapel. Through this building was a second larger yard with a centrally positioned tower block, with north, south and west two-storey cell blocks radiating from it forming a "T" configuration and smaller corner yards. The gaol's isolation cells were located in these corner yards. Most of the cells were small, 2.4 m square, however, there were larger cells, 2.4×3 m that served as duty rooms for guards and the infirmary.

Still in operation today, Berrima Gaol is the oldest functioning gaol in Australia. The gaol was renown throughout the 19th Century as a "foreboding" place where hardened criminals were sent. Flogging was common practice as was solitary confinement in the underground cells deprived of light and sound. In 1862 all convicts sentenced to five years or more by NSW courts were subjected to a year of solitary confinement at the gaol.

The Berrima Gaol served as NSW's principal gaol until it closed its gates in 1909.

=== Berrima Internment Camp ===
In 1915, Berrima Gaol was reopened as an internment camp for German prisoners, serving as a satellite camp of the large Holsworthy Internment Camp at Liverpool, along with Trial Bay Gaol and a number of other facilities in the State.

With the declaration of War in 1914, people of German origin and German property immediately became the "enemy". As Germany had a number of colonies in the South Pacific, there were quite a number of merchant ships in the ports and German shipping vessels in various Australian harbours at the time of the declaration. As a result, the ships were seized by the Australian Armed Forces while in port and German passengers and crew were detained. Other merchant ships were captured offshore by the Navy.

Based on the British Government's concentration camp model during the Boer War (1899-1902), the Australian government adopted the principal by setting up concentration camps in each of the six States to intern the "alien enemy". By early 1915 there were almost 3,000 German internees in Australia. In order to aid communication between camps, to cut costs and to standardise the rules in terms of the treatment of prisoners, the concentration camps were closed in all states other than New South Wales and all internees were transferred to facilities within New South Wales. It was a long and unpleasant journey for many internees who travelled to New South Wales, some were handcuffed and some were treated roughly by officials.

There were some internees who were granted a reprieve from being detained in the camps. They were allowed to live in the community providing they observed conditions of their parole such as reporting to the authorities on a regular basis.

Holsworthy Internment Camp was the major camp to receive the large influx of internees who were being transported from region camps across Australia. There were also Department of Defence internment camps in Bourke in western NSW and Molonglo in the ACT.

Two other sites, Trial Bay and Berrima Gaols were set up as satellite camps in early 1915. Berrima Concentration Camp was to be predominately for ships officers and sailors, and Trial Bay camp mainly held German internees of prominent social standing such as businessmen and professionals.

The structure of Concentration Camps at the time was based initially on the British code of instructions "Royal Warrant", of August 1914. The constraints of the daily lives and treatment of the internees was later based on the Australian "Rules for the Custody of and Maintenance of Discipline among Prisoners of War in NSW". It outlined the compulsory requirements such as twice-daily roll call, rising and sleep and meal times. It also stated that an elected Internee Camp Committee would look after the "general welfare" of the internees and that Committee was to report to the Camp commandant. Under this main committee sat various other sub committees whose job it was to deal with various aspects of life in the camp such as recreation, theatre and music, kitchen services, education and other aspects.

Arriving by train to Moss Vale and then on foot along the long and rough road, the first group of 89 German internees arrived at Berrima in March 1915. The Defence Department had done little to the jail in preparation for its "new arrivals" other than clearing away the rubbish, making the buildings secure and building an observation platform and a small weatherboard hut for the Camp office. It was the condition of the jail upon arriving that the internees named the place "Ahnenschloss Castle of Foreboding". They had no personal items as their luggage had not arrived, the prison cells that were to be their home were mostly empty of furniture and other than a very few provisions like two blankets, the makings for a mattress, and eating utensils, the internees had very little in the way of comfort. Food was supplied, however, the internees had to prepare and cook their own food.

The majority of German internees to arrive at Berrima Camp were German merchant mariners, however, a minority of internees were prisoners of war from German colonies in the region and other men captured from the German Imperial Navy cruiser SMS Emden. A large proportion of the internees were middle to high-ranking merchantmen, including first officers, chief engineers and captains. Otto Pahnke and Robert Martens held very senior positions as senior supervisors of NGL and HAL lines. From photographs, Simons points out that photographic evidence suggests that these ranks were still observed at the camp level.

Part of Germany's Pacific fleet, SMS Emden was quite an infamous Naval cruiser that had many an Allied warship in search of it soon after outbreak of war. Captained by Fregattenkapitan Karl von Müller, the Emden captured many Allied merchant mariners and either took over their vessels or sank them. Having carried out an impressive action and successful raid on Penang in the Battle of Penang where the SMS Emden sank the Russian cruiser Zhemchug and the French destroyer Mousquet, the cruiser steamed off to the Cocos Islands to destroy an important cable wireless communication station linking Australia with the rest of the world. A convoy of Australian and New Zealand warships heading to Colombo picked up wireless activity from SMS Emden and HMAS Sydney's English Captain Glossop gave the order for his vessel to break away from the convey to deal with the cruiser. Shells were fired from both vessels but the Emden was no match for the Sydney which eventually set the Emden on fire and blew away its control tower, bridge and severely damaged its steering. One hundred and thirty six of Captain von Muller's crew were killed and a further sixty-five badly injured before the Emden finally ran aground on a reef of Windward Island in the North Keeling Group.

In the publication Prisoners in Arcady - German Mariners at Berrima 1915-1919, Simmons noted that the Emden men interned at the Berrima Concentration Camp included Chief Engineer Walter Bergien, Engineers Gerhardt Freund and Otto Fisher, Navigator Otto Monkeskieck and Bosun Karl Muller. Martin Meyer, also interned at Berrima was a young reservist who joined the Emden crew as vice navigator and soon after promoted to Lieutenant but was not on the vessel during its last days. This was the case with Bergien, Monkedieck and Muller.

Daily life for the internees at Berrima Gaol was structured around morning roll call and evening roll call at 5:00 pm. Between these two defining events, the internees were free to wander within a two-mile radius of the jail and were locked up during the evening.

Berrima's small population doubled with the arrival of the "enemy aliens" and the guards. The sleepy town once again began to prosper, playing an important role in providing services to the "new arrivals". The internees bought food, such as bread and meat and other supplies from the village stores. Relations between the townspeople, new and old, were relatively harmonious. The vast majority of the internees spoke some English due to their maritime background and could converse relatively well with the local people. Berrima also played host to families of the internees. They rented houses in the village and there began more interaction with the community, with internees often helping out in the community where needed. A school was set up in a slab hut for the children as evidenced in a photograph showing children, teacher and a sign "Tochterschule Berrima 1917".

The Winagecarribee River played an important role in the daily lives of the internees, providing many opportunities for swimming, fishing and boating along its course. The river winds its way through the Moss Vale and Berrima, around the cliff face below the rear of the town's jail and then flows eleven kilometres downstream. The bank of the river was reasonably heavily wooded in 1915 with native shrubs and grasses as well as tea trees. Platypuses were plentiful in the river up until the 1940s when the exotic Willow took over the banks of the river.

Wide, deep water pools also were a feature at various points along the twisting waterway. One such pool was located just downstream from the jail. This area was a popular swimming hole for not just the internees but also the villagers and the many visitors to Berrima. The internees named this pool Grosse See, meaning Great Lake and being close to the jail, it was a major place of activity for them. A half kilometre west from this water hole was another deeper wider pool that the internees used extensively. This pool was given the name Lake Titicaca.

To provide better water-based amenities for themselves the internees turned their hand at altering the waterway. From local rocks and clay they constructed a dam downstream from Lake Titicaca which raised the water levels in the water hole and the river upstream from it by one metre. Damming the river was a plan that the villagers had hoped that the Administration would have embarked on for many years previous to the construction by the internees.

Utilising the river for swimming was an instantly popular recreational activity amongst the internees. They swam from the sandy beaches in the river's coves and erected diving platforms around the deeper water holes. Boating was also a big feature of life on the river with Venetian carnivals being held along with competitive water sports and other such events. Being experienced seamen, the idea of building a boat was not a daunting task. Simple canoes were constructed as well as fleets of elaborately built and decorated rowing and sailing boats. One notable carnival reported in the local newspapers was a "mock battle" staged by the Berrima Guard, where two watercraft representing the SMS Emden and HMAS Sydney fought it out on the waters of Lake Titicaca close to the Hansa Bridge. The carnivals were usually held on culturally important days, such as the birthdays of German royalty.

The river environs were significantly important for the internees well-being. To escape the confined spaces of the jail that they suffered during the evening, many of the industrious internees soon after arriving at Berrima, constructed simple small huts from tea trees in the area. Brushwood branches and foliage were either tied or woven together to form the walls and roof. These initial huts, mainly constructed on the right side of the bank between the dam and Lake Titicaca, served both as private places during the daytime and also as shade structures during hot or windy weather.

To take advantage of the area along the left bank of the river which was sunnier, less rocky and boasted more fertile soils the internees designed and constructed a bridge across the river. Studying the rivers varying low and high-level marks, the mariners chose to construct a high-level bridge above the general flood level around the area in line with Oxley Street on the right bank and just downstream from the water hole known as the Great Lake. Constructed in three months from local timbers the bridge was officially opened in July 1915 and named Hansa Bridge. The naming of the bridge is significant in that it makes reference to the shipping company HANSA line and pays homage to the maritime history of the Hanseatic League and the confederate cities of north Germany 1260–1600.

From photographic evidence, John Simmons wrote that there may have been a second bridge built next to Lake Titicaca's dam wall. Simmons also noted that a few weeks after the opening of the bridge the internees constructed a large waterslide 30 metres upstream from the new bridge on the right bank that was reminiscent of an "American style water chute".

After the bridge was constructed more huts were built, mostly on the left bank downstream from the Hansa Bridge. Some were simple brushwood and bark structures, others were built from galvanised iron sheets or flattened kerosene tins. Several more elaborate huts and cabins were constructed. One particular cabin of importance was Alsterburg, which was elaborately constructed from logs and was reminiscent of Germany's Black Forest cabins in design.

The huts and cabins were given names and tended to be grouped as in small villages. Realising that the war was to continue for some years and with having experienced Berrima's cold winter months, some of the huts were extended and improved. Also many more internees took to building huts with the peak construction period being the summer of 1916–17 with several resembling a European summer villa or lodge using eucalypt logs. One such cabin was built by NGL officers Rudolf Carstens and Richard Preiss, who also turned their hand to performing in the internee's theatre productions.

Most huts housed just a few men, however, there were huts that served as clubhouses, such as the Sorgenfrei (Carefree), which was the Swimming Club. Another communal hut, the Lloydhalle 2, was for the use of the younger men from the NGL Line.

The cultural lives of the internees were enriched by regular theatrical and musical performances by fellow internees. A stage platform was built in a natural amphitheatre area just downstream from the first bend of the river on the left bank side. Another important enhancement was the building of a bakehouse not far from the amphitheatre where German-style pies, cakes and pastries were made and sold. The Bakehouse was built by Henrich Bartels from the HANSA line.

A particularly successful entrepreneurial undertaking by the internees was the establishment of vegetable gardens. From its small beginnings during the first year, by 1917 the vegetable plots had grown from a few small gardens within the jail and just outside the jail to the establishment of impressive plots around the huts on the riverbanks. The produce was sold to the camp's kitchen and if there was an oversupply, the internees also sold the produce to the villagers. Such was the success of this enterprise that soon the internees with an agricultural bent rented local fields and some of the old orchards in Berrima and set to work on preparing the land for large crops of vegetables and fruit.

Word spread quickly beyond Berrima about what the Germans or "Huns" were creating and soon many visitors started arriving in Berrima to witness the Germanic structures that were created and how they lived. With the curiosity of the visitors also came vandalism and antagonism. Some resented the perceived privileges that were afforded to the "Huns". As a result, a high wire fence cordoning off an area of up to 20 acres on the left bank of the river for use by internees only was constructed to provide more privacy and protection for the internees. It became necessary for the internees to patrol the areas that they recreated to safeguard the watercraft and huts that they had built. Hostility by the local residents towards the internees also grew as the attitude of wartime hysteria increased.

Between 1915 and 1919 up to 400 Germans were interned at Berrima. After spending four years living as "enemy aliens", a formal declaration was finally signed by Germany that officially ended WWI in June 1919. Although an armistice was called for and received, German internees in Australia had to wait months until they could be repatriated when this official declaration was signed. The first group to be repatriated was prisoners of war. This included a small group of internees from the Berrima camp. The remaining internees had to suffer many weeks of postponement and changing regulations as to their departure details and allowances. Adding to their growing frustration about the delays was the news that a monument to commemorate the deaths of four German Trial Bay internees had been vandalised and then completely destroyed. This prompted a reaction of the Berrima internees to leave nothing of their works behind, including huts and watercraft. They immediately retaliated by sinking their watercraft, digging up their garden beds and burning their huts.

On 12 August 1919, the remaining internees loaded the waiting wagons with their most treasured possessions and were marched through Berrima towards Moss Vale where they were to be transported by train to Sydney. Here they boarded SS Ypiranga bound for Rotterdam and finally transported back home to Germany.

== Description ==
The Berrima Internment Camp Huts Area includes 42.66-hectare section of bush and pastureland along the north and south banks of the Wingecarribee River downstream of the Berrima Gaol. It also includes a section of the river. It was here that the Germans interned at the jail built a large complex of huts and other items such as watercraft, boatsheds, mooring posts, jetties and bridges to facilitate their daytime activities while in detention. These activities included gardening, picnicking, pursuing sporting and water related activities such as boating and swimming, rehearsing plays and musical performances or just relaxing.

There were thought to be approximately 14 huts on the northern side of the river and around 27 huts located on the southern side of the river. Initially, the huts were constructed of brush and were not much more than primitive shelters located on the banks of the Wingebarribee River.

As the war lengthened and the internees became resigned to a long stay in the camp they began to construct more substantial structures of timber slab and/or bark with rubble stone foundations. The gaps between the timber slabs or bark slabs were plugged with termite mud. The roofs of some huts were thatched with grasses, which as could be expected, did not guarantee a waterproof abode. Other huts used bark or timber slabs or scavenged corrugated iron for roofing materials.

Some internees made elaborate, European-style cabins out of eucalyptus logs, once again plugged and internally lined with termite mud. The more substantial huts were located further back from the river and often were situated to capture the most attractive views of the river.

These sturdy cabins and villas often required significant amounts of money to purchase materials. Other internees possibly with fewer financial resources used their ingenuity to design and construct houses out of materials at hand such as flattened kerosene tins or found sheets of galvanized iron. One hut was constructed completely from bundles of newspapers, which surprisingly lasted a number of years after the camp was disbanded. Another was constructed of "10,100 clay-filled jam and milk tins".

At the end of the war prior to being repatriated and in response to the news that locals had desecrated the German memorial at Trial Bay, the Berrima internees determined that they would destroy their hand-crafted watercraft and huts. While some of these artefacts were destroyed at the time a number of the huts remained intact for a number of years. Some of the watercraft had been sold to locals and one that had been sunk was discovered in 1978, buried in a sandbar (Cosmos Archaeology, WWI German Built Watercraft on the Wingecarribee River. Archaeology Impact Assessment). There is evidence of further watercraft (up to 13 in total) in the bed of the river. The listing also includes a collection of associated moveable heritage located at the Berrima Museum and at the Berrima District Historical Archives in Mittagong.

Moveable heritage items include:

- Carved Box c. 1915–18
- Gaol Cell Door c. 1840s
- D.A.D.G. Banner c. 1916
- Dolls House c. 1915–19
- Framed memento of 20th Berrima Guard April 1916
- German Merchant Officer's Service Record Book 1909–1915
- Serviette Rings 1916
- Carved Wooden Shield May 1916
- Carved Wooden Shield c. 1917
- Dugour Canoe
- Concert Zither c. 1900
- Collection of historic photographs of the Internees and their activities on site circa 1915-1919

== Condition ==
Evidence of the huts that remain on site includes numerous stone rubble platforms and retaining walls on which huts would have been constructed. A number of these are located on the northern side of the river, both on the banks close to the water and further back commanding picturesque views of the river. During a site visit, at least 10 potential sites were identified and it is expected that more could be identified on an intensive and methodical inspection. A typical example of these foundations located on the site visit was that of Alsterberg Hut which as well as the rubble foundation platform (approx 4×6 metres) has a set of steps carved in rock leading to the porch area and evidence of stone rubble retaining walls.

As well as these foundation sites there are also a number of natural rock platforms with evidence of fixings or postholes for huts. These are located on both the northern and southern banks of the river. In addition, an item that is likely to have been a mooring post is located on the southern bank of the river approaching Lake Titicaca, a large pool in the river where it bends to turn north upstream of the internee constructed dam. On the southern banks of Lake Titicaca is located a pile of bricks that have been disturbed by wombat activity.

In addition to the huts, moorings and jetties the internees built a bridge across the river that they named Hansa Bridge. It was located directly south of the end of Oxley St on the northern side of the river and spanned the river to a continuation of Oxley St which no longer exists although is evident in maps of the town layout. No evidence of the bridge was uncovered on the site visit but archaeological evidence may exist. The remains of the huts' foundations are extensive and many are easily identified in the landscape.

== Heritage listing ==
The Berrima Internment Group is of state heritage significance for its unique historical values as a place where German Mariners were interned between 1915 and 1919 during the course of WWI. The remains contained in the precinct, including those of the huts, recreation facilities, submerged watercraft and moveable heritage associated with the site, clearly tell the story of the lives of those internees and their efforts to retain cultural identity and practices during their period of confinement.

The precinct provides a tangible link to an important phase of Australian history and demonstrates how Australians regarded and dealt with enemies of the British Commonwealth and also demonstrates Australia's relationship with Britain at the time.

Being the site of internment for German sailors and Naval personnel it demonstrates the way in which classes of "enemy alien" were segregated as a matter of government policy.

In addition to the historic values of the place its State heritage significance is enhanced through its association with the crew of the SMS Emden and its archaeological research potential will provide a wealth of information on the method of construction of the huts, the layout of the precinct including gardens, the lifestyle and customs of the large group of "enemy aliens" interned at Berrima during World War I.

The Huts Precinct is a rare and representative example of a recreation area constructed by German Internees while confined in an internment camp during WWI. It is also the only camp in NSW to exclusively house German Mariners detained during WWI.

Berrima Internment was listed on the New South Wales State Heritage Register on 14 January 2011 having satisfied the following criteria.

The place is important in demonstrating the course, or pattern, of cultural or natural history in New South Wales.

The Berrima Internment Camp Huts Area is of state heritage significance for its historical values as a place where "enemy aliens" were interned between 1915 and 1919 during the course of WWI.

The remains of the Huts Precinct including the foundations of huts, boat sheds, jetties, etc. comprise a cultural precinct established in the Australian bush around the Wingecarribee River, Berrima which tells the story of the lives and occupations of the German internees while confined. This historic landmark with its archaeological remains reveals the unique lifestyle of this group of people and their determination to retain and express their cultural identity and practices while confined as "enemy aliens" in Australia. The area provides a tangible link to an important phase of Australian history and demonstrates how Australians regarded and dealt with enemies of the British Commonwealth and also demonstrates Australia's relationship with Britain at the time.

A significant part of this story is demonstrated by the way in which relations between the Internees and villagers changed during the course of the war. It appears that the internees initially at least seemed to be relatively integrated into the community as they were free to wander in a 2-mile radius of the jail and purchased goods from local shops and often lent assistance to locals. This seemed to change as the numbers of internees grew and the conflict in Europe was prolonged.

Being the site of internment for predominantly sailors and Naval personnel it demonstrates the way in which classes of "enemy alien" were segregated as a matter of government policy. The largest of the camps, Holsworthy Internment Camp was a centralised camp where Germans from all over Australia were interned. From there those Germans of the business and professional class and those from other British Territories were sent to Trial Bay Gaol, German Mariners were sent to Berrima Internment Camp, families were sent to Bourke, and others were sent to Molongolo.

The place has a strong or special association with a person, or group of persons, of importance of cultural or natural history of New South Wales's history.

The significance of the Huts Precinct of the Berrima Internment Camp is enhanced through its association with a number of the crew of the notorious German Merchant Navy ship, the SMS Emden. Under the command of the ingenious and daring Captain von Muller, the SMS Emden inflicted a great deal of damage to allied merchant shipping during the early months of the war. Its activities were finally curtailed by the Australian naval vessel, HMAS Sydney on 9 November 1912. Seven of the Emden crew who were injured during capture were interned at Berrima Internment Camp for the duration of the war.

The place is important in demonstrating aesthetic characteristics and/or a high degree of creative or technical achievement in New South Wales.

The Huts Area at the Berrima Internment Camp is of aesthetic significance at a State level as it shows evidence of a unique cultural precinct with a notably European layout and design, similar to the summer houses of continental Europe, set in the Australian bush at Berrima.

In Europe at that time it was a common practice to establish "summer houses" complete with plot of land for growing vegetables and flowers.

While the huts no longer remain, the ruins, foundations, platforms, cellar and other remains contribute to a visually distinctive natural and cultural landscape on the banks of the Wingecarribee River. .

The place has strong or special association with a particular community or cultural group in New South Wales for social, cultural or spiritual reasons.

The heritage significance of the Berrima Internment Camp Huts Area at a state level is enhanced through its importance to the German community in NSW. The place tells an important story in this group's history in NSW and Australia.

The place also has a special association with the local Berrima Community and descendants of those who resided there between 1915 and 1919. The story of the German internees and the interaction between residents and the internees at Berrima is an important part of their own local history that is intertwined with the larger history of NSW.

The place has potential to yield information that will contribute to an understanding of the cultural or natural history of New South Wales.

The place is of State heritage significance for its large archaeological resource which will, on further investigation, provide a wealth of information on the method of construction of the huts, the layout of the precinct including gardens, the lifestyle and customs of the large group of German "enemy aliens" interned at Berrima during WWI. It will contribute significantly to the understanding of this group of people, their experience and determination to maintain their cultural identity and practices in NSW during their wartime confinement and to our understanding of the wartime history of NSW.

The place possesses uncommon, rare or endangered aspects of the cultural or natural history of New South Wales.

The remains contained in the Huts Area at the Berrima Internment Camp is of State heritage significance as evidence of a rare and unique example of a European summer house style collection of huts, gardens and infrastructure to facilitate water-based and other activities established by a group of German Internees during WWI. The village of huts and the activities carried out there ensured that the group maintained and expressed its German identity. While at other camps such as Trial Bay Gaol the German internees constructed shelters and items to facilitate the passing of time and expression of culture, the land area utilised and facilities constructed were not as extensive as those in Berrima and the remains are not as intact and indicative of the original layout.

Its rarity values extend to the fact that Berrima was the only WWI Internment Camp to house German mariners with a large percentage of these being of the middle to high level ranks.

The place is important in demonstrating the principal characteristics of a class of cultural or natural places/environments in New South Wales.

The remains of the Huts Area at Berrima Internment Camp are representative of a recreation precinct built by WWI German Internees during their confinement in a NSW German Internment Camp. The intactness of its archaeological remains demonstrate the principal characteristics of a village modeled on the idea of the continental European summerhouse, where householders from urban areas leased or owned small plots of land on which they built "summerhouses" and tended vegetable and flower gardens.
