= David Grundie =

Australian rugby league footballer

Personal information
- Full name: David Grundie
- Born: 2 August 1883 Berrima, New South Wales, Australia
- Died: 1 September 1937 (aged 54) Maitland, New South Wales, Australia

Playing information
- Position: Second-row, Lock
Club
Years	Team	Pld	T	G	FG	P
1910–13	Newtown	50	11	0	0	33
Representative
Years	Team	Pld	T	G	FG	P
1911–12	New South Wales	2	1	0	0	3

David Grundie (1883-1937) was a pioneer Australian rugby league footballer who played in the 1910s. He played for Newtown in the New South Wales Rugby League (NSWRL) competition as a second-row but he also played as a lock.

== Playing career ==
Grundie made his first grade debut in 1910 the same year that Newtown claimed their first ever premiership drawing 4–4 with South Sydney in the 1910 NSWRL grand final. Newtown won the premiership due to the fact that they finished first during the regular season as minor premiers and were declared premiership winners. Grundie played a further three seasons before retiring at the end of 1913. Grundie also represented New South Wales on two occasions scoring one try.
