= Berrima House =

- Location within New South Wales Location within Australia
- 34.4903°S 150.3317°E
- Location: 19 Jellore Street, Berrima, Wingecarribee Shire, New South Wales, Australia

History
- Built: 1835–

New South Wales Heritage Register
- Official name: Berrima House
- Type: state heritage (built)
- Designated: 2 April 1999
- Reference no.: 95
- Type: House
- Category: Residential buildings (private)

Berrima House is a heritage-listed residence at 19 Jellore Street, Berrima, in the Southern Highlands of New South Wales, Australia. It was built in 1835. It was added to the New South Wales State Heritage Register on 2 April 1999.

== History ==
Berrima House was built in 1835. It is reputed to be the first wooden stone house built in Berrima.

The wooden settee on the verandah of Berrima House is noteworthy as a reputed resting place of Ben Hall, who is said to have slept there in 1864.

== Description ==
Berrima House is a two-storey random coursed stone building (rendered under verandah on ground floor and marked out in stone work joints). It has a single storey verandah to front elevation with timber posts, scalloped valance and flagged sandstone floor. The ground floor contains three rooms, along with a non-original kitchen extension, while the upper floor has four rooms accessed by the original timber staircase.

The windows have stone lintels and sills. All original sash windows have been replaced, along with the front door. It features a hipped roof with boxed eaves and cedar board lining. The house is set among large deciduous trees and has a fine hedge across the street frontage.

The verandah has possibly been replaced and the original outbuildings removed.

== Significance ==
Berrima House is significant through associations with the local community of Berrima and as an early representative of the development of the town generally and its more substantial residences in particular. A building valued by the local community as one of the earliest substantial residences in Berrima and still retaining in its overall form and some original detailing characteristic of Colonial-Georgian townhouses. It is also part of a group of residences in Berrima of Georgian-Colonial style built during the early years of settlement of the town. Its significance is compromised by the loss of original fabric, such as windows and the front door.

== Heritage listing ==
Berrima House was listed on the New South Wales State Heritage Register on 2 April 1999.
