= Berrima, New South Wales =

Berrima
- Town
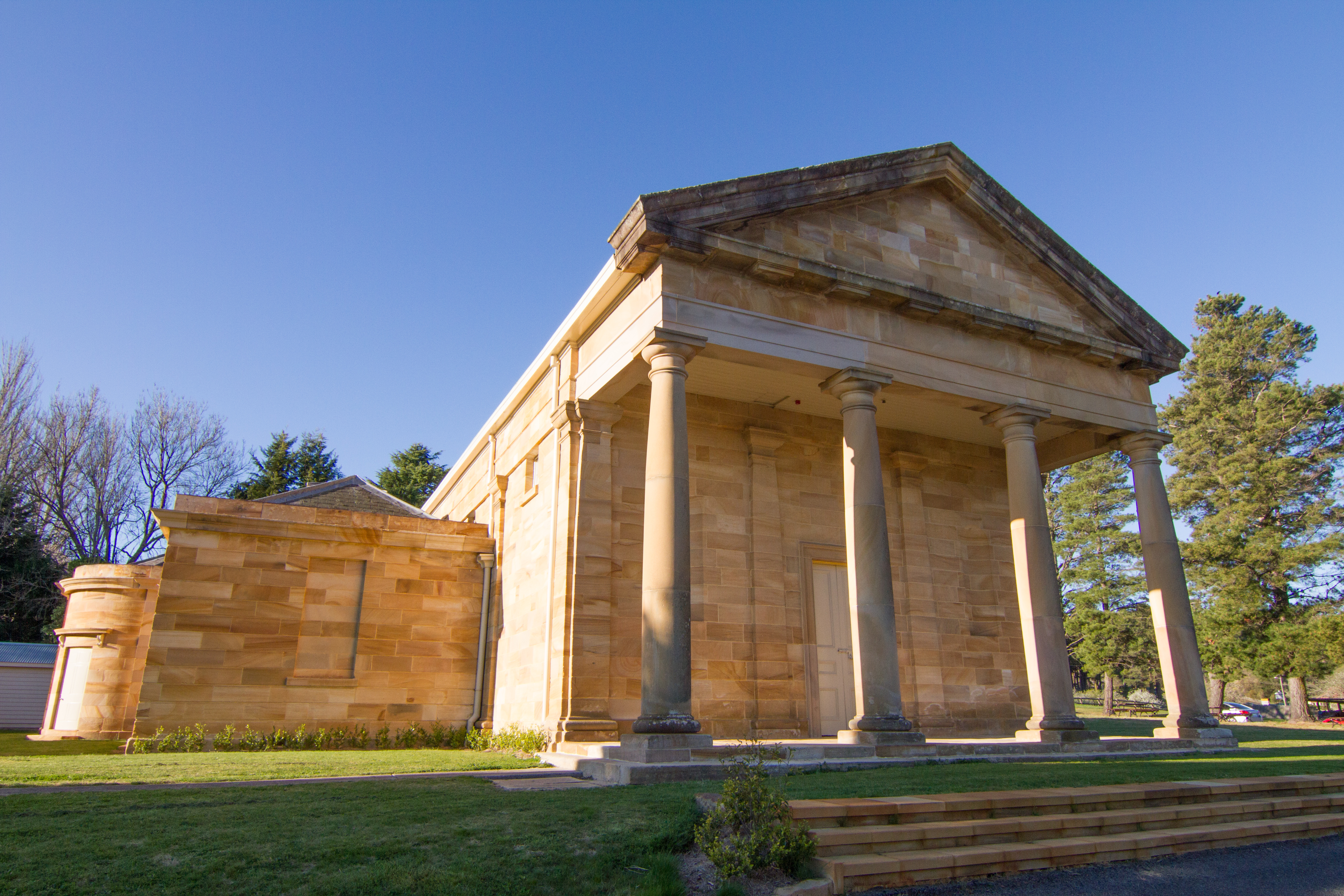
- Historic court house in Berrima (completed 1838)

- Coordinates: 34°29′S 150°21′E
- Country: Australia
- State: New South Wales
- Region: Southern Highlands
- LGA: Wingecarribee Shire
- Location: 130 km (81 mi) from Sydney; 75 km (47 mi) from Goulburn; 11 km (6.8 mi) from Bowral
- Established: 1830

Government
  - State electorate: Goulburn
  - Federal division: Whitlam
- Elevation: 659 m (2,162 ft)

Population
  - Total: 255 (UCL 2021)
- Postcode: 2577
- County: Camden
- Parish: Berrima
Localities around Berrima
Mandemar	High Range	Woodlands
Joadja	Berrima	Bowral
Medway	New Berrima	Moss Vale

Berrima (/bɛrəmə/) is a historic village in the Southern Highlands of New South Wales, Australia, in Wingecarribee Shire. The village, once a major town, is located on the Old Hume Highway between Sydney and Canberra. It was previously known officially as the Town of Berrima. It is close to the three major towns of the Southern Highlands: Mittagong, Bowral and Moss Vale.

== Etymology ==
The name Berrima is believed to derive from an Aboriginal word meaning either "southward" or "black swan".

== History ==
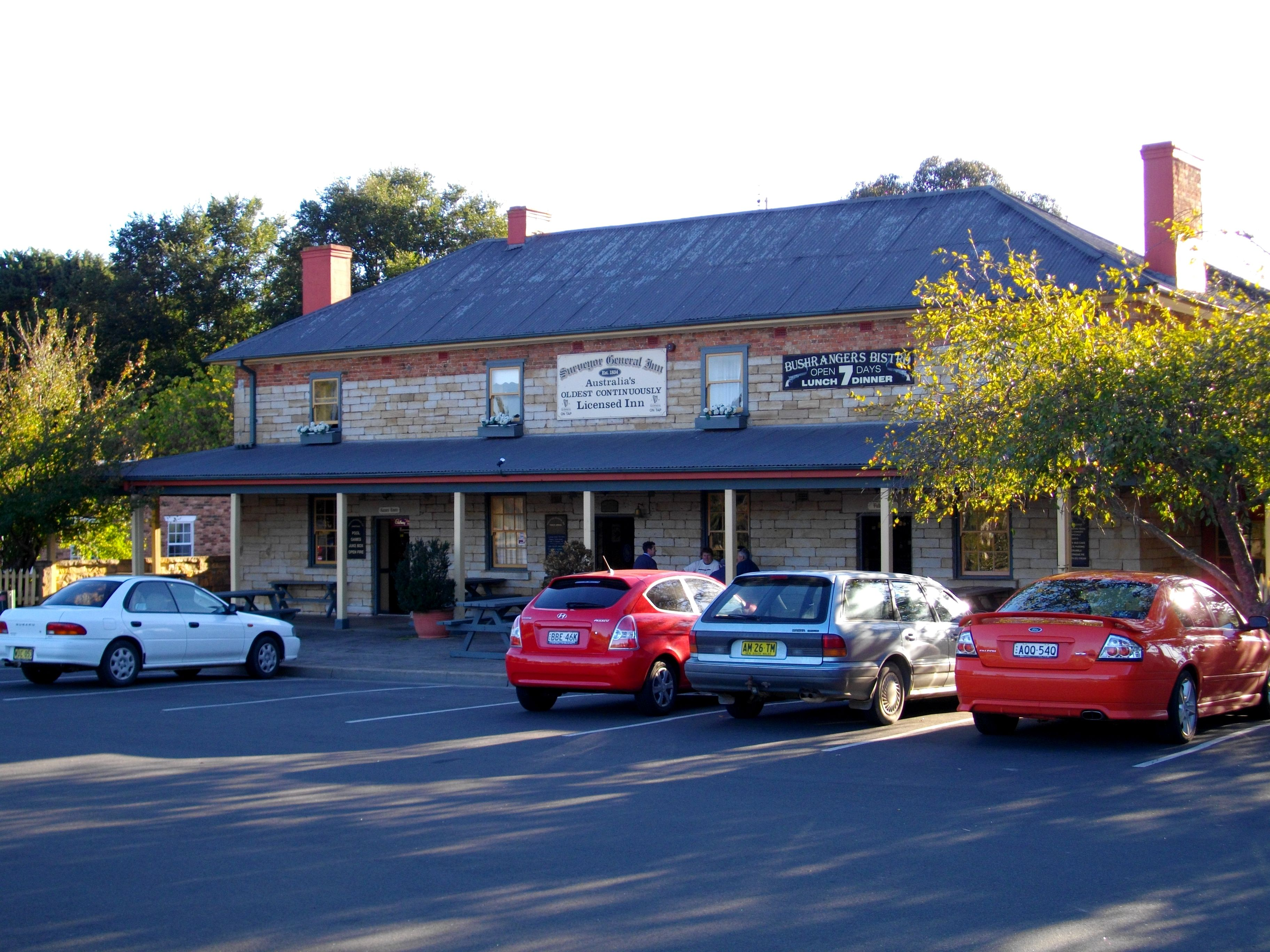
The Surveyor General Inn at Berrima was established in 1834

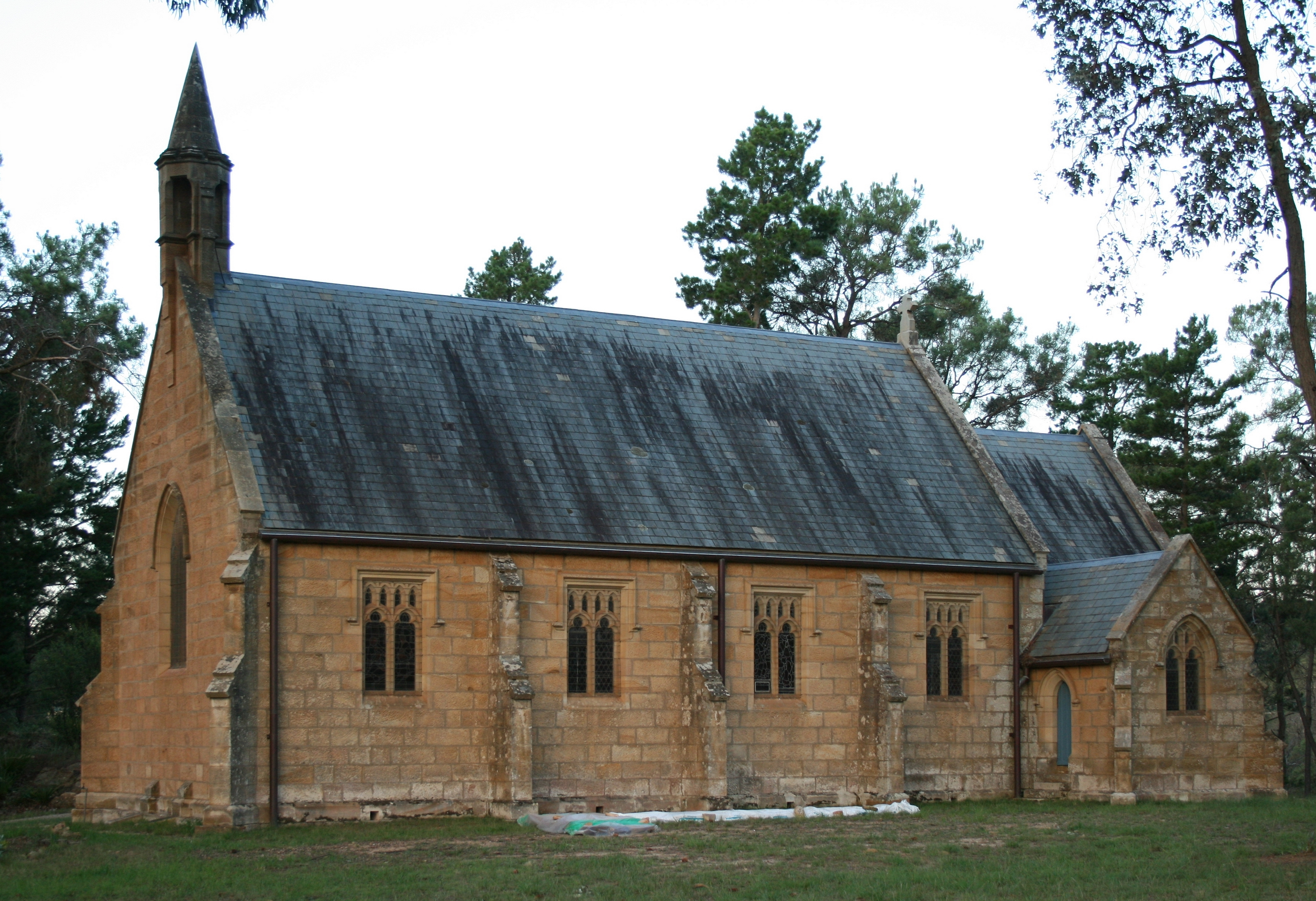
Holy Trinity Anglican Church

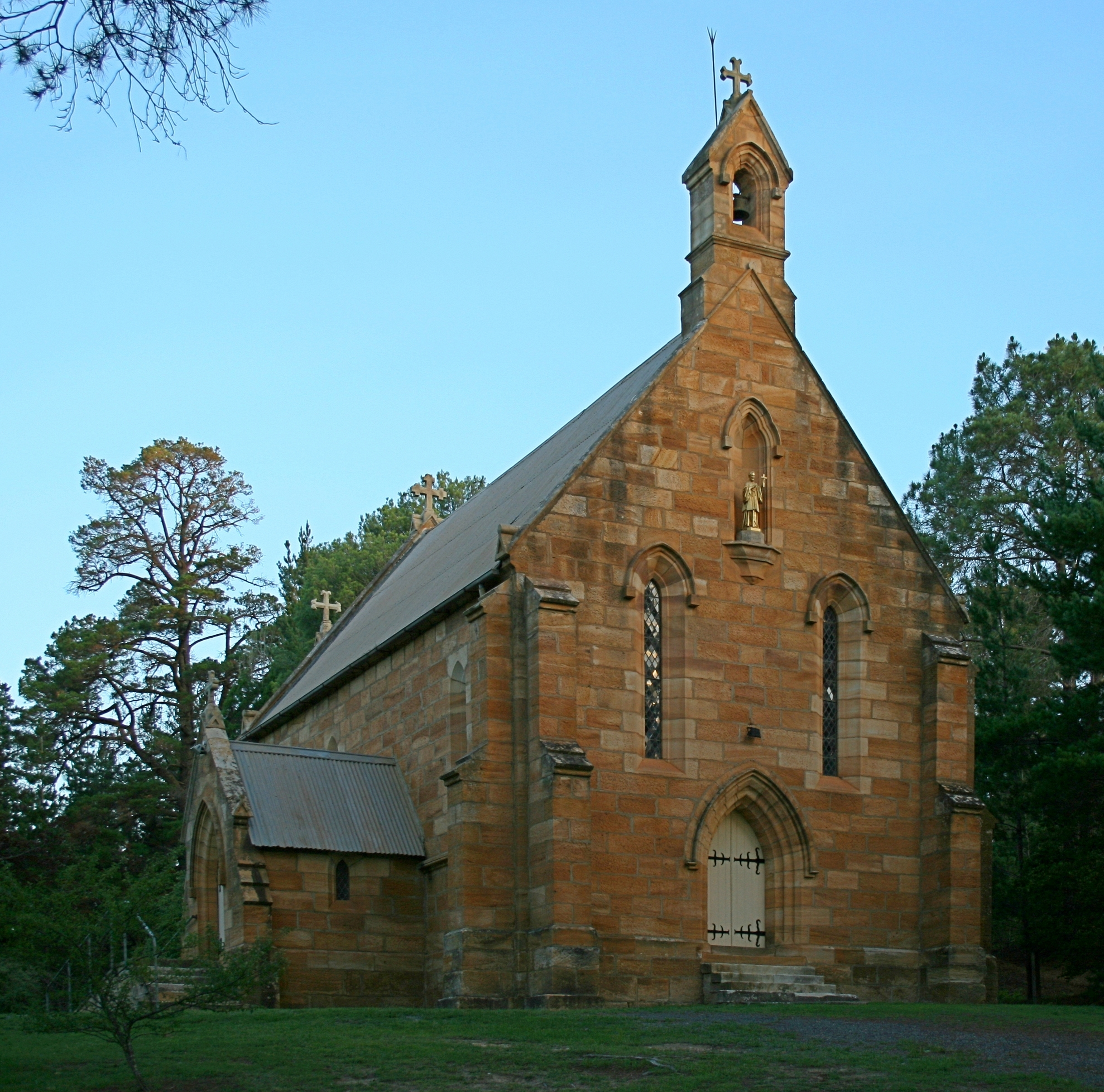
St. Francis Xavier Catholic Church

The area around Berrima was once occupied by the Dharawal Aboriginal people.

The region and Wingecarribee River was first visited by Europeans during the late 1790s, including a 1798 expedition led by an ex-convict, John Wilson. However, John and Hamilton Hume rediscovered the area in 1814. The area was explored by Charles Throsby in 1818. Runs were taken up soon after, including by one by Charles Throsby. Harper's Mansion, which is on a hill overlooking the town, was built from 1829 to 1830. Bong Bong had been planned as a major town for the county but, as it was flood prone, the New South Wales surveyor-general Thomas Mitchell chose Berrima townsite on the road running south from Sydney to Goulburn with the intention that the town be the chief centre for southern New South Wales. The survey was conducted in 1830 and the town plan was approved in 1831. As well as its being an administrative centre, there were ambitions that the town might become a commercial and manufacturing centre, "where the wool of Argyle and Camden might be made into cloth and the hide into leather".

Berrima Court House was built between 1833 and 1838. Berrima Gaol was built from 1835 by convict labour and opened in 1839. The Surveyor General Inn was built in 1834. It has been continuously licensed since 1839 and its claim to being the earliest hotel rests on its continual licence and being in the original building. Berrima prospered as being at a point on the Old Hume Highway, and there were fourteen hotels in or near the town in the 1840s. However, because the construction of the railway bypassed the town, the population decreased – no new houses were built for a hundred years. In 1896, Premier of New South Wales Henry Parkes, planted an oak tree near the post office.

There are many historic buildings in the town and the village as a whole is listed on the Register of the National Estate. Other notable buildings include the Holy Trinity Anglican Church designed by Edmund Blacket and built in 1849; and the St Francis Xavier Catholic Church built 1849–51 designed by Augustus Pugin, a notable British architect of Gothic-revival buildings. The Berrima Village Trust was established in 1963 to preserve historic buildings.

Berrima was bypassed by a new section of the Hume Highway in March 1989.

== Heritage listings ==
Berrima has a number of heritage-listed sites, including:

- Argyle Street: Berrima Gaol
- Argyle Street: Berrima Internment Camp Huts Area
- Argyle Street: Berrima Post Office
- Argyle Street: Holy Trinity Anglican Church
- Hume Highway: St Francis Xavier's Roman Catholic Church
- Jellore Street: Berrima Inn
- Jellore Street: Victoria Inn
- 12 Jellore Street: CBC Bank Building
- 16 Jellore Street: Jellore Cottage
- 19 Jellore Street: Berrima House
- 24 Jellore Street: Mail Coach Inn
- 5–7 Market Place: Magistrate's House
- Market Street: White Horse Inn
- 5 Market Street: Nurses Cottage
- Stockade Street: Makin Cottage
- Wilkinson Street: Harper's Mansion

== Berrima Court House ==
Berrima Court House was built between 1836 and 1838. It was designed by the colonial architect Mortimer Lewis in a Roman style. Four Doric columns support a classical pediment. The building is now stylistically classified as Georgian. It is built of sandstone. A number of problems arose during construction, the first architect having resigned and a succession of three builders being contracted.

The first quarter-sessions were held at the court house in 1841, and the first trial by jury in the colony of New South Wales was held here. The assize courts were continued for only seven years. In 1850 the district court moved to Goulburn, south of Berrima. Minor courts continued at Berrima until 1873. Notable trials were of John Lynch, who was hanged for the murder of at least nine people, and of Lucretia Dunkley and her lover Martin Beech who were both hanged in 1843 for the murder of Dunkley's husband. Their trial is simulated in the present-day museum courtroom with realistic manikins and an audio commentary. Dunkley was the only woman to be hanged at Berrima Gaol.

== Berrima Gaol ==
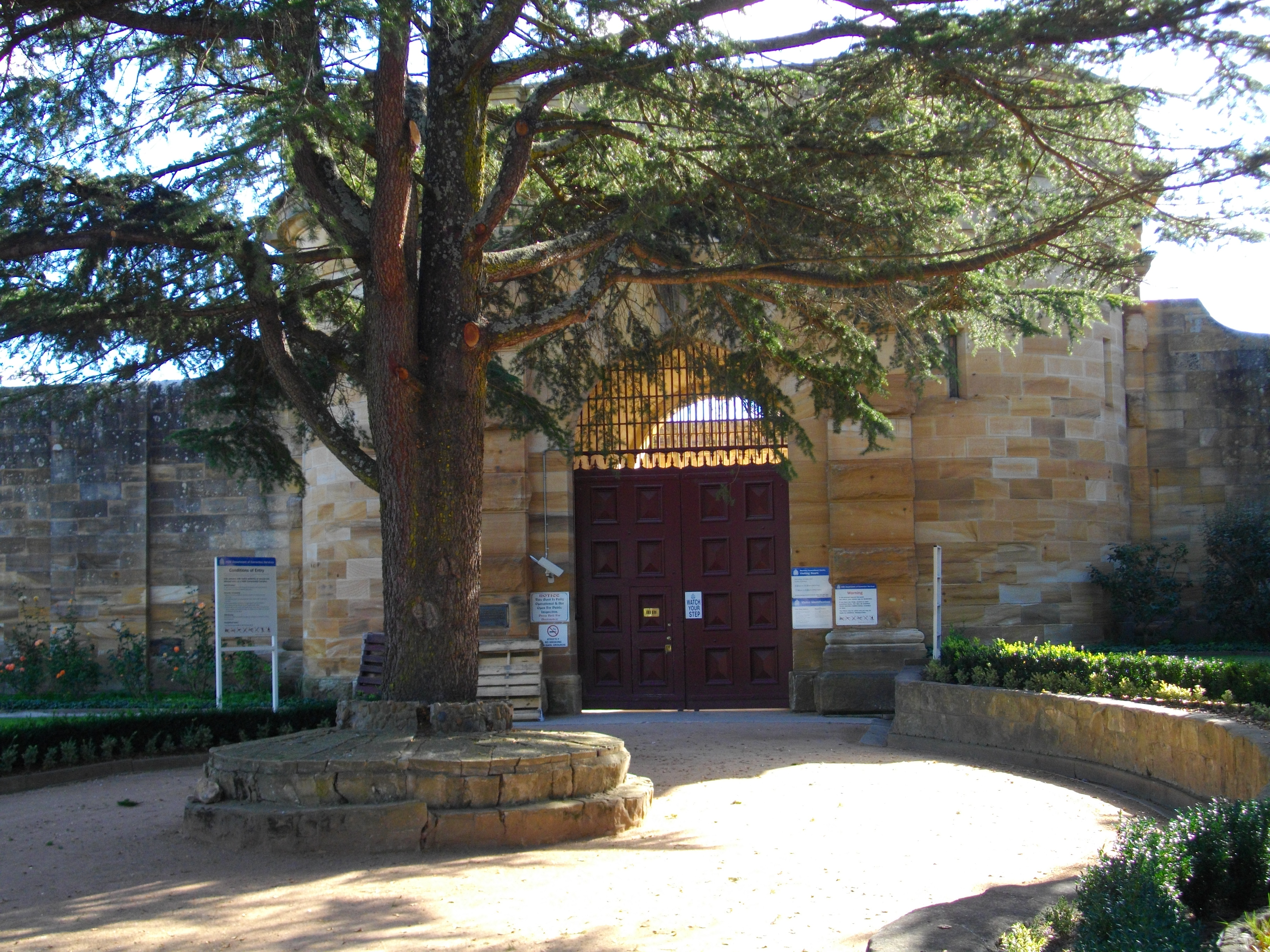
The old Berrima Gaol was, in its latter days, a training centre for female convicts

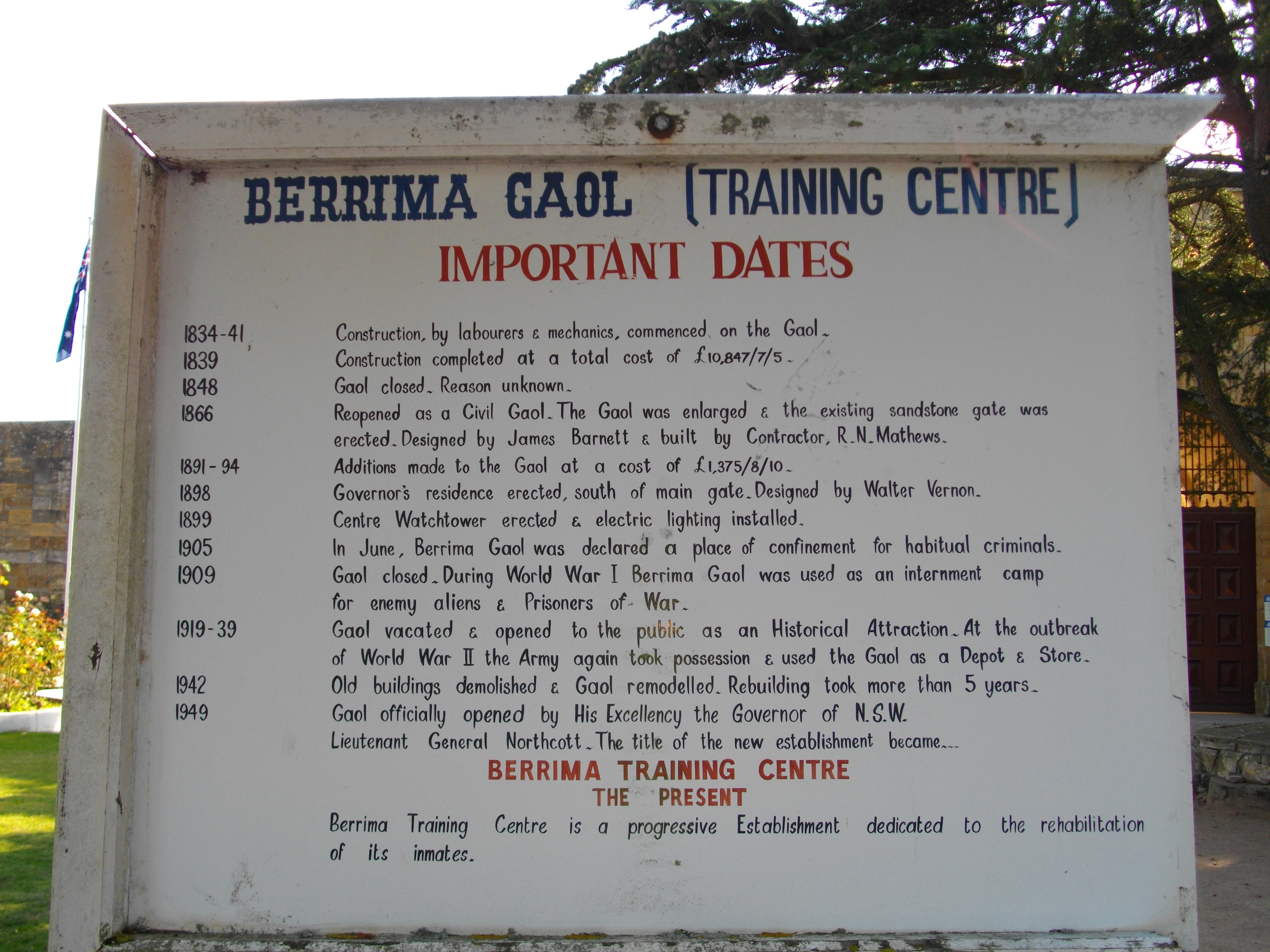
This notice outside Berrima Gaol outlines its historical timeline

Berrima Gaol was built over five years with much work done by convicts in irons. Conditions there were harsh; prisoners spent most of their days in cells and the only light was through a small grate set in the door. In 1866, Berrima Gaol was renovated to the standards described by the prison reform movement for a "model prison". However, it had solitary confinement cells which measured 8 feet by 5 feet, some smaller, where it was intended that all prisoners spent one year. In 1877 a royal commission was held to investigate allegations of cruelty by the prison authorities but the complaints were not upheld.

During the First World War, the army used Berrima Gaol as a German-prisoner internment camp. Most of the 329 internees were enemy aliens from shipping companies. There were German officers from Rabaul, German New Guinea (what is now Papua New Guinea) and also officers from the light cruiser SMS Emden.

Berrima Gaol was rebuilt in the late 1940s following a fire. It closed permanently in 2020, after which most of the site was sold into private ownership.

== Population ==
At the 2021 census, 813 people were living in Berrima.

In the 2016 census, there were 666 people in Berrima. 73.8% of people were born in Australia and 85.1% of people only spoke English at home. The most common responses for religion were No Religion 29.8%, Anglican 25.9% and Catholic 17.1%.

== Notable residents ==
- Estelle Asmodelle, (born 1964), model, music composer and scientist, grew up in Berrima and left at age 16
- Louisa Atkinson, (1834–1872), naturalist and writer
- Jimmy Barnes, (born 1956), lead singer of Cold Chisel
- David Grundie, (1883–1937), rugby league player
- Geoff Harvey, (1935–2019), former musical director for the Nine Network
- Charles Metz, (1870–1945), politician
- Jerry Powell, (1852–1913), cricketer
- Leo Sayer, (born 1948), singer
- Keith Steele, (1951–2009), cricketer and lawyer
- Lesley Wylie, (1887–1959), rugby league player

== Bibliography ==
- Historic Berrima, New South Wales, 1831 (pamphlet). Business Houses of Berrima. 1988.
- Glover, Barbara (1984). Berrima, New South Wales. Moorabbin, Victoria: Scancolour (Australia).
