= Jerry Powell =

Australian cricketer

Personal information
- Full name: Theodore Powell
- Born: 10 July 1852; Berrima, New South Wales, Australia
- Died: 3 September 1913 (aged 61); Sydney, Australia
- Source: ESPNcricinfo, 15 January 2017

Jerry Powell (10 July 1852 – 3 September 1913) was an Australian cricketer. He played fifteen first-class matches for New South Wales between 1872/73 and 1884/85.

== See also ==
- List of New South Wales representative cricketers
