= White Horse Inn, Berrima =

White Horse Inn
- Location within New South Wales Location within Australia
- 34.4911°S 150.3338°E
- Location: Market Street, Berrima, Wingecarribee Shire, New South Wales, Australia

History
- Built: 1834–1850

New South Wales Heritage Register
- Official name: White Horse Inn, Commercial Bank of Australia, Rosebank, Oldbury's Inn, Holsberry Inn, Mail Coach Inn, Royal Mail Coach Inn
- Type: state heritage (built)
- Designated: 2 April 1999
- Reference no.: 106
- Type: Inn/tavern
- Category: Commercial
- Builders: Edward Davies

White Horse Inn is a heritage-listed former residence, inn, bank and restaurant at Market Street, Berrima, Wingecarribee Shire, New South Wales, Australia. It was built from 1834 to 1850 by Edward Davies. It is also known as Commercial Bank of Australia, Rosebank, Oldbury's Inn, Holsberry Inn, Mail Coach Inn, and Royal Mail Coach Inn. It was added to the New South Wales State Heritage Register on 2 April 1999.

== History ==
Berrima is the second oldest (European) settlement in Wingecarribee Shire and the oldest continuing settlement in the shire. The first town settlement in the district was in 1821 at Bong Bong, 8 km south-east of Berrima on the Wingecarribee River.

The site of Berrima was selected by Surveyor General Sir Thomas Mitchell in 1829 on a visit planning the route for a new road alignment from Sydney to replace the old Argyle Road, which had proven unsatisfactory due to a steep hill climb over the Mittagong Range and river crossing at Bong Bong. In 1830 Mitchell instructed Robert Hoddle to mark out the town based on a plan Mitchell's office prepared, along the lines of a traditional English village (with a central market place and as many blocks as possible facing onto the Wingecarribee River), and using the local Aboriginal name. The new line of road came through the town. Berrima was to be established as the commercial and administrative centre for the County of Camden.

Following the approval of Governor Bourke in 1831, the period 1824 to 1841 saw significant flourishing development as mail coaches changed their route to this new line of road. Early town lots were sold in 1833, predominantly to inn keepers and around Market Square, including the first town lot sales to Bryan McMahon.

Governor Bourke designated Berrima as a place for a courthouse and gaol to serve the southern part of the state. With construction of the jail from 1835 to 1839 and its courthouse in 1838 to serve the southern part of the state, the town flourished into the 1840s as mail coaches called, public buildings including churches were built in 1849 and 1851, and many hotels and coaching houses were established to serve local resident needs and passing trades, persons and commercial travellers. Its 1841 population was 249 with 37 houses completed and 7 more in construction. Research has indicated there were some 13 hotels or grog houses in Berrima at the one time in the early days before the coming of the Southern Railway to the Moss Vale area, which by-passed Berrima.

Michael Doyle and his wife operated the Mail Coach Inn at 22 Jellore Street from 1837 to 1839 as a licensed public house and staging post for travel and the delivery of mail. It was one of the first inns to operate in Berrima. In April 1838 the Doyles purchased Lots 2, 3 and 4 Section 1 and Lot 3 Section 4 (now known as the White Horse Inn) to expand their business including providing more accommodation for travellers and taking on the mail delivery service. In 1839 permission was granted to Doyle of the Mail Coach Inn (on Lot 2 Section 1, now called the Coach & Horses Inn, Jellore Street) to transfer his liquor licence to the opposite side of Market Square in 1839 to operate from the property he and his wife had purchased, the site now known as the White Horse Inn.

By the 1840s there were four licensed premises including the Berrima Inn, Surveyor General Inn, Mail Coach Inn and Crown Inn. Prior to the coming of the railway to the Moss Vale area, there were 13 hotels in Berrima. The first licensed inn for Berrima was the Berrima Inn, operated by Bryan McMahon, in 1834. Seven of the early hotel buildings remain today with the oldest (surviving) being the Surveyor General Inn, its first licence granted to James Harper on 29/6/1835. The Breen family, who later bought McMahon's Inn and the Coach & Horses Inn (unlicensed), were involved with two other hotels.

It is understood that the original stone Georgian inn was constructed between 1834 and 1850 during ownership of Edward Davies. It later became known as 'Oldbury's Inn' during the ownership of Ben Marshall Osborne. The building operated as a coaching inn in its early years and its original underground cellars were often used for the housing of convicts during their conscription to labour at Berrima Bridge and Berrima Gaol. In the early 1850s, a high pitched gabled roofed structure in Victorian Gothic revival style was added to the west of the 1834 building. Also at this time a two storey stone store room was added to the rear of the original building.

The 1851 census showed the number of buildings remained the same but the population had dropped to 192. During the 1850s Berrima experienced another boom period after the discovery of gold. When the Great Southern Railway bypassed Berrima in 1867 the town again began to decline as Mittagong, Moss Vale and Bowral developed. Berrima remained virtually unchanged for the next 100 years, preserving the town as an almost intact colonial village.

It is uncertain when the building was renamed the White Horse Inn. During its life the building has been used as a Commercial Bank of Australia as well as a private home known as Rosebank. The historic building operated as a restaurant and accommodation inn over many decades, later with separate motel accommodation.

The earlier freestanding coach house has been utilised for other commercial uses over time and was later used as part of the motel operations. In 1979 the coach house was substantially damaged by fire and was subsequently reconstructed and restored.

In 2013, the building was purchased by Reg Grundy and Joy Chambers.

== Description ==
=== Site ===
The setting of the White Horse Inn sets it apart from the Coach & Horses Inn (former) and the Berrima Inn (former) opposite. The two storey White Horse Inn sits prominently on the rise above the Old Hume Highway with high exposure to passing traffic. This constributes significantly to the aesthetic appreciation by the casual observer of the Berrima village and the predominantly Colonial/Victorian Georgian architecture of the village.

The site comprises an irregular shaped allotment approximately 5,914 metres in area that has frontage to Market Place and to the Wingecarribee River. Existing on the site are the White Horse Inn - a sandstone c. 1830s building and barn, stone coach house, c. 1970s motel and fibro outbuildings.

The site is traversed approximately half way down its length by a sewer main and the one in hundred year flood frequency level contour. The site is visible from the Berrima Market Place, the bridge over the Hume Highway and the opposite bank of the Wingecarribee River.

=== Inn (1834, extended 1850s and 1970s) ===
The inn is a large, two storey building with sandstone block walls and a corrugated iron roof. It has a two storey timber verandah on the street frontage. The facade is formally coursed sandstone with well-proportioned windows and doors typical of the Georgian/Regency architectural style. It generally has a high level of architectural detail.

=== Coach House (1865; rebuilt/restored 1979) ===
To the south east of the Inn is the "coach house", a similarly constructed building to the inn.

=== Motel ===
Behind both Inn and Coach House, c.40m from the frontage, is a 1980s single storey four room motel in fibro and brick with a tile roof.

== Heritage listing ==
The White Horse Inn is significant because it retains the evidence of the period of the early settlement of Berrima when convicts were locked in its cellar at night. It has associations with important phases in the foundation and growth of Berrima because of its various uses over time to the present day and in particular, its use as a coaching inn and traveller's hotel. It is a sizable and well detailed early building which shows the prosperity and early pretensions to style. Much important early fabric remains and the essential original form of its Georgian styling is relatively intact. It is also valued by the community as a prominent building in the Marketplace contributing to the historic character of Berrima.

White Horse Inn was listed on the New South Wales State Heritage Register on 2 April 1999.
