= Fred Croot =

English footballer

Personal information
- Full name: Frederick Richard Croot
- Date of birth: 30 November 1885
- Place of birth: Little Harrowden, England
- Date of death: 1958 (aged 72–73)
- Height: 5 ft 8 in (1.73 m)
- Position: Winger

Senior career*
Years	Team	Apps	(Gls)
1904–1905	Wellingborough		
1905–1907	Sheffield United	8	(0)
1907–1915	Leeds City	218	(38)
1916–1917	Stevenston United		
1916	→ Rangers (loan)		
1917	Clydebank		
Total		226	(38)
- * Club domestic league appearances and goals

Frederick Richard Croot (30 November 1885 – 1958) was an English footballer who played in the Football League for Leeds City and Sheffield United.
