= Holy Trinity Anglican Church, Berrima =

Holy Trinity Anglican Church
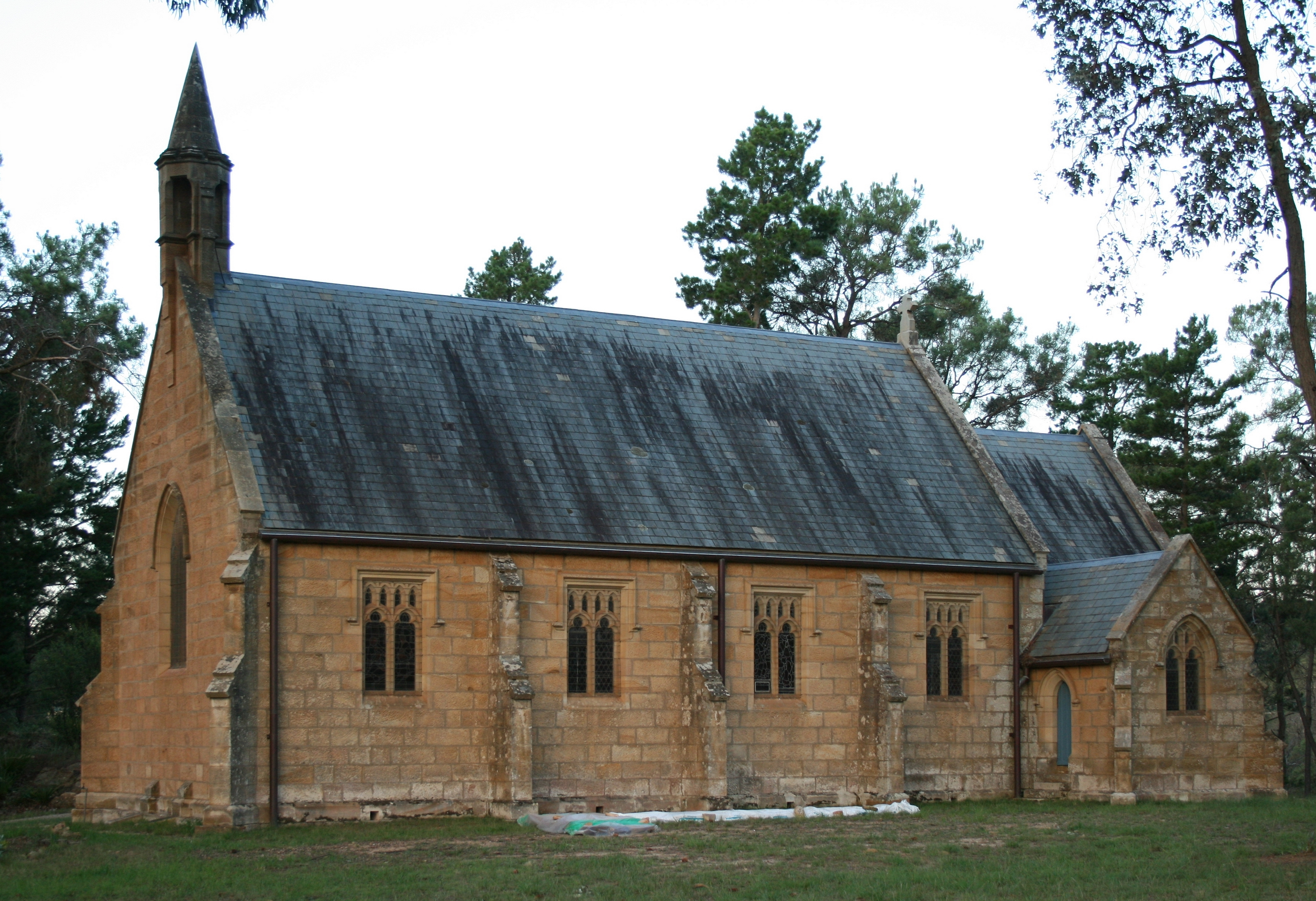
- Holy Trinity Anglican Church, pictured in 2010

- Location in New South Wales
- 34°29′25″S 150°20′12″E
- Location: Argyle Street, Berrima, Wingecarribee Shire, New South Wales
- Country: Australia
- Denomination: Anglican
- Website: sydneyanglicans.net/findachurch/holy_trinity_berrima_cum_moss_vale

History
- Status: Church
- Founded: 7 April 1847
- Founder: Bishop William Broughton
- Dedication: Holy Trinity
- Consecrated: 9 June 1849

Architecture
- Functional status: Active
- Architect: Edmund Blacket
- Architectural type: Victorian Gothic Revival
- Years built: 1849–

Specifications
- Materials: Sandstone

Administration
- Diocese: Sydney
- Parish: Berrima

New South Wales Heritage Register
- Official name: Church of Holy Trinity
- Type: State heritage (built)
- Designated: 2 April 1999
- Reference no.: 96
- Type: Church
- Category: Religion

Holy Trinity Anglican Church is a heritage-listed Anglican church at Argyle Street, Berrima, Wingecarribee Shire, New South Wales, Australia. It was designed by Edmund Blacket and built from 1849. The property is owned by the Anglican Church Property Trust. It was added to the New South Wales State Heritage Register on 2 April 1999.

== History ==
Berrima is the second oldest European settlement in Wingecarribee Shire and the oldest continuing settlement in the shire. The first town settlement in the district was in 1821 at Bong Bong, 8 kilometres (5.0 mi) south-east of Berrima on the Wingecarribee River.

The site of Berrima was selected by Surveyor General Sir Thomas Mitchell in 1829 on a visit planning the route for a new road alignment from Sydney to replace the old Argyle Road, which had proven unsatisfactory due to a steep hill climb over the Mittagong Range and river crossing at Bong Bong. In 1830 Mitchell instructed Robert Hoddle to mark out the town based on a plan Mitchell's office prepared, along the lines of a traditional English village (with a central market place and as many blocks as possible facing onto the Wingecarribee River), and using the local Aboriginal name. The new line of road came through the town. Berrima was to be established as the commercial and administrative centre for the County of Camden.

Following the approval of Governor Bourke in 1831, the period 1824 to 1841 saw significant flourishing development as mail coaches changed their route to this new line of road. Early town lots were sold in 1833, predominantly to inn keepers and around Market Square, including the first town Lot sales to Bryan McMahon.

Governor Bourke designated Berrima as a place for a courthouse and gaol to serve the southern part of the state. With construction of the gaol from 1835 to 1839 and its courthouse in 1838 to serve the southern part of the state, the town flourished into the 1840s as mail coaches called, public buildings, including churches in 1849 and 1851, establishment of many hotels and coaching houses to service local resident needs and passing trades, persons and commercial travellers. Its 1841 population was 249, with 37 houses completed and 7 more in construction. Research has indicated there were some 13 hotels or grog houses in Berrima at the one time in the early days before the coming of the Southern Railway to the Moss Vale area, which by-passed Berrima.

Berrima had been established 18 years before it had a church in which its residents could worship. A subscription list for erection of a church was opened in May 1841, but it was another four years before the people of Berrima were ready to consult architect Edmund Blacket about the design of Holy Trinity Church.

Blacket found his way to Berrima from Southwark, Surrey, where he was born in 1817. He left England in 1842 to build his own career, stopped over in Sydney on his way to New Zealand, and was eventually appointed Colonial Architect of New South Wales. A self-trained architect, he designed 58 churches, including St Andrew's Cathedral in Sydney. Holy Trinity was built by William Munro for A£900.

The foundation stone for the church was laid by the Anglican Bishop William Broughton on 7 April 1847, and the church was consecrated on 9 June 1849. The church is built of local sandstone quarried nearby.

The church is one of the first designed by Blacket in the simple Victorian Gothic Revival style. His design was modelled on the 15th-century church of St Peter in Biddestone, Wiltshire. A plan of St Peter's appears in Augustus Pugin's "Examples of Gothic Architecture", 1840. Holy Trinity is considerably larger than St Peter's, and Blacket modified the design and added numerous details such as the Perpendicular Gothic elements in the chancel arch, the east and west windows and the open timber hammer beam roof. Stained glass windows are a feature, most over 100 years old. The two on the right-hand side of the entry door are believed to be over 200 years old. Set on a hilltop among pines, Holy Trinity is one of Berrima's landmarks.

The 1851 census showed the number of buildings remained the same, but the population had dropped to 192. During the 1850s Berrima experienced another boom period after the discovery of gold. When the Great Southern Railway bypassed Berrima in 1867, the town again began to decline as Mittagong, Moss Vale and Bowral developed. Berrima remained virtually unchanged for the next 100 years, preserving the town as an almost intact colonial village.

The church hall was built over 100 years ago. The church was rededicated in 1957 by the then Archbishop of Canterbury, Geoffrey Fisher. It has received federal heritage funding of $85,850 for conservation work.

== Description ==
=== Site and grounds ===
The site consists of the church and a later utilitarian timber weatherboard church hall to its north nearer Argyle Street. More than half the site is covered with scrub and maritime pine forest (Pinus pinaster) to the east and south, a significant proportion of this area also slopes steeply towards the Wingecarribee River. The sections of the site that are accessible but that are outside the fence line form part of the parkland surrounds of the site. The neighbouring site to the south has recently been cleared of trees in an attempt to clear the flow of the river.

Within the fenced area, the southern part of the site is a wide expanse with few trees, a level cleared area with sandstone outcrops at the surface throughout. The northern part of the site is dominated by an extensive sandstone outcrop, which incorporates a significant change in level, and a relatively dense cover of mature trees.

Trees in the grounds include some rare and unusual exotic species, such as: Chinese funeral cypress (Cupressus funebris) west of/beside the hall; Monterey pine (Pinus radiata) on the main stone outcrop and many maritime pines (P.pinaster) from California and Southern Europe respectively; Mediterranean/'Irish' strawberry tree (Arbutus unedo) on the left inside the main entry gate towards the church's entry porch; Bhutan cypress (Cupressus torulosa) north of the church; native matt rush (Lomandra sp.) on the rocky outcrop and under the pines; Tasmanian blue gum (Eucalyptus globulus ssp. globulus) west of the church; New Zealand lowland flax (Phormium tenax) on the rocks between gate and porch; Mediterranean cypress (Cupressus sempervirens) near the gate; and Asian arborvitae (Thujopsis dolabrata) north of the hall.

=== Church and hall ===
The Holy Trinity Anglican Church is sited near the midpoint of the cleared area of the site, whilst the church hall is close to the fence at the north western extremity of the site. It is located on a high point at the eastern end of the central market place, in the heart of Berrima. Its site frontage stretches the full width of the market place along Argyle Street and stretches back through thick scrub and a steep slope to the banks of the Wingecarribee River.

The church itself is in the Early English Gothic Revival style used by Edmund Blacket throughout his career, and is typical of his rural churches. It is built of sandstone quarried from the banks of the Wingecarribee River, and features four equal bays running east–west with a northern porch and southern vestry.

The stonework is laid in ashlar coursing with simple hood mouldings to windows and relatively small buttresses to corners along north and south sides. A small gabled porch with boarded doors is located on the north elevation. The west elevation features a single lancet-headed window with stone tracery, stained glass and a small stone belfry with a conical roof at the apex of the gable. The original ceiling may well have been finished in blue with silver stars as it is now. The stained glass windows have been added over the course of time.

== Heritage listing ==
The Holy Trinity Church is the first church individually designed by the state's leading Gothic Revival architect, Edmund Blacket, who would then go on to design over 100 churches, including five cathedrals, throughout Australia. The church is significant because of its social and religious associations with the local community. It is also significant through its associations with both Bishop (later Archbishop) Broughton – Australia's first Anglican archbishop, and Edmund Blacket. It is a good representative example of the smaller Gothic Revival churches Blacket designed for various towns throughout the state and is one of the earliest of these buildings. The siting and relative intactness of the building's early fabric enhance its significance.

Holy Trinity Anglican Church was listed on the New South Wales State Heritage Register on 2 April 1999.

== See also ==
- List of Anglican churches in New South Wales
