= Estelle Asmodelle =

Australian model, activist, scientist (1964–2026)

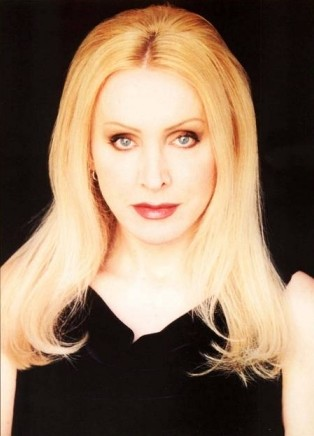
- Modelling Photo taken in Los Angeles 1999, photo taken by Ute Ville.
- Born: 22 April 1964; Bowral, New South Wales, Australia
- Died: 18 April 2026 (aged 61)
- Other name: Estelle Maria Croot
- Education: University of Wollongong University of Central Lancashire University of Queensland
- Spouse: Jasmine Cooper
- Website: relativecosmos.com

Estelle Asmodelle (22 April 1964 – 18 April 2026), formerly known as Estelle Maria Croot, was an Australian polymath and transgender activist. Asmodelle also worked as a model, actress, belly dancer, musician, abstract artist, and physicist.

Asmodelle was the first Australian trans person to receive a passport with a revised gender marker. In 1986, she was referred to as "Australia’s First Sex-Change Pin-up Girl". On 13 October 1987, Asmodelle became the first legal transgender person in Australia to be recognised by the Births, Deaths and Marriages Department of New South Wales.

== Early life ==
Estelle Asmodelle was the first-born child of Silvia and Barry Croot. Her father's side of the family was Latvian and her mother's side was English. Asmodelle has one sibling. Asmodelle grew up in Berrima, New South Wales. She attended St Paul's Primary School in Moss Vale and Chevalier College.

After briefly working in Sydney, Asmodelle moved to Wollongong to attend the University of Wollongong, where she pursued degrees in theoretical physics and computing science, hoping to become a research scientist. She also participated in music ensembles, composing and performing experimental avant-garde music. At university, she experienced transphobic discrimination from members of the academic staff. As a result, Asmodelle left the university to focus on art and music.

== Activism ==
While touring in Singapore, Asmodelle was detained and placed under house arrest due to her passport designating her as male. This and other travel-related challenges led her to advocate for legal reforms in Australia. At the time, the Department of Foreign Affairs and Trade did not issue female passports to trans women.

Asmodelle persistently petitioned the Attorney-General's office. In 1987, she was invited by the Attorney General of New South Wales to be the first trans person to have her birth certificate amended, making her the first legally recognized trans woman in Australia. Months later, her passport sex designation was also amended. The following year, she lobbied for changes to anti-discrimination laws and for state hospital ethics boards to permit research into pregnancy for trans women.

Throughout her life, Asmodelle continued to advocate for the trans community and spoke out against anti-transgender hate groups.

== Creative work ==
After leaving Wollongong University, Asmodelle worked as an assistant photographer while taking dance classes at the Sydney Dance Company and with a private instructor. Asmodelle performed in large female revue shows across Australia, Malaysia, Thailand, Taiwan, and Japan. During this time, she also worked part-time as a photographic model. She later ended her touring career and returned to Australia to perform as a solo belly dancer.

Asmodelle worked as a photographic model in Japan from 1988 to 1992. During this time, she had a small role in the 1989 film 24 Hour Playboy (Ai to Heisei no Iro - Otoko). After leaving Japan, she appeared in several Australian films, including the belly dancing documentary The Enchanted Dance.

In 1986, she became known as "Australia's First Transsexual Pin-up" by appearing nude in Australian Playgirl. It was the first time a trans woman had appeared nude in a mainstream magazine in Australia.

Asmodelle created abstract art from childhood and began working on large canvases while studying at Wollongong University. Her art has been displayed in Tokyo, Los Angeles, and throughout Australia. In 2010, she published her first art book, Transience.

Asmodelle's work has been featured in numerous publications. She won several art awards.

Asmodelle wrote screenplays and two books. Anaesthetic Dream is an autobiography about her gender transition and struggle to be recognised as the first legal transgender person in Australia.

From 2005, Asmodelle composed electronic music. She released seven albums and records under the name Asmodelle.

== Professional and academic work ==
Asmodelle worked as a technical consultant in Japan and Australia. She developed several technological patents. Asmodelle's designs have been cited in the engineering field.

In 1998, she founded the internet company Ellenet Pty. Limited. In 2016, Ellenet Pty. Limited was sold to Sandgate Solutions.

In 2008, she returned to academia, studying astronomy at the University of Central Lancashire.

== Academia ==
Asmodelle's areas of research interest were special and general relativity and its relationship to cosmology and time, and astronomy in general and theoretical physics. She published multiple papers in scientific journals, including the Journal of the Institute of Science and Technology and the Asian Journal of Physics. She contributed six articles on physics and space to Cosmos magazine in 2010 and 2011. Several authors have cited her works.

In May 2013, Asmodelle was featured in the Express Advocate for an introductory cosmology course she conducted at Central Coast Community College.

In January 2018, Asmodelle started a PhD, on a full scholarship, at the Centre for Quantum Computation & Communication Technology, School of Mathematics and Physics, University of Queensland, working in the field of quantum mechanics and relativity. Afterwards the results of her PhD were published in Nature.

== Death ==
Asmodelle died on 18 April 2026 from an undisclosed medical condition. Her family announced her death four days later on her personal Facebook page.
