= Magistrate's House =

- Location within New South Wales Location within Australia
- 34.4912°S 150.3344°E
- Location: 5–7 Market Place, Berrima, Wingecarribee Shire, New South Wales, Australia

Site notes
- Owner: Duncombe Holdings Pty Ltd & A Ogg

New South Wales Heritage Register
- Official name: Magistrate's House
- Type: state heritage (built)
- Designated: 2 April 1999
- Reference no.: 98
- Type: Other – Government & Administration
- Category: Government and Administration

Magistrate's House is a heritage-listed residence at 5–7 Market Place, Berrima, Wingecarribee Shire, New South Wales, Australia. It is also known as Carthona and Ballynahinch. It was added to the New South Wales State Heritage Register on 2 April 1999.

== History ==
It was built for merchant and auctioneer James Jerome Higgins and his wife Mary, with conflicting sources providing various construction dates ranging from the early 1830s to early 1840s. Higgins remained in the property until 1850. It was thereafter leased to police magistrates. Mary Stone used it as a school c. 1900, after which it became derelict until 1927. From 1927 it was owned by prominent local family the Browns for several decades, who undertook extensive renovations.

== Description ==
Magistrate's House is an early Berrima modified Georgian house with cedar doors, floors of solid jarrah and a stone flagged front verandah. Single storied and built of ashlar and sandstone, the house has a half-gabled corrugated steel clad roof (with louvred ventilators) and wide, raftered eaves. The hipped front verandah roof is of similar "raftered" character (Both roofs may be later alterations). The 4 chimneys are stone with simple, flat neck moulds. Windows to the west elevation have louvred shutters. The tall Oak and Poplar trees, as well as the hedge, provide a distinctive setting.

== Significance ==
Ballynahinch is significant through its associations as the residence of the magistrates and the role of Berrima as a legal/administrative centre. Its setting and roofline are features which contribute to the streetscape qualities of the Marketplace and the building has some aesthetic significance as an early building with good stonework. The extent of the original fabric remaining in relation to the later alterations needs to be determined however.

== Heritage listing ==
Magistrate's House was listed on the New South Wales State Heritage Register on 2 April 1999.
