= Victoria Inn =

- Location within New South Wales Location within Australia
- 34.4891°S 150.3333°E
- Location: 20–22 Jellore Street, Berrima, Wingecarribee Shire, New South Wales, Australia

New South Wales Heritage Register
- Official name: Victoria Inn; Queen Victoria Inn
- Type: state heritage (built)
- Designated: 2 April 1999
- Reference no.: 94
- Type: Inn/Tavern
- Category: Commercial

Victoria Inn is a heritage-listed former hotel and restaurant at 20–22 Jellore Street, Berrima, Wingecarribee Shire, New South Wales, Australia. It is also known as Queen Victoria Inn and Allington. It was added to the New South Wales State Heritage Register on 2 April 1999.

== History ==
The inn was built by Joseph Levy, an ex-convict turned prominent businessman, and was first licensed in 1840, operating as both an inn and brewery. Philip Solomon was the initial licensee. There is evidence in an early painting that the building once had a verandah.

It was sold early in 1863, and no record of it operating as an inn in its original incarnation appears thereafter. An 1868 report refers to it in the past-tense, but notes that its stables were still in use by Cobb and Co.

It later became a residence known as Allington and became the surgery of Dr. George Lambert in 1876.

It operated as "Arlington House" or "Arlington Inn" for a period c. 1960s, but had resumed its original name by the late 1970s.

The stables and boarding house were later refurbished as a restaurant, operating as the Victoria Inn Restaurant. It hosted Governor-General of Australia Zelman Cowen in 1986. It is no longer in operation.

== Description ==
The former Victoria Inn is a one and a half storey Colonial Georgian sandstock brick cottage with sandstone quoins, lintels and sills. Symmetrical front facade has central panelled door with 4 pane fanlight. Windows are 2 x 6 pane double hung sashes. The roof is hipped and has wide boxed eaves. It has lath and plaster ceilings internally with cedar staircase and joinery. It has ten rooms with lift ceilings. The exterior is English bond brickwork. The internal doors are six panelled. The 2 attic rooms have dormer windows with decorative bargeboards. One cedar fireplace surround still exists. It has an extensive outbuilding wing at the rear, dating from varying periods.

== Significance ==
The former Victoria Inn is significant through its association with the early settlement of Berrima and its role and as coaching stop on the road south in the early days of the colony. It is aesthetically significant as an early well built Georgian cottage which is relatively intact in form and has considerable early original detail. It further contributes to the historic character of Berrima village as the most important building in the Jellore Street group.

== Heritage listing ==
Victoria Inn was listed on the New South Wales State Heritage Register on 2 April 1999.
