= Berrima Inn =

- Location within New South Wales Location within Australia
- 34.4891°S 150.3326°E
- Location: Jellore Street, Berrima, New South Wales, Australia

New South Wales Heritage Register
- Official name: Berrima Inn; McMahon's Inn;
- Type: state heritage (built)
- Designated: 2 April 1999
- Reference no.: 103
- Type: Inn/Tavern
- Category: Commercial
- Builders: Brian McMahon

Berrima Inn is a heritage-listed residence and former inn, cafe, craft shop and restaurant at Jellore Street, Berrima, New South Wales, Australia. It was built by Brian McMahon. It is also known as McMahon's Inn. It was added to the New South Wales State Heritage Register on 2 April 1999.

== History ==
In 1832, Bryan McMahon (occasionally recorded as Brian McMahon) received one of the first land grants in Berrima, when he was granted title to the property containing both the Coach and Horses Inn and Berrima Inn (also known as McMahon's Inn) sites at the corner of Bryan and Jellore Streets. McMahon had previously been an innkeeper at Sutton Forest. The Berrima Inn was one of the first inns to operate in Berrima, along with the Surveyor-General Inn and the Mail Coach Inn.

By 1834 McMahon had erected a purpose built inn of simple face brick with traditional colonial 12 pane windows and hipped roof in traditional Colonial Georgian cottage style. A verandah supported on squared posts faced the street frontage. This inn was issued the first Inn licence in Berrima in 1834 which continued to run until 1848 when it became the residence for Brian McMahon and his family, two years before McMahon died.

Bryan Patrick McMahon (son of Bryan) had inherited Lots 1 & 2 Section 2 and in 1862 sold both lots containing the original Berrima Inn and the stone and brick building to Francis Breen from the Commercial Inn. Governor Bourke executed the inn's land grant in 1862, transferring it to Francis Breen, innkeeper. Breen was already a previous innkeeper having owned Breen's Commercial Hotel in Berrima in 1840 (since renamed the Colonial Inn, the Old Breen's restaurant and currently named "Eschalot" restaurant).

The Berrima Inn remained a private residence from its sale to Breen in 1862 until the 1990s when it became a retail outlet for crafts. Since 1990 it has oscillated between a commercial restaurant/cafe and private residence.

In 2005 it was converted back from the Bantam Cafe to a private residence.

== Description ==
The original inn building and a simple two car garage are the only buildings on this site. The property retains its relationship with Jellore Street and the Wingecarribee River to the north.

The inn is a simple face brick construction built by 1834 as a purpose-built inn. It has traditional colonial 12 pane windows and a hipped roof in Colonial Georgian cottage style. A verandah supported on squared posts faced the street frontage. An extension to mirror the original was later added.

== Heritage listing ==
Berrima Inn was listed on the New South Wales State Heritage Register on 2 April 1999.
