= Challoner Cottage =

- Location within New South Wales Location within Australia
- 34.4559°S 150.4741°E
- Location: 82 Bong Bong Road, Renwick, Wingecarribee Shire, New South Wales, Australia

Site notes
- Owner: Department of Family and Community Services

New South Wales Heritage Register
- Official name: Challoner Cottage, Mittagong Farm Home; Cottage No.12; Old Dormitory Building; Renwick Child Welfare House; Mittagong Training School for Boys; Renwick Farm Home / State Ward Home / Children's Home
- Type: state heritage (built)
- Designated: 28 March 2014
- Reference no.: 1927
- Type: Reformatory/Remand Home
- Category: Education

Challoner Cottage is a heritage-listed former children's home dormitory at 82 Bong Bong Road, Renwick, in the Southern Highlands region of New South Wales, Australia. It is also known as Cottage No. 12 or the Old Dormitory Building. It is a surviving feature of the institution variously known as the Mittagong Training School for Boys and Mittagong (later Renwick) Farm Home, State Ward Home or Children's Home. It was added to the New South Wales State Heritage Register on 28 March 2014.

== History ==
=== Aboriginal land ===
Gundungurra or Gandangarra people lived in the Southern Highlands area, which includes Mittagong, for many thousands of years. People who spoke the Gundungurra language lived in the Blue Mountains, the Southern Highlands and the Goulburn Plains of New South Wales. They lived in small groups of extended family members, who were attached to particular areas of country. After Anglo-European settlers caused displacement of Gundungurra people, they often worked on farms or grazing properties within and adjacent to their traditional land. Gundungurra groups left archaeological evidence of their occupation throughout their traditional lands, including scarred trees where bark was removed for use as a boat or other object, grinding grooves on rocks where axes were ground, and occupation sites which include middens. Well-worn Gundungurra pathways on ridge tops were often the routes used as the first roads by colonists. Possibly this could have been the origin of the Old South Road which borders part of the Renwick site.

=== Colonisation ===
Early European explorers visited the area in the 1810s. The earliest road was the Old South Road to the east of the later township of Mittagong. An inn was established at the property facing the Old South Road by George Cutter and opened as the Kangaroo Inn in 1827, following the initial grant of land c. 1823. When the main road to the south was relocated by Surveyor General Thomas Mitchell in 1830 to its present location through Mittagong and Berrima, the coaching trade declined and the inn was sold to explorer Charles Sturt in 1836 who apparently used it as a residence. Surviving evidence of the inn became part of Renwick Farm Home and the early 19th century buildings became incorporated into Hassall and Jefferis Cottages.

Two nearby early 19th century Crown land grants in the area went to Robert Plumb and one to John Thomas Wilson. On these lands the Southwood Estate was established and came under the ownership of Stephen John Pearson and John Douse Langley. The western half of the Southwood Estate was subdivided in 1886. The balance of the estate including the eastern side (approximately 397 acres) was purchased by the government in 1907 for use as a farm for delinquent boys. This land along with some later purchases became the Mittagong Farm Homes (later Renwick Home). By 1918 Renwick was 427 acres.

==== Institutionalising children ====
In the 19th century there were several large institutions operating as orphanages and reform schools in the colony of NSW. These included the Female Orphan School (1801 - 1850), the Male Orphan School (1818 - 1850), Randwick Asylum for Destitute Children (1852 -1916) and the Protestant Orphan School (1850 - 1886). In the 1870s Judge Winderer headed a Royal Commission on Public Charities and its two reports of 1873 and 1874 advocated a "boarding-out" or fostering system rather than the large orphanages of the day. This boarding-out system was similar in many respects to modern day foster-care. The State Children's Relief Board, which was constituted by Parliament in 1881 to remove children from orphanages and place them in foster care. However some children were considered to need different forms of care because they were crippled, mentally disabled and or suffering from disease. In his second Annual Report, Dr Arthur Renwick, chair of the board, advocated for special cottages to be established for the care of these children. Early in 1885, four Cottage Homes were established: two at Pennant Hills and one each at Picton and Mittagong. Mittagong soon became a popular place to send unwell children, as it provided, "a wholesome country environment essential for building up their health". Some children attended the local school, others only convalesced. Soon there were six cottages around Mittagong.

=== Mittagong Farm Home ===
By 1886, Dr Renwick was advocating the purchase of a farm which would provide milk, fruit and vegetables that the children needed. He also advocated that the cottages should be purpose-built for the children. Thus in 1896, 100 acres of the "Southwood Estate" (on which there stood a commodious cottage) were leased for a five-year period.

In 1900, the first of some "otherwise unmanageable" boys were sent to Mittagong. They were put to work at the "Cottage Farm Home". This name was changed to The Farm Home, Mittagong, in 1902. It was an auxiliary to the Cottage Homes, which were now designated for use by "the crippled and feeble minded". Thus the dual roles of Mittagong homes were established, a role that was to exist until 1976.

On 5 June 1906 in accordance with the provisions of the Neglected Children and Juvenile Offenders Act, 1905 the Farm Home for Boys at Mittagong was proclaimed an Industrial School and a Probationary Training Home for delinquent boys aged 8 to 17. These were boys convicted in the Children's Courts of less serious offences including truanting, being uncontrollable, being neglected and wandering, breaching probation, stealing, and breaking and entering. 81 boys were admitted in the first six months.

Hassel Cottage was opened as a "Probationary Training Home" in 1906, and the ten years that followed saw the building of Haydon, Goodlet, Renwick, Mackellar and De Lauret Cottages. A superintendent's cottage was constructed in 1910 and remained in use until 1966, when it was extended to allow accommodation for boys. Turner Cottage was built on The Lindens Estate in 1915, originally as a cottage for mentally defective girls, then was later used as the Cottage Hospital until the Hospital moved to the Farm Home.

After acquisition of the freehold title in 1906 the Board instigated extensive capital improvements which made the estate a successful working farm. Initial improvements included a silo, steam engine and wood cutting machinery. Large areas were cultivated for vegetables with six acres set aside as a training plot. There was also a piggery, orchard, dairy, stables, coach house and dams. The Farm was worked by the residents and ran self-sufficiently for many years. The most intensive agriculture on the farm was the orchard and associated packing, sorting and jam making facilities. By the 1950s the Farm had a dairy herd of 70 cows, an orchard which supplied the home and other institutions with apples, plums, etc. and a small cannery.

Industrial activities also took place on the Farm - boot making, tailoring and carpentry instructors provided training in industrial trades on the site for residents. Boys also received training during the construction phases on site in building trades such as brick-laying, plumbing and painting. The bricks for the building works were also manufactured on site by the boys.

The boys were in the charge of an attendant and matron (usually a married couple). Boys under 14 (and older boys with a low standard of education) attended lower Mittagong Public School. The older boys, under the supervision of the attendant, worked on the Farm lands adjacent to the Home cultivating fruit and vegetables, dairying and raising poultry. Most boys stayed at Mittagong for short periods. Boys who were responsive to the program at Mittagong were released on probation to a relative, boarded-out or apprenticed out, and those who showed no evidence of reform were sent to the Farm Home for Boys, Gosford.

During the years of World War I, Aboriginal children were admitted to the Farm in response to the Aborigines Protection Amendment Act which was causing the removal of Aboriginal children from their families. Although a Royal Commission in 1920 recommended against placing Aboriginal children in the same homes as white children, residents have confirmed that many of the children at the Farm were Aboriginal.

By 1919, there were 230 children, some going to school and others involved in training programmes, including orcharding, dairying, general farming, tailoring, boot making, carpentry and poultry, and pig farming. During the 1930s, Suttor Cottage was built to house mentally defective boys, and used for this purpose until the closure of the old Mittagong Public School next to Turner Cottage; the boys were then transferred to Turner Cottage, and Turners old school then functioned as a truant school. There was a fairly strong feeling amongst the townspeople of Mittagong to have all the cottages centralised on "Southwood Estate". This led to the buying of "Rotherwood", a property on which the Rotherwood cottage was built. The original house on the property was used as the Hospital Cottage until its closure in 1976.

A large increase in delinquents led to the opening of Challoner Cottage in the early 1940s. In December 1948 eight cottages existed for delinquents, three for state wards and one hospital cottage, with the population fluctuating between 200 and 250 children. Initially the cottages were referred to by number but over time were assigned names. Challoner Cottage was also known as Cottage 12.

From 1947 the Institution was called the Mittagong Training School for Boys. On 23 August 1974 a new cottage for younger boys was opened, enabling a maximum population of 180 boys. The average stay at the institution was four to five months.

The Mittagong Training School for Boys was gradually phased out as a Home for Delinquent Boys. In 1968 Linden was built for girls, Garran in 1969, for girls and Rotherwood in 1969 for boys. In 1964, delinquent numbers increased, this led to the demolishing and rebuilding of DeLauret. Also in that year Linden became the first co-ed cottage. This was such a success that Garran and Rotherwood became co-ed in 1976.

On 30 June 1976 only 33 boys were in residence. In August 1976 the Institution ceased to operate as a Training Centre and the remaining boys were transferred to Ormond House, Thornleigh. Subsequently, Mittagong Training School for Boys was established as a home for dependent children and became part of the newly named centre, Renwick.

In 1976 the Training School for Boys at Mittagong was officially closed and the following cottages ceased to be used: Hassal, Jefferis, Renwick, Mackellar, Goodlet and Heydon, along with the Hospital Cottage. The 200 residents at that time were either discharge or transferred to other centres. The property was renamed Renwick in honour of the first president of the State Children's Relief Board, Sir Arthur Renwick. Challoner and De Lauret cottages were adapted to accommodate male and female State wards. By the 1980s, 160 state wards were accommodated at: Turner, Waverley and Lindon in Mittagong, and Rotherwood, Garran and Suttor on the Southwood Estate and DeLauret and Rowe along Bong Bong Road. Challoner ceased being used for delinquent boys in 1978. Renwick finally closed in 1994.

=== Challoner Cottage ===
The first building at Renwick to be designed by the Government Architect's Office, Challoner Cottage (number 12) was completed in 1941, replacing cottage number 8, which was demolished due to its poor condition. Named after Edward Challoner, the chief clerk of the Child Welfare Department in the 1930s, number 12 cottage was not designed as an intimate cottage like the others on the Farm. More institutional, the building housed dormitories and associated rooms over two storeys on a cruciform plan. Downstairs was the dining room, common room and locker room and upstairs were three dormitories. Challoner Cottage was used as a home for delinquent boys until 1976, and then became a home for disturbed male wards. The Renwick institution was finally closed in 1994.

In February 2013, government development agency Landcom proposed to demolish the cottage to make way for a two-lot subdivision as part of its broader residential development of the former farm home. The Wingecarribee Shire opposed the demolition and recommended that it be heritage listed. Following the building's heritage listing in March 2014, the state government put the use of the property out to tender. Former residents who had survived abuse at the facility claimed that the state government had reneged on a promise to allow them to use the building as a museum and youth centre. The Renwick Association had offered $232,000, the value placed on the site by planning authorities, paid in $10,000 annual instalments. The association noted that the Renwick victims had not sought compensation and viewed the deal as a way of authorities making amends with the victims.

Challoner Cottage has been unoccupied for a number of years and while structurally sound, is in a deteriorated state.

== Description ==
Challoner Cottage is located on Lot 61 DP 1142602, an irregularly shaped block which is different to the original fenced yard around the building. The building is located approximately 26 metres from Bong Bong Road and along its frontage is a dense row of mature Conifers. There is also a row of mature Conifers on the south western corner boundary of the site forming a windbreak to a garden in front of the building.

Challoner Cottage is a two-storey solid brick building on a cruciform plan with a multi hipped and tiled roof with seven brick chimneys. There is an external concrete fire stair on the northern side. The main entry has a concrete porch and is on the southern elevation facing Bong Bong Road, there are other entries from the north and east. The ground floor consisted of kitchen, bathrooms, laundry, locker room and offices and upstairs were dormitories and accommodation for staff.

Early photographs show the eastern side of the yard was once cultivated as a flower garden. Around the flower garden was a circular gravel driveway connecting to Bong Bong Road. No evidence of the garden or circular drive can be seen today, only the straight length of driveway to the road remains. This stretch of driveway is bordered on its western side by a low brick retaining wall which serves to raise the level of the front lawn area. To the north west of the main building is a shelter shed with a concrete slab floor, brick walls and a tiled roof. Inside the shelter shed is an open area which is open along one side and has enclosed rooms at either end. Inside are the remains of timber seats.

Challoner Cottage is located in a group of five cottages from the Mittagong Farm Home that all face Bong Bong Road and are separated from each other by vegetation and short distances. Immediately to the west is Goodlet Cottage and to the east is DeLauret Cottage. To the north of the House site are the Farm silos and some remaining sheds which housed the dairy, laundry and truck shed.

It has been assessed as being in poor condition. At the time of heritage listing, the windows were boarded up and the building was unoccupied. The building is said to be structurally sound but run down and showing signs of having been vandalised.

While the buildings are generally in poor condition, they have not been subject to significant alteration and are therefore of high historical integrity. The site, including both structures and grounds, still clearly conveys its history as part of a government welfare institution.

== Heritage listing ==
Challoner Cottage, Mittagong Farm Home, dating from 1941, is of state social significance to many of the 30,000 or so children who lived at the Mittagong Farm Home between the 1880s and 1990s, one of the longest-running children's home in NSW. Many former child residents, including some of the Aboriginal stolen generation, have deeply emotional connections to Challoner Cottage because of their good and bad childhood experiences at the farm. Challoner Cottage is of state significance as a representative example of an institutional style of accommodation for children that contrasts with nearby "cottage-style" accommodation. It is representative of 1940s government child welfare philosophy and the architectural design practice of the Government Architect's Branch.

Challoner Cottage is also of state historical significance for being a substantial institutional building built in part by its own children residents. If it is substantiated that it is constructed from materials produced on-site at the Mittagong Farm Home by the children themselves, Challoner Cottage provides physical evidence of the 20th century government policy of encouraging self sufficiency in its child state wards.

Challoner Cottage is of local significance for its associations with the NSW State Children's Relief Board as the first children's home established and longest managed by the board. The size of the building and landscaped setting of Challoner Cottage landscaped also gives it local landmark qualities.

Challoner Cottage, Mittagong Farm Home was listed on the New South Wales State Heritage Register on 28 March 2014 having satisfied the following criteria:

The place is important in demonstrating the course, or pattern, of cultural or natural history in New South Wales.

Challoner Cottage, dating from 1941, is of state historical significance as a key element in the chronological development of a major state-run child welfare institution, Mittagong Farm Home demonstrating a change from cottage-style accommodation to institutional-scale dormitory-style accommodation. It has been estimated that 30,000 children lived at the institution between the mid-1880s and the mid-1990s. Challoner Cottage also has historical significance if it is substantiated that it was constructed in part by the children who would live there as wards of the state. It has been said that bricks, timber and other materials used in the building were produced at the Mittagong Farm Home by the children themselves. Challoner Cottage would then provide physical evidence of the 20th century government policies of encouraging self sufficiency in children wards of the state.

The place has a strong or special association with a person, or group of persons, of importance of cultural or natural history of New South Wales's history.

Challoner Cottage, along with the other surviving cottages from the former Mittagong Farm Home, is of local significance for its association with the NSW State Children's Relief Board. The Mittagong Farm Home was the first children's home and welfare centre established and managed by the board, and it has close historical associations with the first three presidents of the board, Sir Arthur Renwick, Sir Charles Mackellar and Alfred William Green. Challoner Cottage also has some local significance for its historical association with the Government Architect's Branch, which was responsible for its design.

The place is important in demonstrating aesthetic characteristics and/or a high degree of creative or technical achievement in New South Wales.

Challoner Cottage is of local aesthetic significance for its demonstration of a modernist architectural design approach to the accommodation of institutionalised children in the mid twentieth century, in contrast to the older and more "homey" cottage style accommodation used in adjacent buildings at the former Mittagong Farm Home. Because of its size and unusual architectural style, the building and its landscaped setting has landmark qualities.

The place has strong or special association with a particular community or cultural group in New South Wales for social, cultural or spiritual reasons.

Challoner Cottage is of state social significance to many of the former children who resided the Mittagong Farm Home between the 1940s and the 1990s. Evidence of this community attachment for the building can be seen in the level of support for its retention as well as the strength of patronage for the annual reunions and open days held by the Renwick Association. Many former child residents, including some of the Aboriginal stolen generation, have deeply emotional connections to Challoner Cottage because of their childhood experiences at Mittagong Farm Home. This significance may be enhanced if it is proved that the Challoner Cottage building itself was constructed in part from bricks, timber and other materials produced and processed at the Mittagong Farm Home by the children themselves as part of their training in trades.

The place has potential to yield information that will contribute to an understanding of the cultural or natural history of New South Wales.

Challoner Cottage is understood to be of low archaeological potential. No structures are known to have been present on the site prior to the construction of Challoner Cottage in 1941 and both Challoner Cottage and the shelter shed have concrete floors and domestic archaeological deposits would not occur beneath either structure. An Aboriginal archaeological survey of the former Mittagong Farm Home did not discover any traditional Aboriginal relics within the curtilage of Challoner House. There is research potential to enhance our understanding of the place and the experience of children wards of the state that could be obtained through oral history interviews with former residents and staff, and through documentary research using the annual reports of the successive welfare departments which were responsible for the site during its history.

The place possesses uncommon, rare or endangered aspects of the cultural or natural history of New South Wales.

Challoner Cottage is of local significance for its rarity as the only institutional-style building built in the mid-twentieth century at Mittagong Farm Home, and as such provides physical evidence of the change in policy from providing domestic-scale cottage accommodation to larger, dormitory-style accommodation after the introduction of the Child Welfare Act of 1939. It was the only new building constructed at Mittagong Farm Home for accommodating children between 1915 and 1969. A comparative analysis of surviving architecture of children's homes across the state may indicate that Challoner Cottage is rare at a state level.

The place is important in demonstrating the principal characteristics of a class of cultural or natural places/environments in New South Wales.

Challoner Cottage is of state significance as a representative example of purpose-built children's home accommodation from the 1940s which demonstrates an institutional style of accommodation that was less intimate in scale than adjacent "cottage-style" accommodation. It is a representative 1940s expression of government child welfare philosophy and of the architectural design practice of the Government Architect's Branch.
