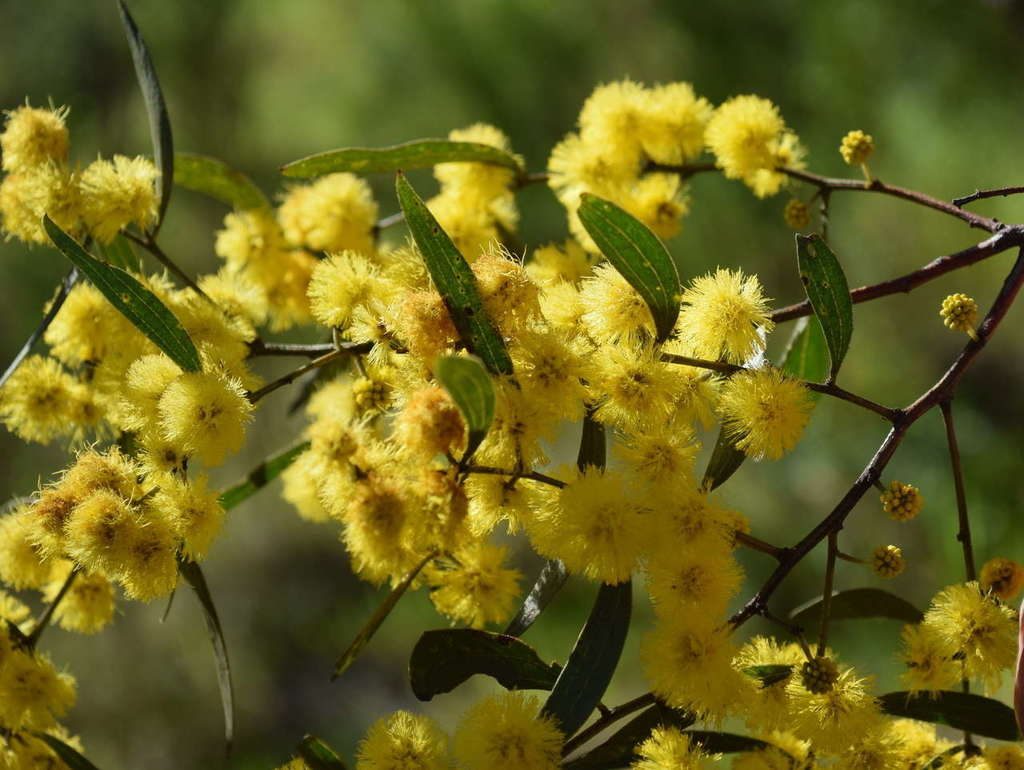
- In the Warby Range, near Wangaratta

Scientific classification
- Kingdom: Plantae
- Clade: Embryophytes
- Clade: Tracheophytes
- Clade: Spermatophytes
- Clade: Angiosperms
- Clade: Eudicots
- Clade: Rosids
- Order: Fabales
- Family: Fabaceae
- Subfamily: Caesalpinioideae
- Clade: Mimosoid clade
- Genus: Acacia
- Species: A. leprosa

Binomial name
- Acacia leprosa Sieber ex DC.
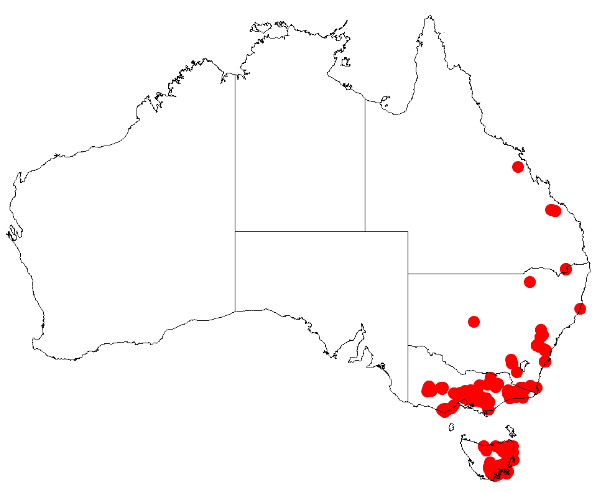
- Occurrence data from AVH

Synonyms
- Racosperma leprosum (Sieber ex DC.) Pedley

= Acacia leprosa =

Cinnamon wattle

Species of legume

Acacia leprosa, also known as cinnamon wattle, is a species of flowering plant in the family Fabaceae and is endemic to eastern Australia. It is an erect or spreading, sticky, aromatic shrub, occasionally a tree, elliptic or narrowly elliptic to lance-shaped phyllodes, usually two spherical heads of pale yellow flowers and thinly leathery to firmly papery pods.

== Description ==
Acacia leprosa is an erect or spreading, sticky, aromatic shrub that typically grows to a height of 1–5 m (3 ft 3 in – 16 ft 5 in), occasionally a tree 8–10 m (26–33 ft), sometimes with more or less pendulous branches and glabrous, straight branchlets. The phyllodes are normally elliptic or narrowly elliptic to lance-shaped, straight to slightly curved, 50–120 mm (2.0–4.7 in) long, 7–30 mm (0.28–1.18 in) wide and thinly textured. The phyllodes have soft hairs pressed against the surface or are glabrous, with one or two main longitudinal veins and a gland up to 8 mm (0.31 in) above the pulvinus. The flowers are borne in two to six spherical heads in racemes 1–2 mm (0.039–0.079 in) long on sometimes hairy peduncles 4–8 mm (0.16–0.31 in) long, each head with 20 to 35 pale yellow flowers. Flowering occurs from August to November, and the pods are thinly leathery to firmly papery, 40–80 mm (1.6–3.1 in) long and 3–5 mm (0.12–0.20 in) wide and glabrous. The seeds are oblong, 3.5–4.0 mm (0.14–0.16 in) long, shiny dark brown to blackish.

== Taxonomy ==
Acacia leprosa was first formally described by de Candolle in his Prodromus Systematis Naturalis Regni Vegetabilis from an unpublished description by Franz Sieber.

In 2009, Bruce Maslin and Daniel Murphy described five varieties of A. leprosa in the journal Muelleria, and the names are accepted by the Australian Plant Census:

- A. leprosa var. crassipoda Maslin & D.J.Murphy has two main longitudinal vein on each side, peduncles 2–4 mm (0.079–0.157 in) long, 1 mm (0.039 in) wide, very densely covered with soft or woolly hairs and a gland up to 1 mm (0.039 in) above the pulvinus, the bract at the base of the peduncle falling early.
- A. leprosa var. graveolens Maslin & D.J.Murphy (formerly known as Acacia verniciflua southern variant) has different characters to the other variants.
- A. leprosa Sieber ex DC. var. leprosa has phyllodes with one main longitudinal vein on each side and phyllodes 3–7 mm (0.12–0.28 in) wide and few, and obscure or superficially absent lateral veins, and a gland up to 1.5 mm (0.059 in) above the pulvinus.
- A. leprosa var. magna Maslin & D.J.Murphy has two main longitudinal vein on each side, peduncles 4–6 mm (0.16–0.24 in) long and subglabrous to sparsely covered with minutely hairs pressed against the surface, with a bract 3–4 mm (0.12–0.16 in) long at the base of the peduncles.
- A. leprosa var. uninervia Maslin & D.J.Murphy, (formerly known as A. leprosa large phyllode variant) has phyllodes with one main longitudinal vein on each side and phyllodes more than 7 mm (0.28 in) wide and few, few to many lateral veins, and a gland 2–8 mm (0.079–0.315 in) above the pulvinus.

The cultivar Acacia leprosa 'Scarlet Blaze' is the only Australian wattle to have red inflorescences (all the rest are yellow or cream-coloured, except for Acacia purpureapetala, which has purple flowers). It was discovered northeast of Melbourne in 1995, and released commercially in 2001. Acacia leprosa is mentioned in The Australasian Sketcher of Saturday 19 June 1880 in part two of an article on the Mallee Country, as one of the "beautiful shrubs" found in the region and identified by Mr Guilfoyle, director of the Melbourne Botanic Gardens.

== Distribution and habitat ==
This species of wattle has a scattered distribution in eastern Australia along the Great Dividing Range from southern Queensland, through New South Wales to the Grampians in Victoria and is also found in Tasmania.

- Var. crassipoda is endemic in Victoria, where it grows in steep mountainous country in forest in the Grampians National Park and about 50 km (31 mi) to the east between the Pyrenees to Avoca.
- Var. graveolens occurs along the Great Dividing Range from Stanthorpe in south eastern Queensland to Mount Werong near Sydney with scattered populations further south and to near Melbourne, and in Tasmania.
- Var. leprosa is widespread, but not common. It grows in woodlad on ridge tops and steep slopes in grey loam or shallow sand from southern Queensland to near Mittagong in New South Wales.
- Var. magna is endemic in Victoria, where it grows in hillsides in tall, wet forest or rainforest near creeks on the Otway Basin at Anglesea and scattered through the Otway Ranges to as far west as the Carlisle River.
- Var. uninervia is usually found in the understorey of damp woodland or forest in Victoria, where it is most common in the ranges to the north and north-east of Melbourne, with scattered occurrences near Ballarat near Rylstone in New South Wales.

== Use in horticulture ==
The species prefers a well-drained sunny or lightly shaded situation. Propagation is by pretreated seeds or cuttings.
