= The Robertson Advocate =

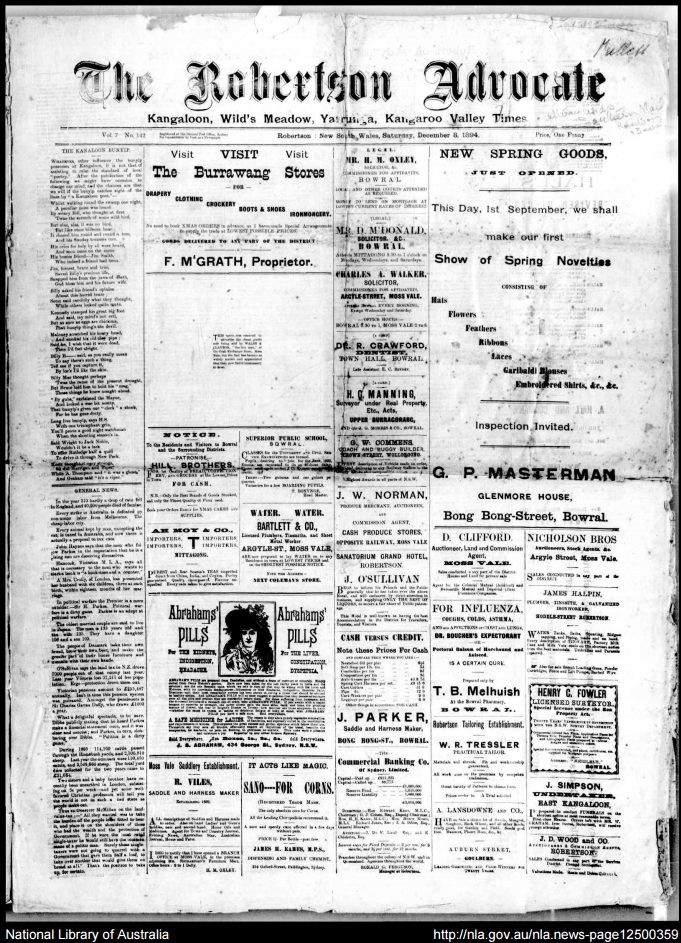
Front page of the Robertson Advocate on 8 December 1894.

The Robertson Advocate was an English language broadsheet newspaper published twice weekly, on Tuesdays and Fridays, in Mittagong, New South Wales, Australia. In 1924 the paper changed its name to The Robertson Mail.

== History ==
The paper is thought to have commenced publication some time before January 1888, and it continued under the same title until 28 December 1923. Beneath the title the banner reads: "Kangaloon, Wild's Meadow, Yarrunga, Kangaroo Valley Times". The last issue of the paper under its original title was Vol. 38 No. 101. The paper was subsequently published under the title of The Robertson Mail from January 1924 until 28 February 1930. At one time at least the Robertson Advocate was "printed and published for the proprietors by JOSEPH WHITE Offices — Mittagong, Bowral, Moss Vale and Robertson".

== Digitisation ==
Both The Robertson Advocate and The Robertson Mail have been digitised as part of the Australian Newspapers Digitisation Program project of the National Library of Australia.
