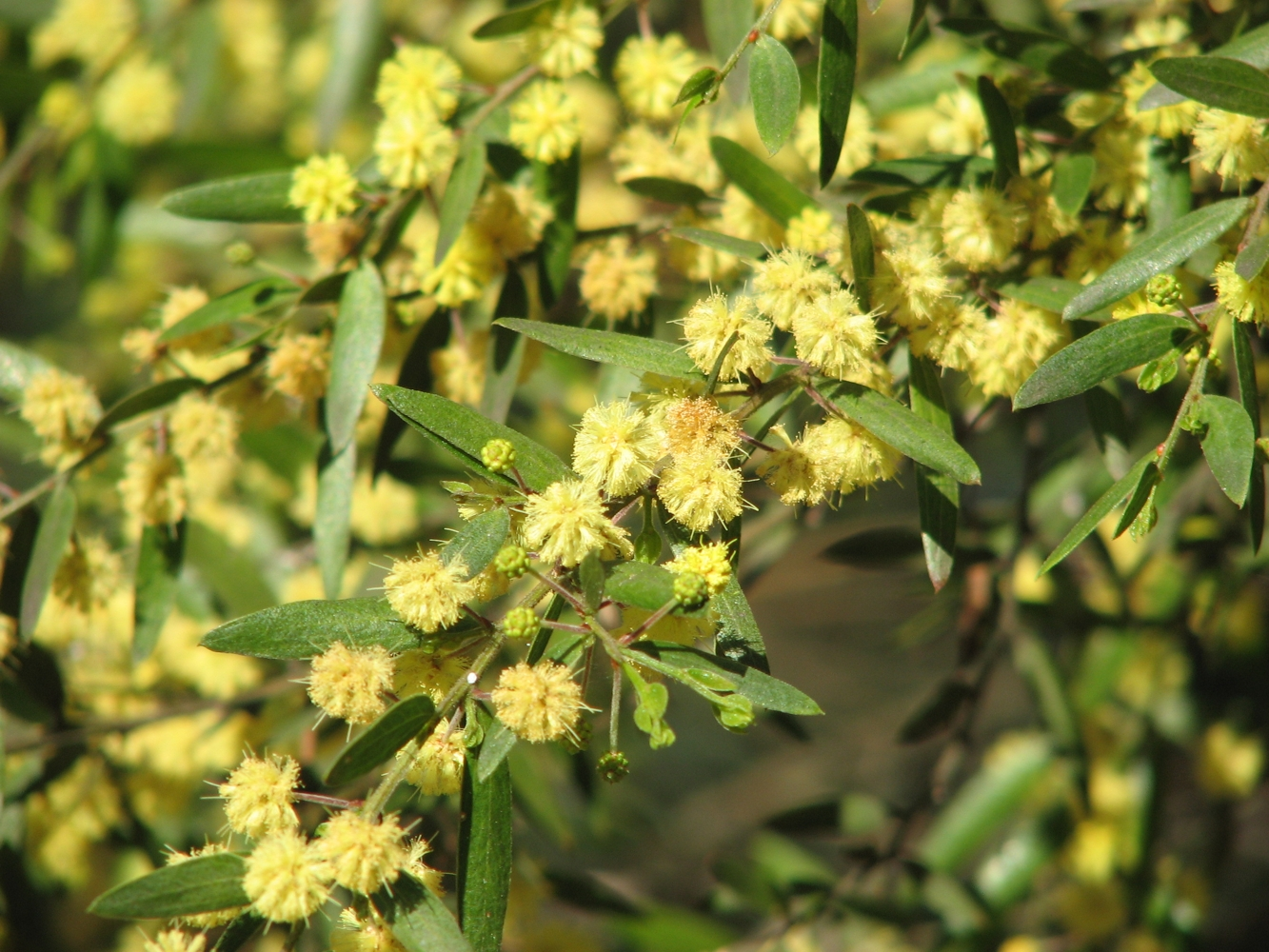
- In Maranoa Gardens

Scientific classification
- Kingdom: Plantae
- Clade: Embryophytes
- Clade: Tracheophytes
- Clade: Spermatophytes
- Clade: Angiosperms
- Clade: Eudicots
- Clade: Rosids
- Order: Fabales
- Family: Fabaceae
- Subfamily: Caesalpinioideae
- Clade: Mimosoid clade
- Genus: Acacia
- Species: A. verniciflua

Binomial name
- Acacia verniciflua A.Cunn.
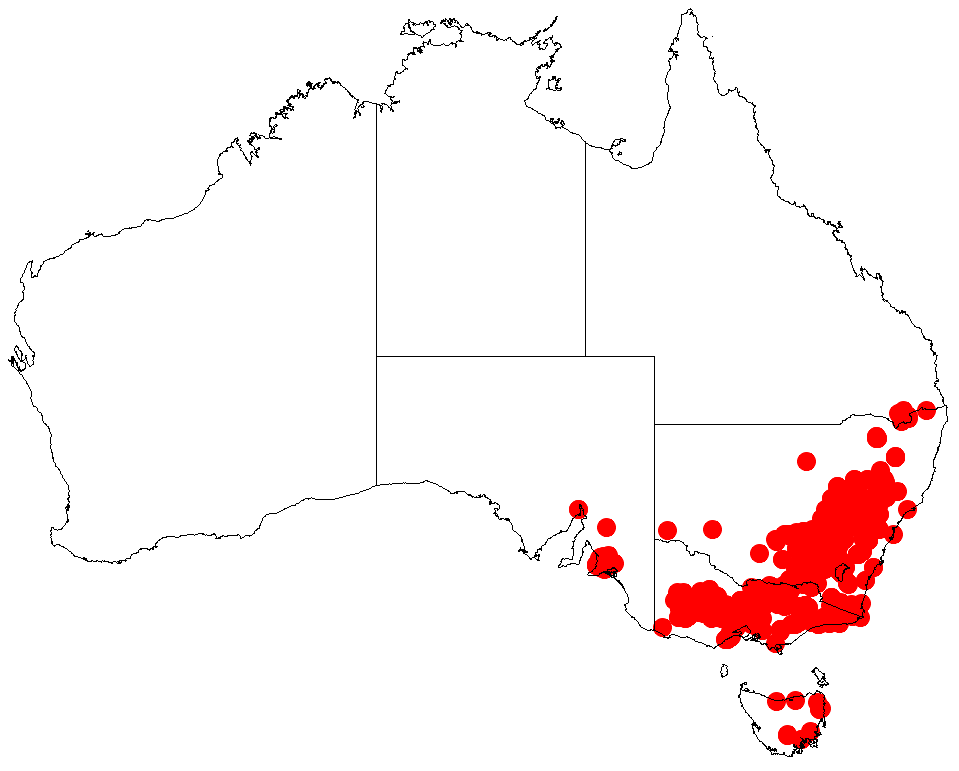
- Occurrence data from AVH

Synonyms
- Acacia exudans Lindl.; Acacia gracilis Dehnh.; Acacia graveolens Lodd., G.Lodd. & W.Lodd.; Acacia leprosa var. binervis F.Muell.; Racosperma vernicifluum (A.Cunn.) Pedley

= Acacia verniciflua =

Species of plant

Acacia verniciflua, commonly known as varnish wattle, is a shrub or small tree species that is endemic to Australia. The species occurs in dry sclerophyll forest in South Australia, Victoria, New South Wales and Queensland. It is often found growing alongside Eucalyptus obliqua where it can dominate the understory.

A. verniciflua has an erect or spreading habit, growing to between 1 and 6 metres high. The phyllodes are often sticky and lustrous and vary in length, width and shape. The globular pale-yellow flowerheads appear in the leaf axils from July to November, followed by seedpods that are up to 10 cm long and unconstricted. They contain shiny black seeds.

Three forms identified in the Flora of Victoria (1996) have since been assigned to other species as follows:

- A. verniciflua (Bacchus Marsh variant) - Acacia rostriformis
- A. verniciflua (Casterton variant) - Acacia exudans
- A. verniciflua (Southern variant) - Acacia leprosa var. graveolens
