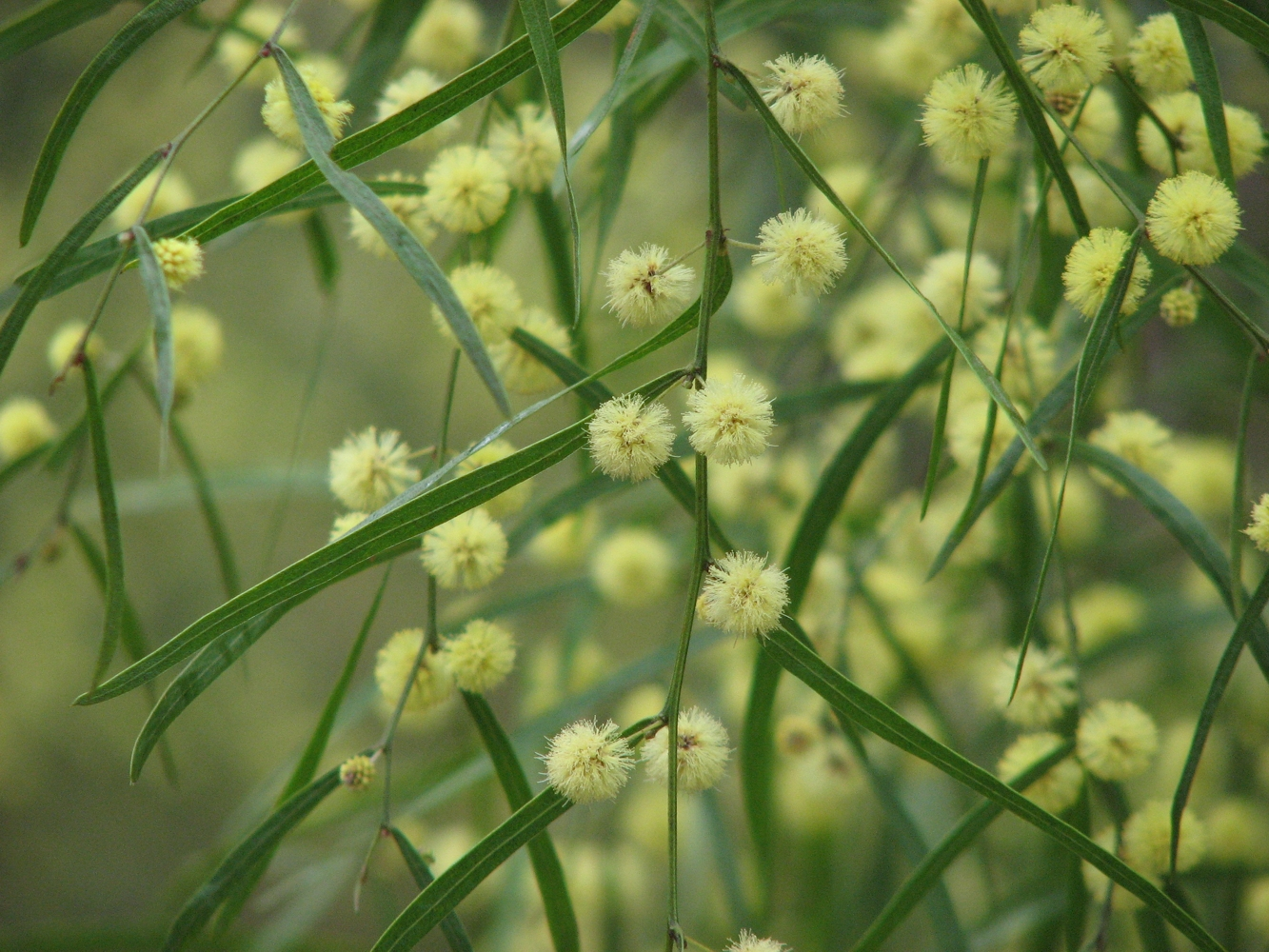
- In the Dandenong Ranges, Victoria

Conservation status
- Endangered (IUCN 3.1)

Scientific classification
- Kingdom: Plantae
- Clade: Embryophytes
- Clade: Tracheophytes
- Clade: Spermatophytes
- Clade: Angiosperms
- Clade: Eudicots
- Clade: Rosids
- Order: Fabales
- Family: Fabaceae
- Subfamily: Caesalpinioideae
- Clade: Mimosoid clade
- Genus: Acacia
- Species: A. stictophylla

Binomial name
- Acacia stictophylla Court ex Maslin & D.J.Murphy
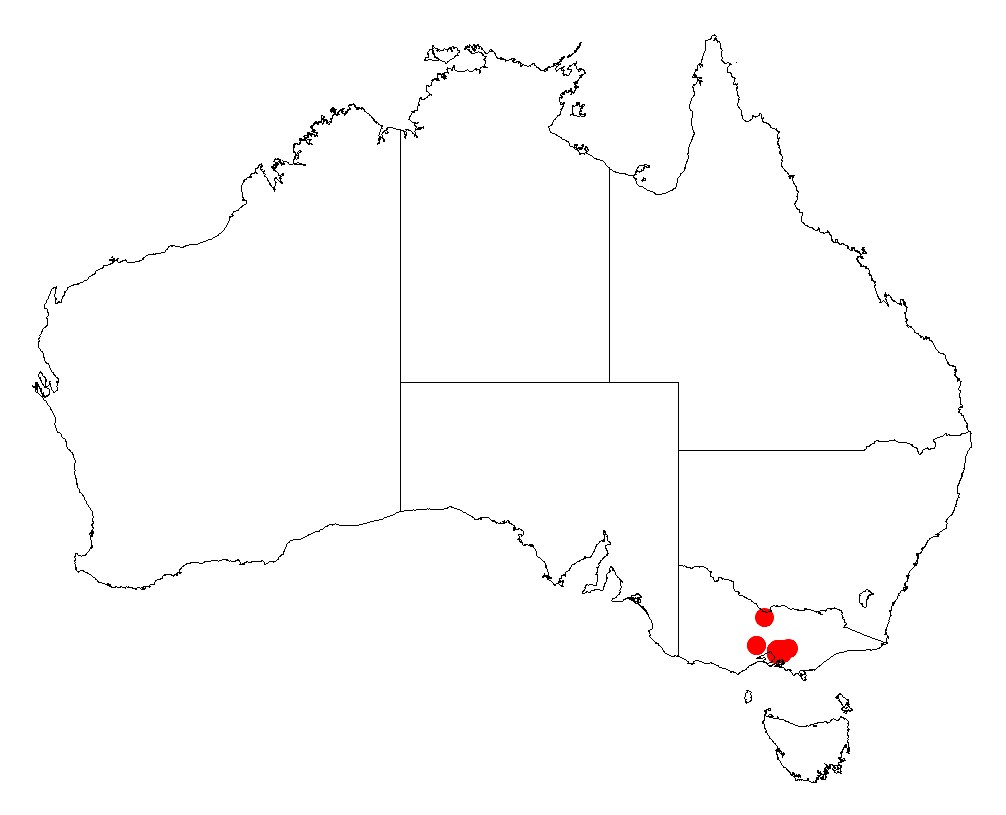
- Occurrence data from AVH

Synonyms
- Acacia leprosa (Dandenong Range variant); Acacia leprosa var. elongata Guilf. nom. inval.; Acacia leprosa var. Reclinata (B.R.Maslin 5868) Vic. Herbarium; Acacia leprosa (second variant)

= Acacia stictophylla =

Species of legume

Acacia stictophylla, also known as Dandenong Range cinnamon wattle, is a species of Acacia that is endemic to Victoria, Australia. The species was first formally described in the botanical journal Muelleria in 2009. Previous to this it was included in the species Acacia leprosa and was often referred to as the "Dandenong Range variant". It is listed as "Rare in Victoria" on the Department of Sustainability and Environment's Advisory List of Rare Or Threatened Plants In Victoria.
