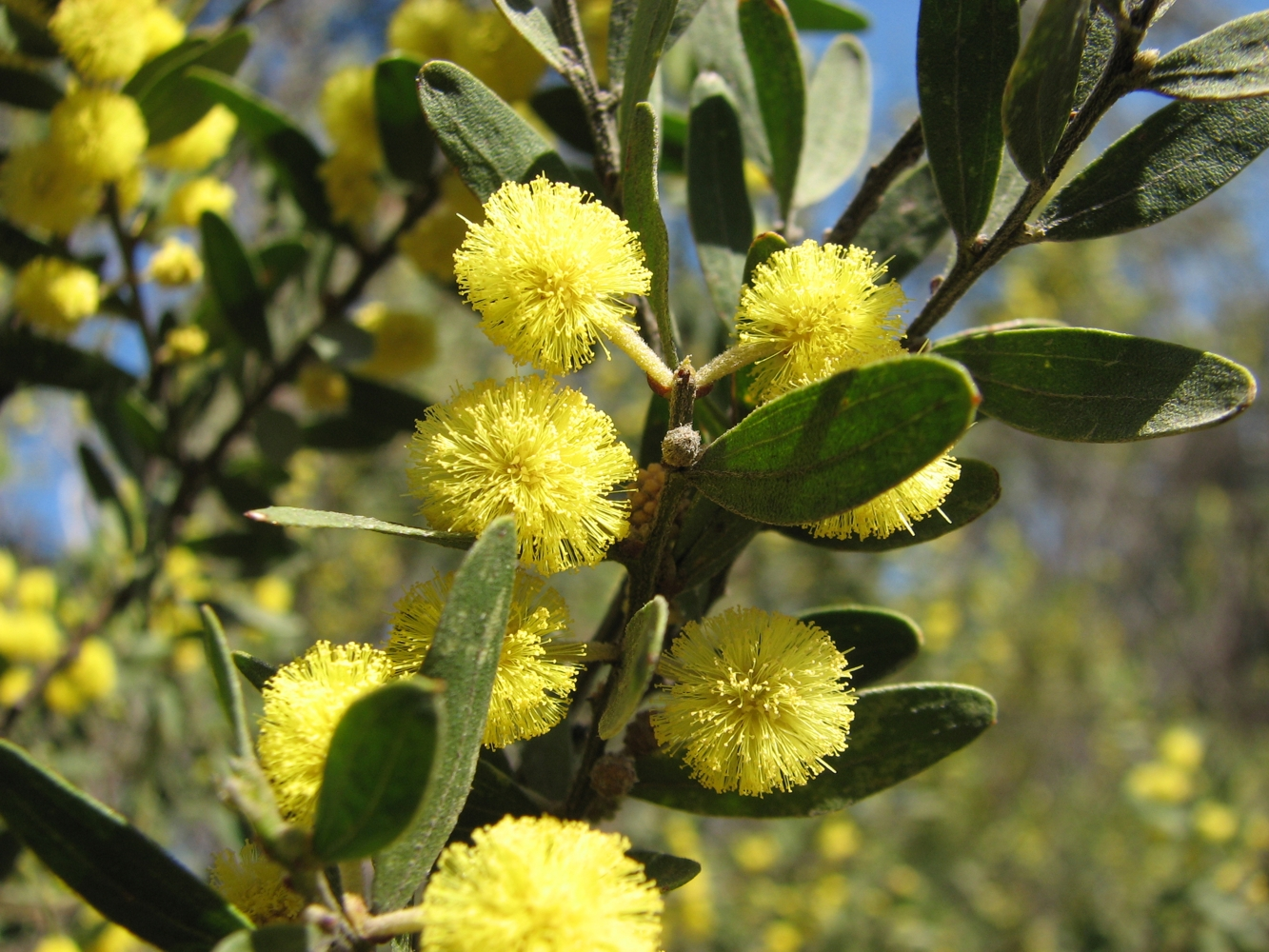
- In Coimadai

Scientific classification
- Kingdom: Plantae
- Clade: Embryophytes
- Clade: Tracheophytes
- Clade: Spermatophytes
- Clade: Angiosperms
- Clade: Eudicots
- Clade: Rosids
- Order: Fabales
- Family: Fabaceae
- Subfamily: Caesalpinioideae
- Clade: Mimosoid clade
- Genus: Acacia
- Species: A. rostriformis

Binomial name
- Acacia rostriformis Maslin & D.J.Murphy
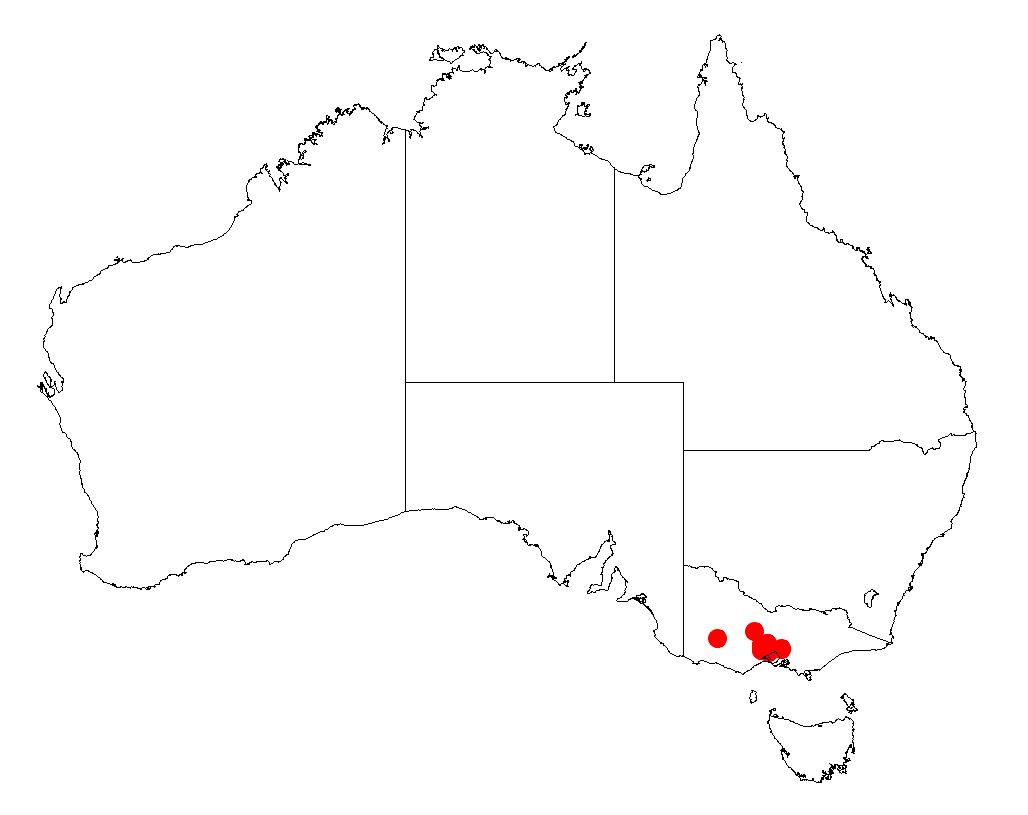
- Occurrence data from AVH

Synonyms
- Acacia verniciflua fourth variant; Acacia verniciflua (Bacchus Marsh variant); Acacia verniciflua var. Bacchus Marsh

= Acacia rostriformis =

Species of legume

Acacia rostriformis, commonly known as Bacchus Marsh wattle, is a plant species that is endemic to Australia. It was first formally described in 2009 in the journal Muelleria.
