= Lower Mittagong, New South Wales =

Coordinates: 34°26′55″S 150°29′05″E

Lower Mittagong is a scattered village in the Southern Highlands of New South Wales, Australia, in Wingecarribee Shire. It is located east of Mittagong and south of Aylmerton. Lower Mittagong was previously known as Chalkers Flat and Nattai.
