= Daniel J. Murphy (botanist) =

Australian botanist

- Education: University of Melbourne
- Known for: Molecular systematics, Acacia research
- Scientific career
- Fields: Botany
- Workplaces: National Herbarium of Victoria
- Thesis: Molecular Phylogeny of Acacia (2001)
- Author abbrev. (botany): D.J.Murphy

Daniel J. Murphy is an Australian botanist.

== Biography ==
Daniel J. Murphy completed his Ph.D. at the school of botany, The University of Melbourne in 2001. Murphy is currently a senior research scientist based at the National Herbarium of Victoria. Murphy's research is molecular based, investigating systematics, taxonomy, classification and biogeography of flowering plants. Murphy's taxa of interest include Acacia, Persoonia, Adansonia, Vachellia farnesiana and grasses.

Murphy is currently an associate editor with the following journals:

- Muelleria (journal)
- Australian Systematic Botany

The National Herbarium of Victoria holds over 200 specimens collected by Murphy and many more as an additional collector. Other herbaria in Australia holding his collections include the University of Melbourne Herbarium, Australian National Herbarium, Western Australian Herbarium, National Herbarium of New South Wales, Tasmanian Herbarium, and the N.C.W. Beadle Herbarium.

== Standard author abbreviation ==
The standard author abbreviation D.J.Murphy is used to indicate this person as the author when citing a botanical name.

== Selected published names ==
- Acacia leprosa var. crassipoda Maslin & D.J.Murphy
- Acacia leprosa var. graveolens Maslin & D.J.Murphy
- Acacia leprosa var. magna Maslin & D.J.Murphy
- Acacia leprosa var. uninervia Maslin & D.J.Murphy
- Acacia rostriformis Maslin & D.J.Murphy
- Acacia stictophylla Court ex Maslin & D.J.Murphy
- Falcataria pullenii (Verdc.) Gill.K.Br., D.J.Murphy & Ladiges
- Falcataria toona (F.M.Bailey) Gill.K.Br., D.J.Murphy & Ladiges
- See also Category:Taxa named by Daniel J. Murphy

and

- International Plant Name Index

== Selected publications ==
=== Books ===
==== Chapters ====
Luckow, M., Miller, J.T., Murphy, D.J. and Livshultz, T. (2003). A phylogenetic analysis of the Mimosoideae (Leguminosae) based on chloroplast DNA sequence data. In B. Klitgaard and A. Bruneau (eds), Advances in Legume Systematics, part 10, pp. 197–220. Royal Botanic Gardens, Kew.

=== Journal articles ===
Murphy, D.J., Udovicic, F. and Ladiges, P.Y. (2000). Phylogenetic analysis of Australian Acacia (Leguminosae: Mimosoideae) using sequence variations of an intron and two intergenic spacers of chloroplast DNA. Australian Systematic Botany 13, 745–754 doi:10.1071/SB99027
