= Renwick, New South Wales =

Renwick New South Wales
- Coordinates: 34°27′05″S 150°28′20″E
- Population: 573 (2016 census)
- Postcode(s): 2575
- Elevation: 631 m (2,070 ft)
- Location: 2 km (1 mi) E of Mittagong; 131 km (81 mi) SW of Sydney CBD
- LGA(s): Wingecarribee Shire
- State electorate(s): Wollondilly
- Federal division(s): Whitlam

Renwick is a locality in the Wingecarribee Shire of New South Wales. It is situated on the outskirts of Mittagong. It had a population of 573 as of the 2016 census.

It was the site of the former Mittagong Farm Home, a major facility for displaced and orphaned children and wards of the state. In conjunction with cottage homes in Mittagong itself, it saw more than 30,000 children accommodated throughout its lifetime.

In 2018, it is the focus of suburban redevelopment by government agency Landcom. The site is to contain "around 600" lots, with a planned village centre to include a community centre, village square and "small retail component".

== Heritage listings ==
Renwick has a number of heritage-listed sites, including:

- 82 Bong Bong Road: Challoner Cottage
