= Old Mittagong Post Office =

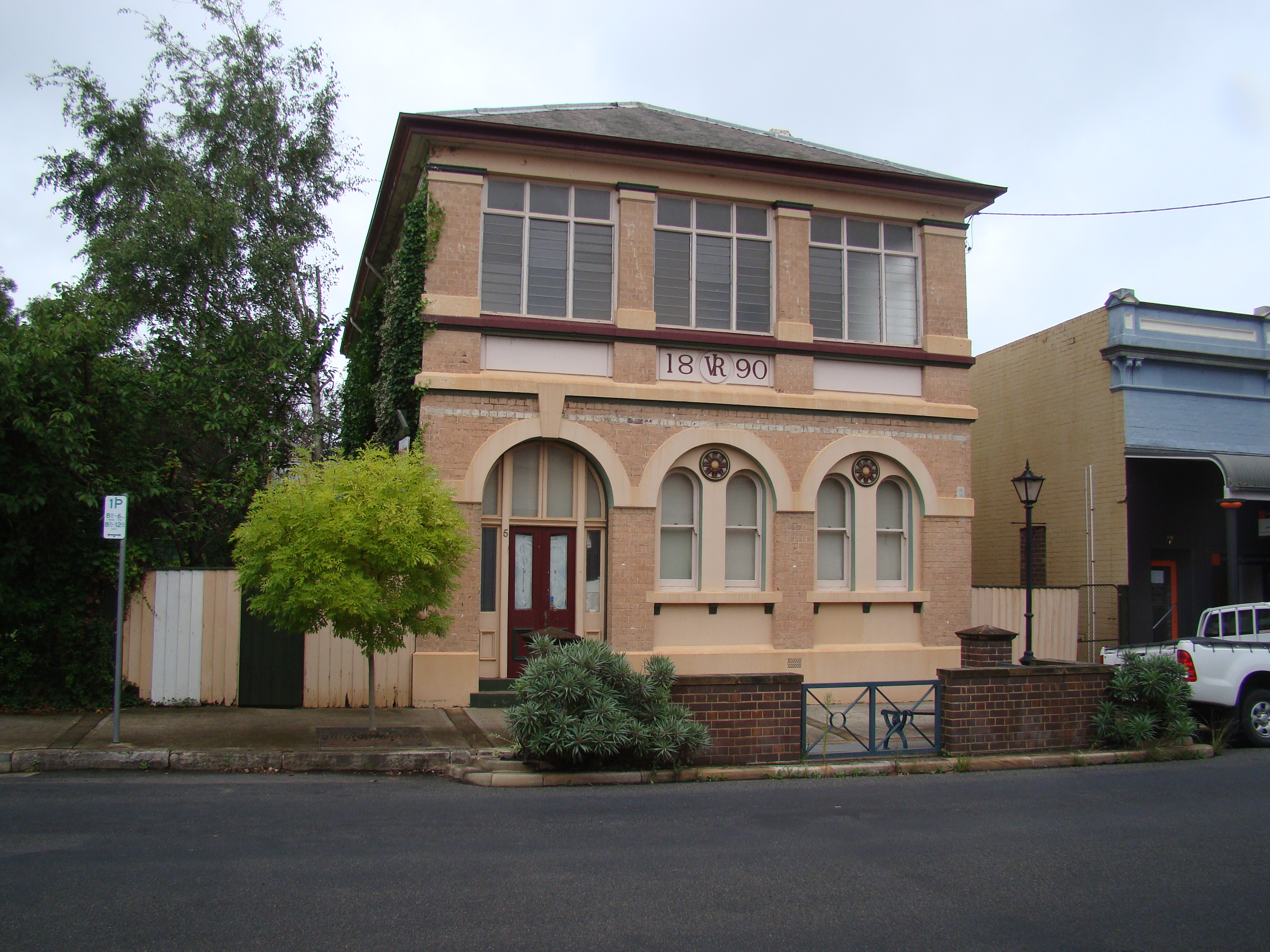
- Interactive map of the Old Mittagong Post Office area

General information
- Location: 5 Station Street, Mittagong, Wingecarribee Shire, New South Wales, Australia
- Coordinates: 34°27′06″S 150°26′52″E
- Completed: 1890

Technical details
- Floor count: 2

Design and construction
- Main contractor: Gatty and Flook
- Location within New South Wales#Location within Australia Old Mittagong Post Office (Australia)

New South Wales Heritage Register
- Official name: Post Office (former); Post Office
- Type: state heritage (built)
- Designated: 2 April 1999
- Reference no.: 00631
- Type: historic site

Old Mittagong Post Office is a heritage-listed former post office at 5 Station Street, Mittagong, Wingecarribee Shire, New South Wales, Australia. It was added to the New South Wales State Heritage Register on 2 April 1999.

== History ==
The old Mittagong Post Office was built in 1890–91. The land was purchased from the Commercial Banking Company of Sydney in 1887, and it was built by Gatty and Flook, who tendered £1393 for construction. The verandah was removed c. 1948, and the balcony was infilled with windows featuring glass louvres some time after 1949. Low cast iron lace work balustrade was also removed. The building was originally all facebrick, which has been painted and paint removed over time. In 1917 a photo shows the eastern wall painted but the front unpainted.

In 1962, planning commenced to replace the old post office with a new building on Hume Highway, for which tenders closed about July 1963. The new post office opened on 4 August 1964, after which the Station Street office closed.

In October 2015, the Wingecarribee council approved a renovation proposal which would turn most of the ground floor into a cafe and the remainder, along with the first floor into accommodation and office space. Two detached two-storey additions on the site were approved at the same time. The ground floor was vacant in February 2018.

== Heritage listing ==
Old Mittagong Post Office was listed on the New South Wales State Heritage Register on 2 April 1999.

== See also ==
- List of post office buildings in New South Wales
