= Hassall and Jefferis Cottages =

Hassall & Jefferis Cottages
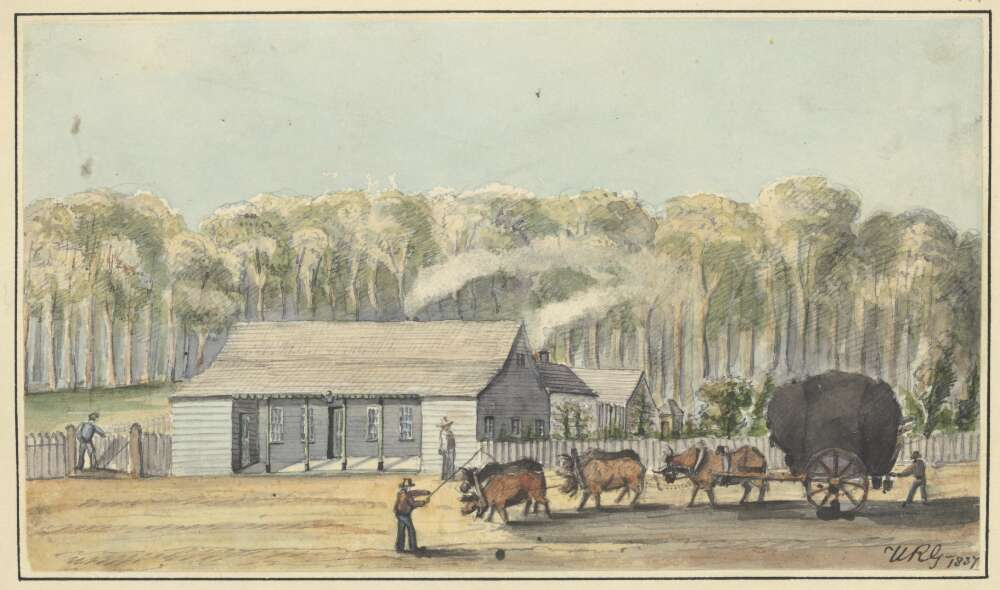
- Cutter's Inn 1828

- Location within New South Wales Location within Australia
- 34.4533°S 150.4853°E
- Location: Old South Road, Mittagong, Wingecarribee Shire, New South Wales, Australia

History
- Built: 1827–1842

New South Wales Heritage Register
- Official name: Hassall & Jefferis Cottages; Cutter's Inn; Kangaroo Inn; Government or Mittagong Farm Home; Child Welfare Home
- Type: state heritage (built)
- Designated: 2 April 1999
- Reference no.: 491
- Type: Other - Residential Buildings (private)
- Category: Residential buildings (private)
- Builders: George Cutter (first inn); William Sherwin

The Hassall and Jefferis Cottages are a heritage-listed former inn, coach staging post and children's home dormitory and now residence at Old South Road, Mittagong, Wingecarribee Shire, New South Wales, Australia. It was built from 1827 to 1842 by George Cutter (first inn) and William Sherwin (coach staging post). It is also known as Cutter's Inn and Cottage No. 8 and Cottage No. 11. It is a surviving feature of the institution variously known as the Mittagong Training School for Boys and Mittagong (later Renwick) Farm Home, State Ward Home or Children's Home, although it predated the facility. It was added to the New South Wales State Heritage Register on 2 April 1999.

== History ==
=== Indigenous history ===
Gundungurra or Gandangarra people lived in the Southern Highlands area, which includes Mittagong, for many thousands of years. People who spoke the Gundungurra language lived in the Blue Mountains, the Southern Highlands and the Goulburn Plains of New South Wales. They lived in small groups of extended family members, who were attached to particular country areas. After Anglo-European settlers caused displacement of Gundungurra people, they often worked on farms or grazing properties within and adjacent to their traditional countries.

Gundungurra groups left archaeological evidence of their occupation throughout their traditional homelands, including scarred trees where bark was removed for use as a boat or other object, grinding grooves on rocks where axes were ground, and occupation sites which include middens. Well-worn Gundungurra pathways on ridge tops were often the routes used as the first roads by colonists. Possibly this could have been the origin of the Old South Road where the Hassall and Jefferis Cottages are located.

=== Land grant history ===
The cottages' site has regional significance as one of the early land grants in the area, to Robert Plume in 1822.

The first inn established at the property was built by George Cutter and opened as the Kangaroo Inn (also known as Cutter's Inn) in 1827, following the initial grant of land in 1822 or 1823. It was a timber structure which fronted the "road to the new country". The Inn catered for coaching services to the south and was the first licensed premises south of Razorback Range.

It was one of the earliest inns and one of the best known inns of its time.

When the main road to the south was relocated by Surveyor General Thomas Mitchell in 1830 to its present location through Mittagong and Berrima, the coaching trade declined and the property was sold to explorer Charles Sturt in 1836 who apparently used the property as a residence. The site is the location of and as the (probable) home of Charles Sturt between 1836 and 1838.

William Sherwin purchased the property in 1839.

=== Mail coach staging post ===
After 1840 the inn became a mail coach staging post and was used by Cobb & Co., until 1867 when the rail head reached Mittagong. The stone carriage or coach house building has the date 1842 incised on the keystone and apparently dates to that year. Paul Davies identifies the coach house as "Jefferis" (1991). An additional brick structure serving as the coach house residence cottage was built against the wall of the coach house after 1842.

Three other early buildings built circa late 1840s - 1850s are identified as "Hassall" including a kitchen or sitting room building; a one-room domed ceiling building adjacent; and another one or two room structure possibly a detached kitchen. All three were built as stand-alone structures or extensions to the inn building ("Hassall") constructed c. 1865-1870. Hassall may have replaced an earlier structure such as the original Cutter's Inn.

=== Welfare and Farm Home accommodation ===
Following 1875 the property was no longer used as an inn and was sold and used as residential accommodation for destitute children, and later a Government Farm for detaining boys.

During the early 20th century many modifications occurred on the site including additions, new buildings and services, etc. The Jefferis structure was depicted in a 1923 government architect's map as Mittagong Farm Homes Cottage No. 8. The Hassall structure was Farm Home Cottage Number 11.

In 1976 the Farm Homes for young people were closed and the buildings were abandoned and vandalised in the 1980s. The buildings were made the subject of a Permanent Conservation Order in 1986.

=== Recent works ===
Because of the major modifications which occurred after 1907, Paul Davies identified 1911 as an appropriate date to which the buildings could be restored (1991, 5.1.6). "The most consistent period of the buildings' development should be retained in preference to conjectural reconstruction of earlier periods".

There were no serviceable timber remnants in the buildings when the property was acquired by the Hagan family in 1989. The Hagans restored the buildings to their 1911 state as per the 1991 Davies Conservation Plan.

In 2001 permission was granted to build a new garage (with date stone indicating construction date) in the style of the 1840s buildings, over the footprint of a twentieth-century building that was demolished because it was unsafe. The 20th-century structure was adjacent to Jefferis and was associated with the Farm Home residential occupancy. Additionally in 2001, a new enclosed yard for farm machinery was approved. The Hassall cottage has been modified and the garden and grounds extensively landscaped in the 1990s.

In 2005, the nearby airstrip operated by Berrima District Aero Club applied to build additional hangars, leading to submissions to the Heritage Council for advice regarding impact to the former Cutter's Inn property. With input from the Heritage Office the Wingecarribee Shire Council approved the application with several conditions, including the exclusion of student flying and other limitations in order to minimise harmful vibration to the heritage buildings and to reduce possibility of destructive impact.

The property was placed on the real estate market in 2016.

== Description ==
The two buildings known as Hassall and Jefferis are located on the Old South Road, Mittagong. They are in a semi-rural location, set back from the road in a group of buildings, with open garden space surrounding them. The Old South Road was once the main road to the south, but now is a minor road.

The cottages' site has regional significance as one of the early (1822) land grants, as the location of one of the earliest and best known inns and as the (probable) home of Charles Sturt between 1836 and 1838.

The present building group has fabric and components dating back to the 1840s together with elements and stylistic detailing from a number of subsequent periods to the mid 20th century, and though a somewhat eclectic pair of structures they provide an explicit account of their functional and social changes as well as an example of traditional building evolution.

=== Site and garden ===
80 acres of sheltered, fertile land. Approximately 7 acres of established garden surrounding the home (former inn) and cottages.

Features in the setting are paddocks with scattered locally-indigenous eucalypts and a backdrop of bushland.

Features of the garden are extensive lawns around the building complex, edges with lines of Lombardy poplars, (Populus nigra 'Italica') and with arrays of clumped plantings of deciduous exotic trees (poplars and Asian/Manchurian pears (Pyrus ussuriensis)) and exotic conifers (Bhutan cypress, Cupressus torulosa), Monterey pines (Pinus radiata). Inner lawns are defined by box hedging and punctuation points (Buxus sempervirens).

=== Jefferis/Stable and Carriage House Structure ===
The former carriage house is a two-storey stone (sawn sandstone and andstock brick) building with verandah on both levels called Jefferis by Paul Davies (1991). According to Davies and Partridge's 1991 assessment report, Jefferis was probably built as a one-storey building without verandahs, containing a small loft, horse stalls, two coach stalls and a tack room. The stone carriage or coach house building has the date 1842 incised on the keystone. A c. 1840s brick cottage is attached to the former carriage house, probably as a residence for a coachman.

The carriage and stable structure contains numerous alterations from various periods, from the late 19th century through the 20th. These alterations illustrate its adaptation early on, for use as a residence. A doorway was cut into the wall connecting the attached 1840s cottage residence to the carriage house, so that now they are viewed as one residential building. Jefferis now presents with dominant gable over the entrance door with symmetrical bay windows, a verandah and French doors. Carriage entrances are infilled and windows have been cut into walls. Kitchen, bathroom and laundry facilities were installed. The floor was tiled, and tongue and groove ceiling linings were added on both levels.

=== Hassall/Cutter's Inn Structure ===
c. 1827 single-storey building with attic dormer windows. Home of sandstone brick with four bedroom suites, living rooms of excellent proportion.

The front section of Hassall may have replaced an earlier structure such as the original Cutter's Inn.

=== Other structures ===
Additionally there are three separate single-storey brick structures of significance including a possible original kitchen building dating to c. 1845 - 1865. Davies suggests they may be constructed from bricks made on site. These three structures relate to and appear as extensions to the brick residence building called "Hassall".

The space between the three earlier structures forms a sort of courtyard at the rear of Hassall. This area had been enclosed with a two-storey infill addition. That structure has now been removed. The owner reported that during works on site a well was discovered in that area and an early brick lined water tank.

There also exist:

- Two meticulously restored, one bedroom cottages.
- Well: The owner reported that during works on site a well was discovered in that area.
- Water Tank: The owner reported that during works on site an early brick lined water tank was discovered.

No sections of the earlier timber structure extant.

=== Modifications and dates ===
- c. 1827 original "Cutters Inn" building
- c. 1842 sandstone cottage/coach house built
- 1842+ coach house cottage built
- 1845-50 Brick loft extended on upper storey of stone coach house.
- late 1840s- 1850s: 3 other "Hassall" buildings built: kitchen/sitting room; one-roomed domed ceiling building adjacent to it and a 1-2 room building (detached kitchen block?)
- c. 1865-70 Inn building "Hassall" built, perhaps replacing the earlier structure, e.g. Cutters Inn of c. 1827
- 1875+ site used as a residence for destitute children - likely modifications made to accommodate this use.
- Later used as a government farm - possible alterations to fit this use.
- early 20th century: many changes: additions, new buildings, services
- 1907 - period of development with major impact on appearance and finish of structures; much of earlier fabric and finish removed. Re-roofing of carriage house structure with dominant gable over the entrance door with symmetrical bay windows on the verandah and the addition of French doors. Infilling of carriage entrances and provision of windows to create dining room. Kitchen, bathroom and laundry installed. Tiling of floor, tongue and groove lining for ceilings both levels. Doorway created connecting attached 1840s cottage to carriage house.
- 1923 Hassall Cottage and garden modified
- 1983 - fire occurred in roof of Jefferis cottage damaging the iron and allowing water to enter, affecting the ceiling linings.
- 1988 - extensive vandalism occurred including all windows broken as well as sashes and frames. Doors removed, smashed or stolen. Staircases destroyed, fireplace surrounds removed, sections of ceilings removed, etc.
- 1989 - Commencement of restoration by new owner. Hassall and Jefferis altered and some 20th-century structures removed.
- 1991- 2000 new landscaping and plantings were undertaken.
- 2000 - Heritage Office noted that works had been undertaken, affecting archaeology and the landscape. The property was restored and the landscape extensively modified. The two-storey infill addition to Hassall (its "courtyard") was removed.
- 2001+
  - new enclosed courtyard for farm machinery.
  - The addition of a hedge to provided residents with some privacy while the buildings remain visible from the road.
- 2005+ Berrima District Aero Club new hangars on nearby airstrip approved with conditions, minimising vibration during construction to minimise adverse impact on Cutters Inn complex.

== Heritage listing ==
The complex of buildings have historic significance as early remaining structures from the original village of Mittagong. The property has links to colonial figures such as Charles Sturt (although no structures from his period of ownership have survived) and significant links to the mail coach industry which used the buildings as a mail coach staging stop and roadside inn. In spite of additions and alterations the buildings dating to the 1840-1860s are rare surviving remnants of a roadside inn and stables, indicative of the form they were in during their working life from that era.

The structures represent a phase in the development of transport, facilities and communication serving the road to the southern area of New South Wales prior to the construction of the railway in the late 1860s. The property's later use as government accommodation for children has social significance illustrating social welfare policy and the property's adaptation to changing circumstances and purposes.

Hassall & Jefferis Cottages was listed on the New South Wales State Heritage Register on 2 April 1999 having satisfied the following criteria.

The place is important in demonstrating the course, or pattern, of cultural or natural history in New South Wales.

Built c. 1842-1865, the buildings demonstrate the early history of the Southern Highlands and the importance of the Old South Road in the development of the south western part of the state. With links to important early figures in the colony such as Charles Sturt, and to important institutions such as Cobb & Co, the site contains importance to the history of transport patterns and mail communication in New South Wales. The site has historic significance linked to its use as a detention farm home for youths.

The place is important in demonstrating aesthetic characteristics and/or a high degree of creative or technical achievement in New South Wales.

The Conservation Management Plan by Paul Davies states that the site and buildings and rural backdrop are important visually in the valley, and would for most of their life have been clearly seen from the road with a prominent entrance, particularly in the coaching days where prominence was important. Good public visibility of the buildings from the street is considered essential to correct interpretation of the site.

The place has a strong or special association with a particular community or cultural group in New South Wales for social, cultural or spiritual reasons.

The buildings and site are of social significance in the development of the Mittagong area, as possibly the only surviving commercial complex from the early period of the original settlement before the re-routing of the main road and before the rail extension in 1867. The property's use as a children's home has social significance to the surrounding community, who were impacted, and the children who came through that system.

The place possesses uncommon, rare or endangered aspects of the cultural or natural history of New South Wales.

Rare surviving roadside coach stop and inn.

The place is important in demonstrating the principal characteristics of a class of cultural or natural places/environments in New South Wales.

Representative of roadside stage coach buildings including carriagehouse, stables and loft, and other kitchen and accommodation extensions roughly in the form seen during their working life in the 1840s-1860s despite additions and alterations. Also represents the first property developed for the detention of children in the southern highlands area, illustrating a method of detainment that is no longer used but which was revolutionary when introduced around the turn of the century.
