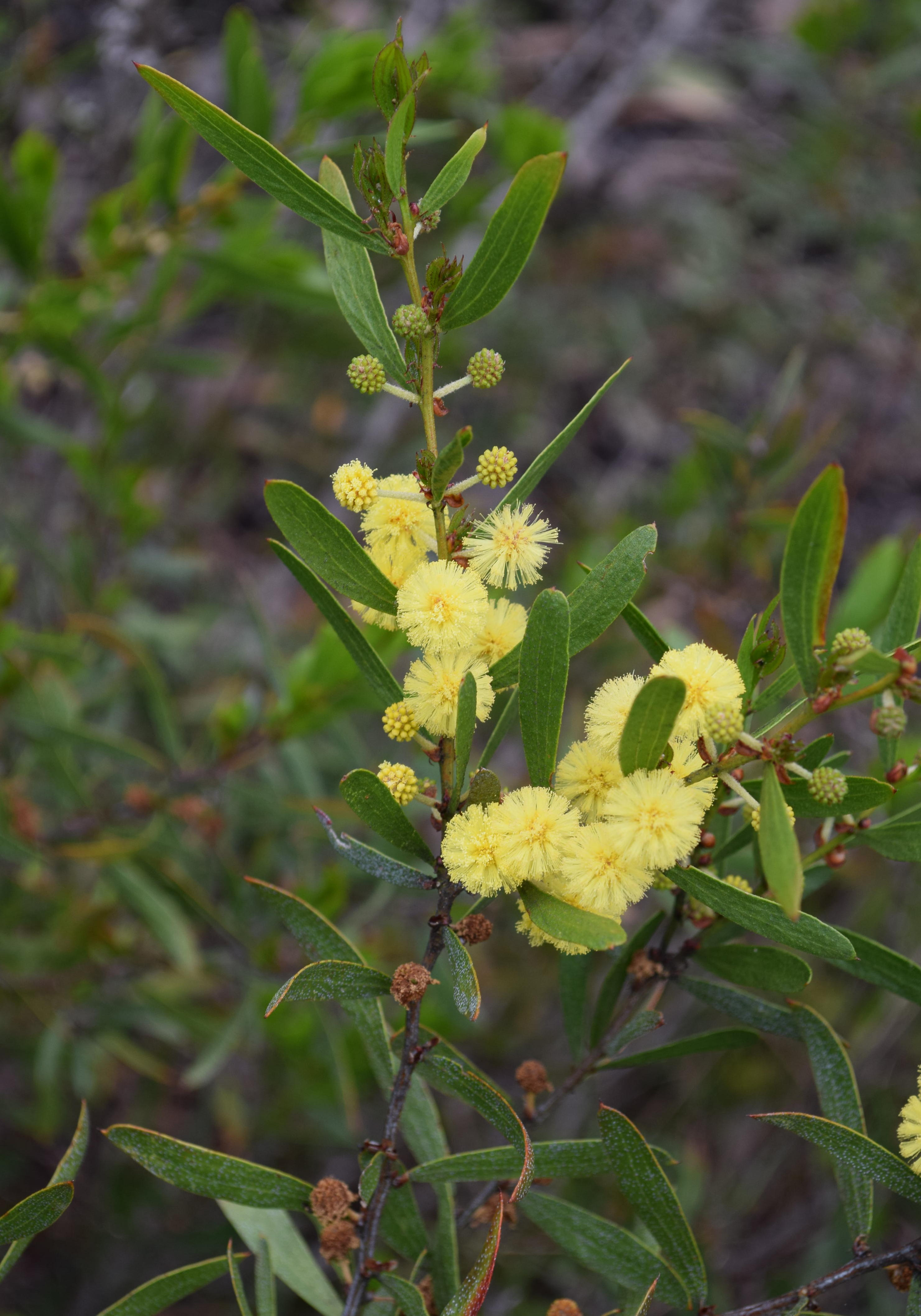

Scientific classification
- Kingdom: Plantae
- Clade: Tracheophytes
- Clade: Angiosperms
- Clade: Eudicots
- Clade: Rosids
- Order: Fabales
- Family: Fabaceae
- Subfamily: Caesalpinioideae
- Clade: Mimosoid clade
- Genus: Acacia
- Species: A. exudans

Binomial name
- Acacia exudans Lindl.
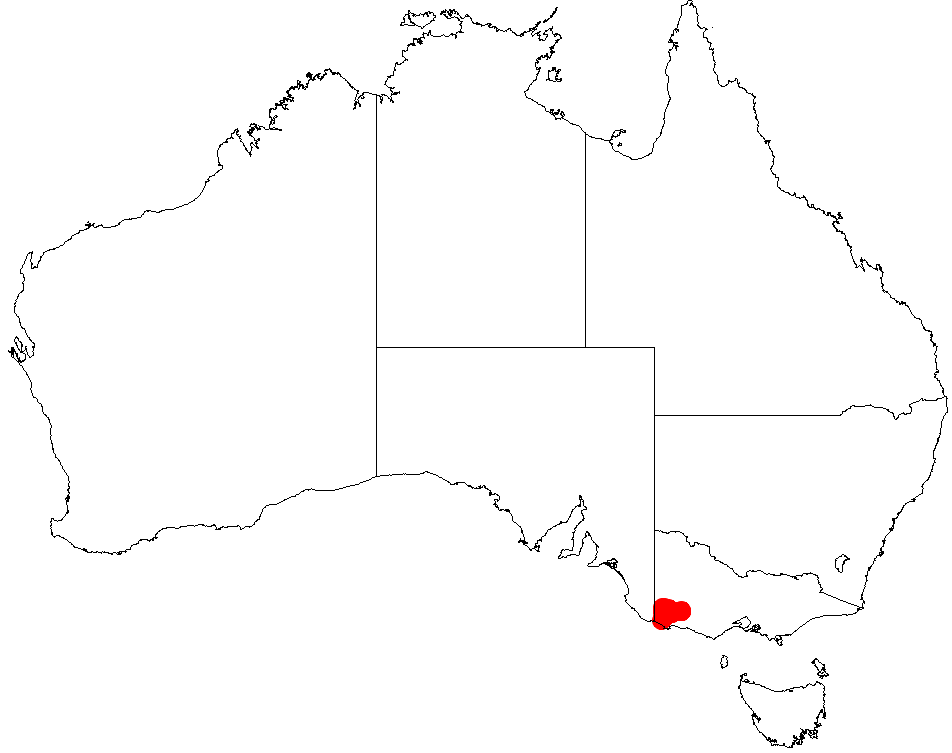
- Occurrence data from AVH

Synonyms
- Acacia exsudans Benth. orth. var.; Acacia verniciflua (Casterton variant); Acacia verniciflua (third variant); Acacia verniciflua var. Casterton (P.S.Short 1316) Vic. Herbarium; Acacia verniciflua var. latifolia Benth.

= Acacia exudans =

Casterton wattle

Species of legume

Acacia exudans, also known as Casterton wattle, is a species of flowering plant in the family Fabaceae and is endemic to western Victoria in Australia. It is a dense, rounded shrub with terete, glabrous branchlets, narrowly oblong to narrowly elliptic or lance-shaped phyllodes, large spherical heads of lemon yellow flowers and thinly leathery to crusty, glabrous pods.

== Description ==
Acacia exudans is a slightly aromatic, dense, rounded shrub that typically grows to a height of 1–4 m (3 ft 3 in – 13 ft 1 in) and has branchlets that are more or less angled at the ends but are soon terete, glabrous and often thickly resinous between rib-like bands of yellow tissue. The phyllodes are borne on persistent, raised stem projections, usually narrowly oblong to narrowly elliptic or lance-shaped with the narrower end towards the base, mostly 300–600 mm (12–24 in) long and 6–17 mm (0.24–0.67 in) wide with two veins on each side. There are usually persistent stipules 2–4 mm (0.079–0.157 in) long and a gland up to 4 mm (0.16 in) above the base of the phyllodes. The flowers are borne in one or two large spherical heads in axils, on stout peduncles 4–10 mm (0.16–0.39 in) long, each head 6–9 mm (0.24–0.35 in) in diameter with 50 to 60 lemon yellow flowers. Flowering occurs in September and October, and the pods are narrowly oblong, 20–70 mm (0.79–2.76 in) long, 5–7 mm (0.20–0.28 in) wide and thinly leathery to crusty and glabrous. The seeds are oblong to circular, 3.8–4.3 mm (0.15–0.17 in) long and dark brown to black with an aril.

== Taxonomy ==
Acacia exudans was formally described in 1838 by English botanist John Lindley in Thomas Mitchell's Three Expeditions into the interior of Eastern Australia.

== Distribution and habitat ==
Casterton wattle grows in low, undulating country in heath or low woodland in areas that have been extensively cleared for agriculture. The species is endemic to south-western Victoria in the small area bounded by Casterton, Hamilton and Dartmoor, where it often grows along degraded road verges.

== Conservation status ==
Acacia exudans is listed as "critically endangered" under the Victorian Government Flora and Fauna Guarantee Act 1988.
