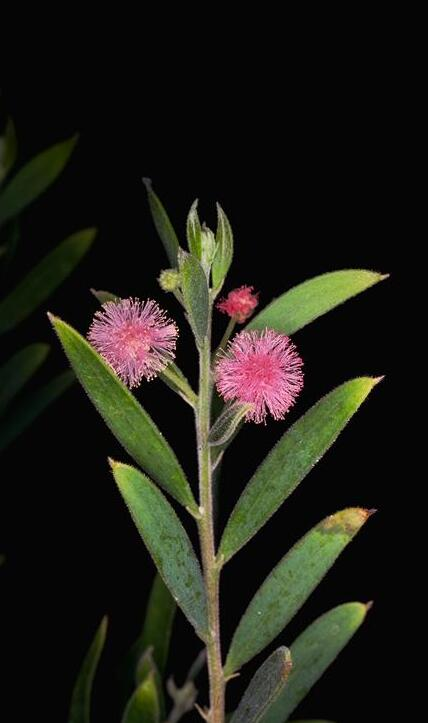
- In the Australian National Botanic Gardens

Conservation status
- Critically endangered (EPBC Act)

Scientific classification
- Kingdom: Plantae
- Clade: Embryophytes
- Clade: Tracheophytes
- Clade: Spermatophytes
- Clade: Angiosperms
- Clade: Eudicots
- Clade: Rosids
- Order: Fabales
- Family: Fabaceae
- Subfamily: Caesalpinioideae
- Clade: Mimosoid clade
- Genus: Acacia
- Species: A. purpureopetala

Binomial name
- Acacia purpureopetala Bailey
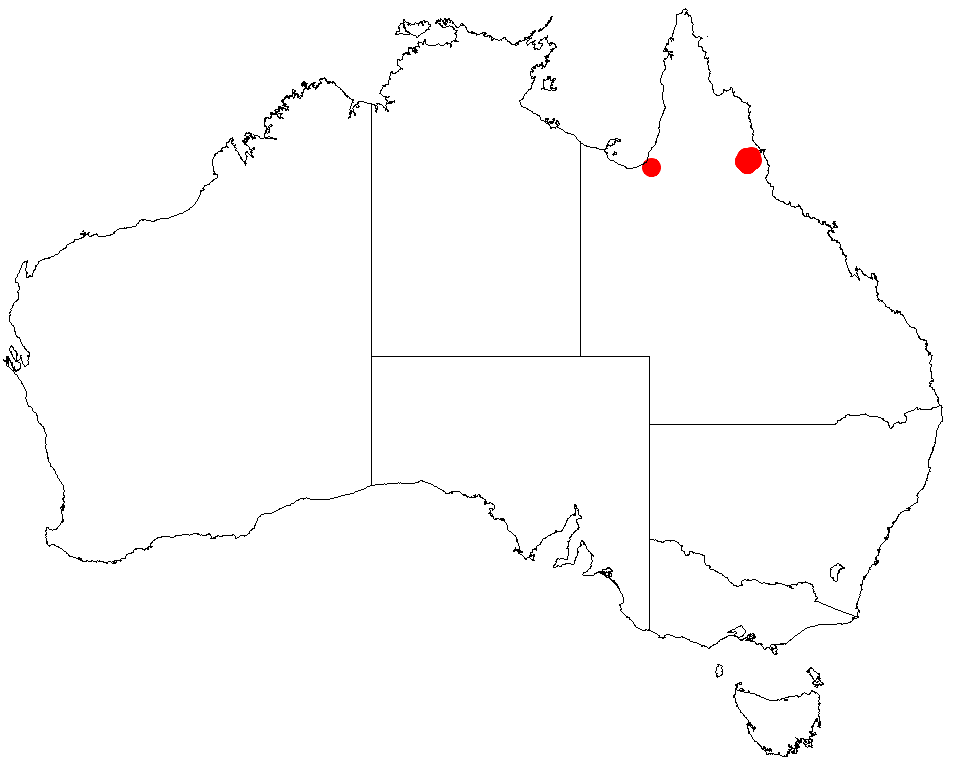
- Occurrence data from AVH

= Acacia purpureopetala =

Purple flowered wattle

Species of legume

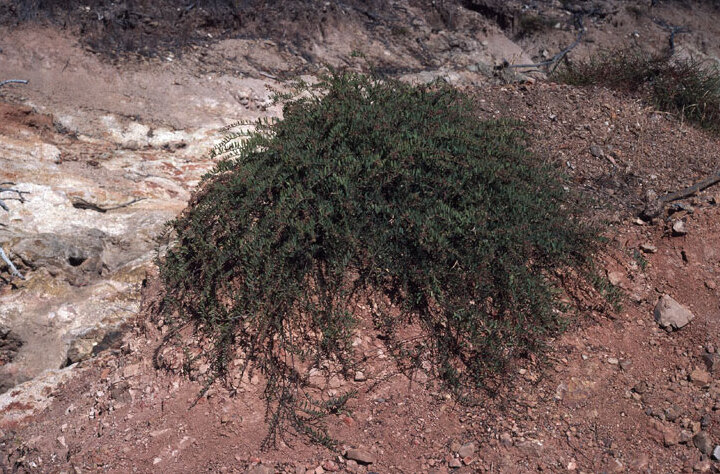
Habit west of Atherton

Acacia purpureopetala, more commonly known as purple flowered wattle or Cupid's wattle, is the only pink flowering wattle in Australia. It grows in the Herberton district of north-east Queensland. It is only known from five discreet locations with approximately 7,000 individual plants remaining.

Community members often refer to the plant as Cupid's wattle, Purple flowered wattle or pink wattle because of the colour of the bloom, which comes around Mother's day every year. It is the only wattle found in Australia with purple flowers.

== Description ==
The small shrub has a spreading habit with prostrate branches. The angular to terete branches are densely covered with white spreading hairs. It flowers between May and September.

== Distribution ==
It is endemic to a small area in north eastern Queensland around Herberton, around Mount Emerald found to the south-west of Walkamin and at Stannary Hills. It is situated on steep rocky slopes, with an altitude of 780 to 880 m (2,560 to 2,890 ft) as a part of Eucalyptus woodland communities.

== Conservation Status ==
Acacia purpureopetala is listed as "critically endangered" under the Australian Environment Protection and Biodiversity Conservation Act 1999. It is listed as "near threatened" under the Queensland Nature Conservation Act 1992.

== See also ==
- List of Acacia species
