= Welby, New South Wales =

Welby
- Town
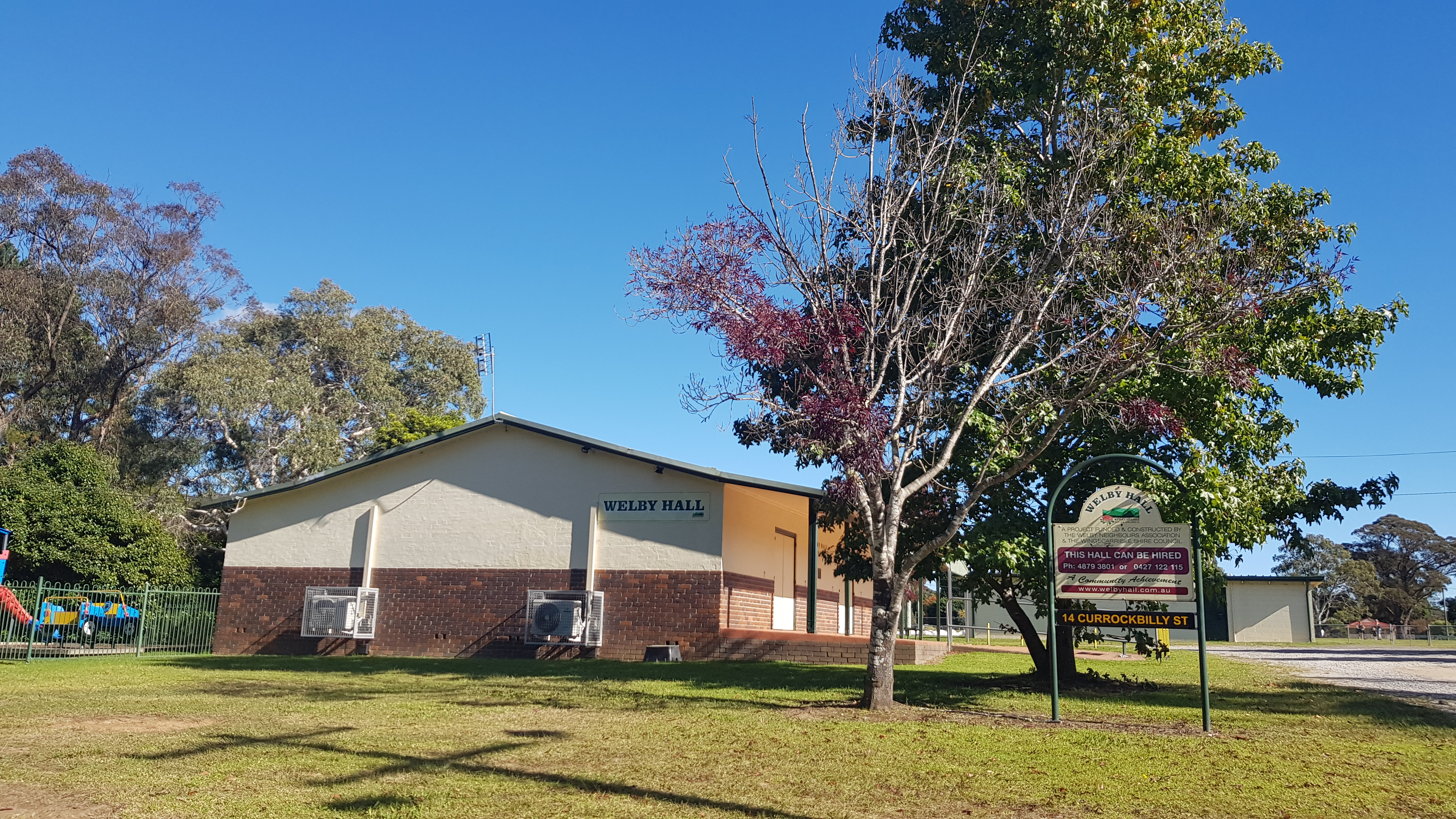
- Welby Hall, 2023

- Coordinates: 34°26′25″S 150°25′35″E
- Country: Australia
- State: New South Wales
- Region: Southern Highlands
- LGA: Wingecarribee Shire
- Location: 122 km (76 mi) from Sydney; 3 km (1.9 mi) from Mittagong

Government
  - State electorate: Wollondilly
  - Federal division: Whitlam
- Elevation: 647 m (2,123 ft)

Population
  - Total: 764 (SAL 2021)
- Postcode: 2575
Localities around Welby
		Colo Vale
	Welby	Mittagong
Berrima	Bowral	Bowral

Welby is a small town in the Southern Highlands of New South Wales, Australia, in Wingecarribee Shire. It was originally called Fitz Roy. The town is located 1 km west of Mittagong and houses the local Welby cemetery.

According to the 2016 census, Welby had a population of 759. At the 2021 census, there were 764 people living at Welby.

A number of properties, built in both triple brick and stone with bull nose verandas, date back to 1850 and The old Fitz Roy Progress Association Hall which was built in 1931 is still standing. It is now an antique shop - The Merchant of Welby.
