= Mittagong =

- Town
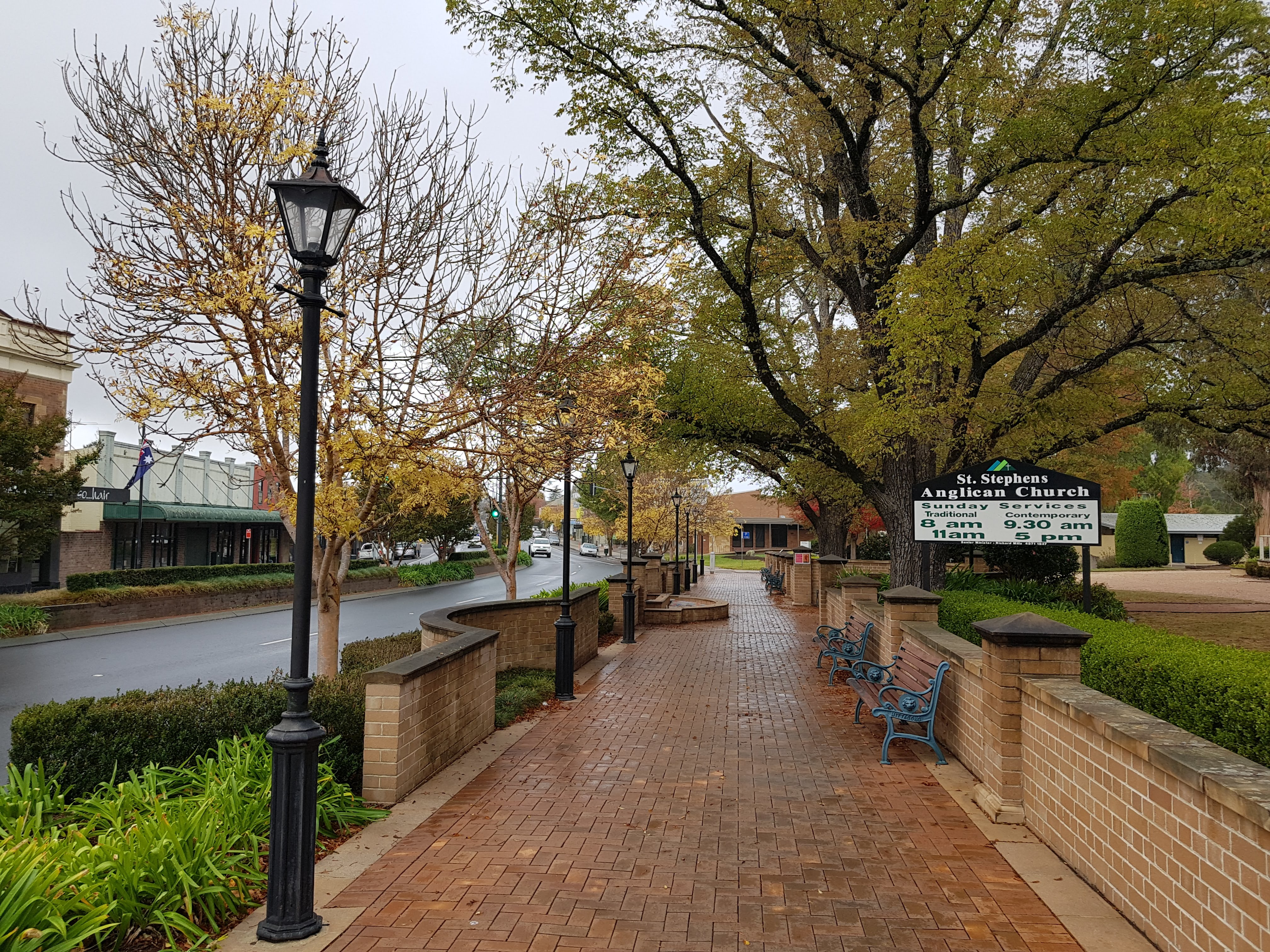
- Mittagong town centre

- Coordinates: 34°27′S 150°27′E
- Country: Australia
- State: New South Wales
- Region: Southern Highlands
- LGA: Wingecarribee
- Location: 125 km (78 mi) from Sydney; 6 km (3.7 mi) from Bowral

Government
  - State electorate: Wollondilly
  - Federal division: Whitlam
- Elevation: 635 m (2,083 ft)

Population
  - Total: 6,090 (SAL 2021)
- Postcode: 2575
- County: Camden
- Parish: Mittagong
- Mean max temp: 18.7 °C (65.7 °F)
- Mean min temp: 7.9 °C (46.2 °F)
- Annual rainfall: 931.7 mm (36.68 in)
Localities around Mittagong
	Colo Vale	Willow Vale
Welby	Mittagong	Renwick
Bowral	Bowral	Glenquarry

Mittagong (/mɪtəɡɒŋ/, mit-ə-GONG) is a town in the Southern Highlands of New South Wales, Australia, in Wingecarribee Shire. The town acts as the gateway to the Southern Highlands when coming from Sydney. Mittagong is situated at an elevation of 635 metres (2,083 ft). The town is close to Bowral, Berrima, Moss Vale and the Northern Villages such as Yerrinbool and Colo Vale. Moreover, Mittagong is home to many wineries of the Southern Highlands which has been a recent growing wine and cellar door region.

== Etymology ==
The name "Mittagong" is said to come from an Aboriginal word meaning "little mountain". Other suggested meanings are "a companion" and "plenty of native dogs", as the Mittagong range was home to many dingos at one time.

== History ==
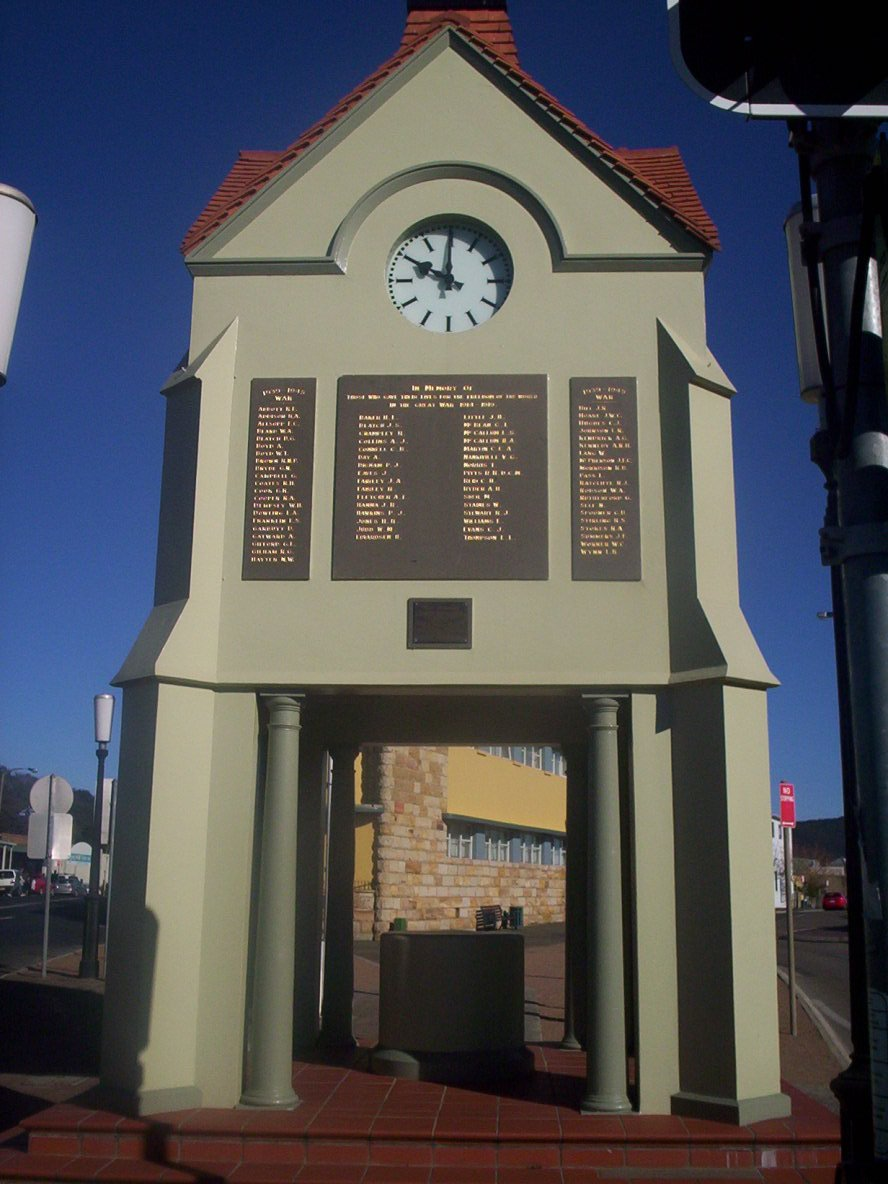
World War I memorial in Mittagong

The first European permanent settler in the Mittagong district was William Chalker (1775–1823) (also known as Charker), a former convict transported from England, who arrived in the area on 10 May 1821. He became the Principal Overseer of Government Stock, Chief Constable and Poundkeeper in the Cowpastures. A memorial plaque to Chalker was unveiled in May 1988 as a Bicentennial project; the plaque overlooks an area once known as Chalker's Flat and later known as Lower Mittagong.

As early as February 1841 an attempt was made to sell land in a subdivision called the "Town of Gainsborough", followed by the "Livingstone Township" subdivision in June 1842, however the sales appeared to have failed and no further attempts to subdivide were attempted for some time until the iron works came into operation. In August 1861 Surveyor Campbell suggested a portion of land be reserved for village purposes. This reserve was made in 1862 and called the "Village of Fitzroy" (now Welby), and in May 1865 a subdivision consisting of 245 blocks was offered for sale in the township of "New Sheffield" an area which substantially coincided with the central portion of the present Mittagong, being subdivided by the Fitzroy Iron Mining Company. The area between the present-day Lyell and Pioneer Streets was called Nattai and was the postal township for many years before the name Mittagong was generally applied with the advent of the railway in 1867. In 1802, Barralier wrote of establishing his camp at a place called "Nattai" by the natives. About 1884 New Sheffield and Nattai united to form the present town of Mittagong.

Mittagong has been home to many industries, with iron being first smelted in the area. The Mittagong Coal Mining Company (Box Vale Colliery), Joadja Kerosene Shale, and the first supply of fresh milk and butter to Sydney by the Fresh Food & Ice Company all operated out of Mittagong in years gone by.

The transport of iron ore and smelted iron was made by steam train. Lake Alexandra was originally a water supply dam for railway engines hauling coal from the back of Mount Alexandra to the iron mines. It was drained in the 1890s when the land around it was given to Council by the Mittagong Land Company.

The presence of the ironstone was discovered when the deviation of the southbound road was being made through Mittagong in the early 1830s. Fifteen years elapsed before any attempt was made to work the iron deposit. In 1848 land was taken up and smelting commenced at the Fitzroy Iron Works in a small blast furnace that had been erected. The Sydney Morning Herald of 12 December 1848 said the public had already witnessed the success of the mine by the specimens of manufactured articles exhibited in Sydney. On 2 February 1849 it was stated that a quarry had been opened and stone prepared for buildings in course of erection. A brickfield had also commenced operations. Smelting was being carried on by means of a Cataline furnace and two shafts had been sunk. The party engaged in operating the mine was living in tents until buildings were erected. The mine was referred to at this time as the Fitz Roy iron mine, doubtless in honour of Sir Charles A. Fitz Roy, the Governor-General.

Associated with the iron ore deposit was the Chalybeate Spring, an iron-rich mineral spring that was a tourist attraction mainly during the second half of the 19th century and first few decades of C20th.

The town was dominated by trucks and in winter inundated with traffic carrying skiers' on their way to the Australian Alps until 1992 when the Hume Highway opened and bypassed Mittagong and all the towns and villages of the Southern Highlands. The highway bypass was first evaluated as having a slightly negative impact on Mittagong's economy for about a year after its opening, due to the loss of traffic-serving business. Expectations were re-evaluated as mildly positive in 1994 taking into account hard-to-quantify benefits such as the increased appeal of the town as a place to live.

Mittagong is also home to a prestigious girls secondary private boarding school, Frensham, which was opened by Winifred Mary West in 1913. The school is notable for its alumni which include Dr Catherine Hamlin and former Lord Mayor of Sydney, Lucy Turnbull.

The Mittagong Farm Homes for Boys, Mittagong TSB (training school boys), as late as the 1970s became known as Renwick and catered for boys and girls, and was situated along Bong Bong Road. Two homes were located along the Old Southern Road near Diamond Fields Road. An apology was issued by the NSW Government in 2013 for the cruel practices suffered by many of the children who spent time in this institution. The institutions alumni are now in the process of having one of the homes donated by the government as a museum and dedicated building to remind of the injustices perpetrated against children.

The Catholic teaching order, the Marist Brothers, conducted a juniorate (high school for intending brothers) from 1906. A teacher was Br Charles Howard, who became world Superior General of the order. The site is now a retreat and spirituality centre called The Hermitage.

In March 2007, the Highlands Marketplace was opened. The complex is located on the Old Hume Highway towards Welby. The building has retail franchises such as Big W, Woolworths, Priceline and many others. It is built upon the original iron works site dating back to the 1800s. There is a display of some of the original remains of this historical site in the carpark, interpretive signs recording the history. In November 2008, a new shopping complex was opened alongside the Highlands Marketplace known as the Highlands Hub. It has as of 2017 many shops and Service NSW being the RMS.

== Geology and geography ==
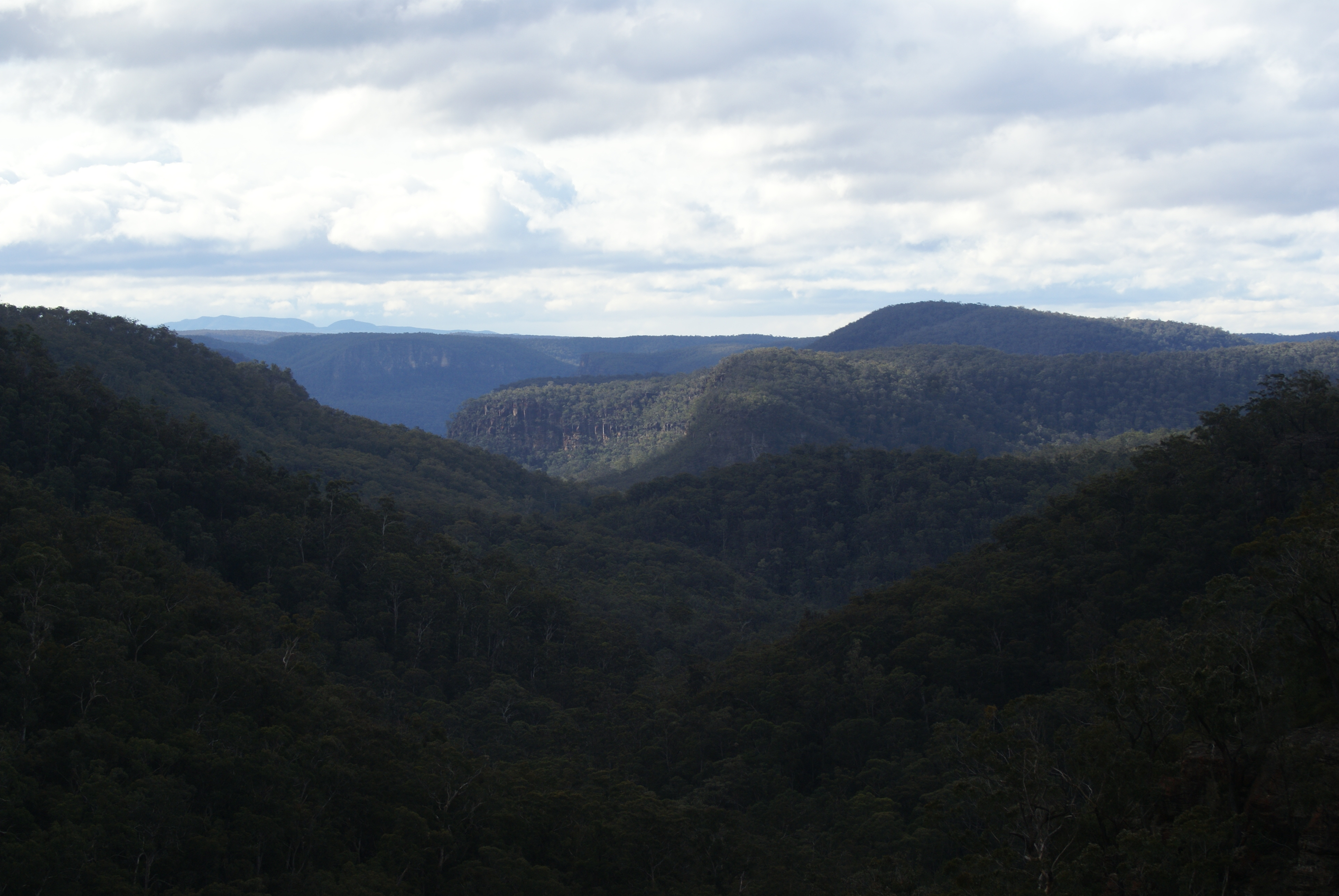
View from Katoomba Lookout on Mount Alexandra

The town lies between three small mountain reserves, Mount Alexandra 780 metres (2,560 ft) above sea level, Mount Gibraltar 888 metres (2,913 ft) above sea level and Ninety Acre Hill (part of the greater Gibbergunyah Reserve) 800 metres (2,600 ft) above sea level.

In 1903 Douglas Mawson and Thomas Griffith Taylor published a geological paper on Mittagong, New South Wales, "The geology of Mittagong".

Popular among locals and visitors is a small man-made lake, Lake Alexandra, that feeds into the nearby Nattai River. Lookouts are available at all three reserves for viewing. Lookouts on Mount Gibraltar include Bowral Lookout, Mittagong Lookout and Mount Jellore Lookout. Lookouts on Mount Alexandra include Katoomba Lookout and Box Vale Track Lookout. Gibbergunyah Reserve include the Gib Lookout and Ninety Acre Hill Lookout.

Mount Gibraltar can also be seen up close when travelling to Bowral from Mittagong along Bowral Road. The Southern Highlands Shale Forest and Woodland vegetation community lies within the town.

== Attractions ==
Today, the town offers visitors the chance to explore its history, scenery, small waterfalls, bushwalks and its famed "Waratah" flowering in November. A chamber music festival is held each Easter. Tourists can visit Mount Gibraltar, Lake Alexandra and various wineries located around and in Mittagong. It also features one of the first iron mining sites in Australia, close to Lake Alexandra. The main street boasts a wide array of retailers and antique shops.

Notably, Mittagong is close to many of the Southern Highland's wineries and cellar doors. The wineries have established themselves in the region since the 1980s due to the soil and climate of Mittagong which is believed to be perfect for viticulture.

Mittagong is home to an abandoned historical building complex known as "The Maltings". In the past, The Maltings served as malthouses for the old major beer company of New South Wales, Tooth and Co. One of the malthouse buildings can be seen when entering Mittagong on the Old Hume Highway from Braemar. This building is one of the original buildings and is over 100 years old. This complex is abandoned and in decay; a few years ago it was subject to an attempted renovation, which was soon stopped.

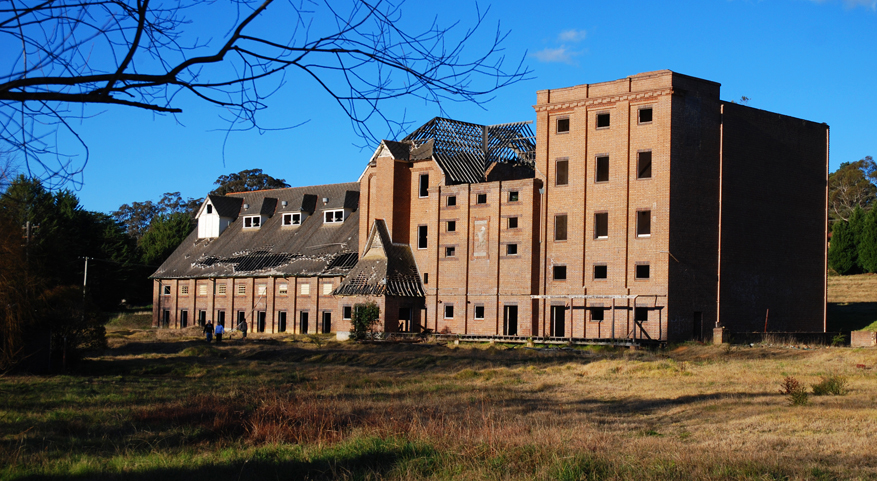
One of two major buildings that make up the Maltings

== Population ==
According to the 2021 census, the town of Mittagong had a population of 6,090.

At the 2016 census, the Mittagong Statistical Area 2, which includes the Mittagong town centre and the small surrounding villages of Welby, Balaclava, Braemar and Willow Vale, had a population of 8,999. Aboriginal and Torres Strait Islander people made up 2.5% of the population. 76.5% of people were born in Australia. The most common countries of birth were England 5.0% and New Zealand 1.4%. 86.7% of people only spoke English at home. The most common responses for religion were No Religion 27.0%, Catholic 23.4% and Anglican 21.5%.

The Mittagong State Suburb, which does not include the surrounding villages, had a population of 5,767. Aboriginal and Torres Strait Islander people made up 1.7% of the population. 76.2% of people were born in Australia. The next most common country of birth was England at 5.2%. 87.1% of people only spoke English at home. The most common responses for religion were No Religion 27.9%, Catholic 22.1% and Anglican 21.7%.

Historical population
Year	Pop.	±%
1921	1,435	—
1933	1,747	+21.7%
1947		—
1954	2,372	—
1961	2,621	+10.5%
1966	2,837	+8.2%
1971	3,624	+27.7%
1976	3,865	+6.7%
1981	4,266	+10.4%
1986	4,828	+13.2%
1991	5,666	+17.4%
1996	6,088	+7.4%
2001	6,257	+2.8%
2006	6,299	+0.7%
2011	5,722	−9.2%
2016	5,767	+0.8%
2021	6,090	+5.6%
Source: Australian Bureau of Statistics data.

== Transport ==
Mittagong is on the Old Hume Highway, which linked Sydney, Canberra and Melbourne, but the highway was diverted in 1992. The opening of the bypass was expected by someto negatively affect business in towns bypassed like Mittagong, but instead the location has become a rest stop for drivers and a daytripper destination from Sydney, only around one hour away. Moreover, Mittagong can be accessed from the Hume Highway in the north via the Aylmerton/Braemar ramp and in the south via the Welby ramp.

Mittagong railway station is served by the Southern Highlands Line with regular services to and from Sydney and Moss Vale, with some services extending Goulburn. Long-distance services to Canberra and Melbourne also stop at the station.

The town is also home to the bus company Berrima Buslines depot. Berrima Buslines services the entire Wingecarribee Shire.

A number of long-distance coach operators service Mittagong for Canberra, Melbourne and Adelaide. Priors Scenic Express operates a service six days a week to Greater Sydney (Campelltown, Liverpool and Parramatta) and to the Shoalhaven and South Coast of New South Wales.

== Heritage listings ==
Mittagong has a number of heritage-listed sites, including:

- Main Southern railway: Mittagong railway station
- Old South Road: Hassall and Jefferis Cottages
- 5 Station Street: Old Mittagong Post Office

== Churches ==
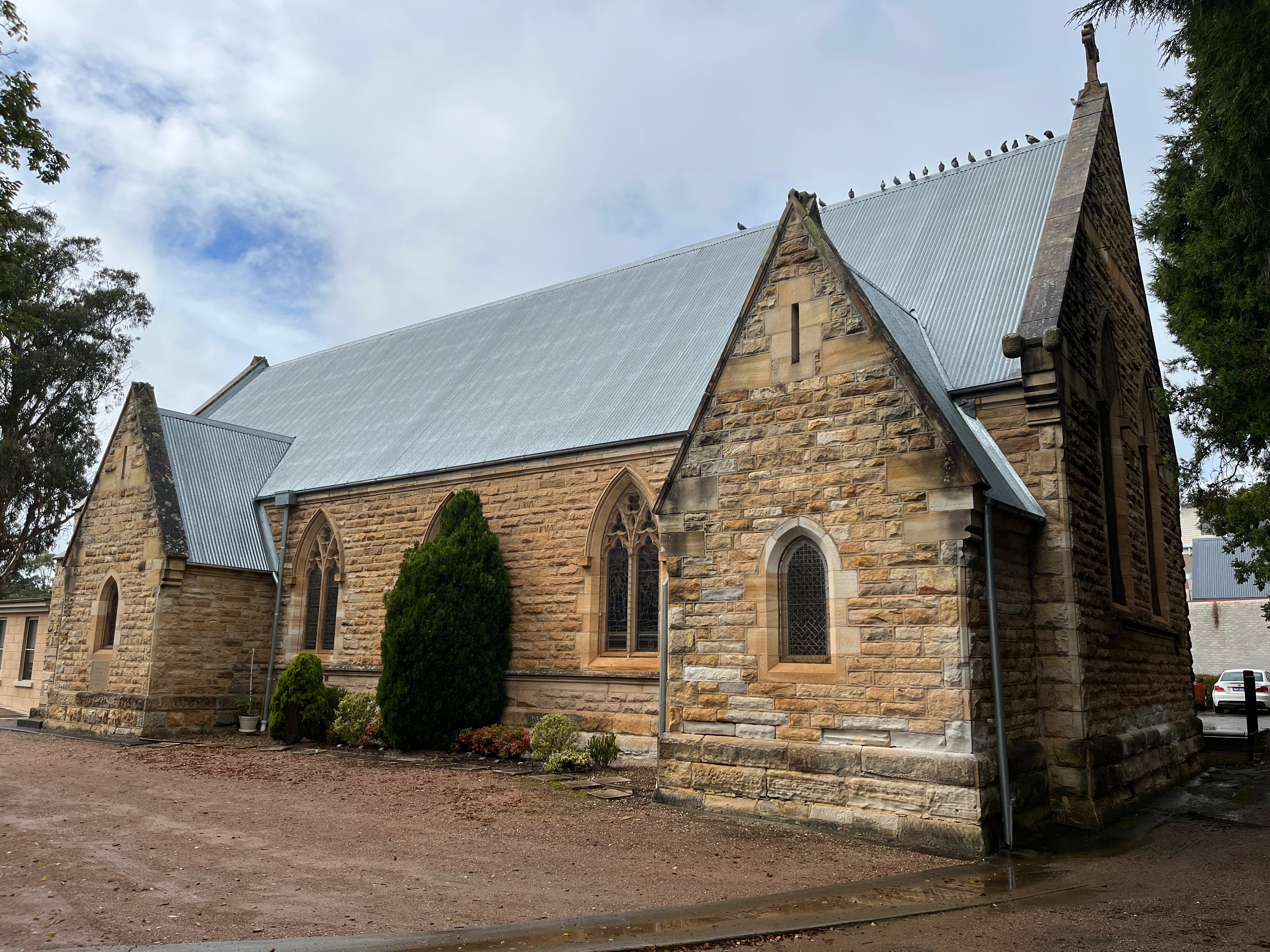
St Stephen's Anglican Church

- St Stephen's Anglican Church – Cnr Main St & Station St
- St Michael's Catholic Church – Albert Street
- Highlands Baptist Church (Welby)
- Mittagong Church of Jesus Christ of Latter-Day Saints
- Highlands Christian Church – Regent Street
- Southern Highlands Foursquare Church (Pentecostalism)
- Mittagong Uniting Church
- Mittagong Presbyterian Church

== Schools ==
- Frensham School
- Gib Gate Primary School
- Mittagong Public School
- St Michael's Catholic Primary School
- Tangara School (Special Education)
- Mittagong TSB (Renwick)

== Climate ==
Climate data for Mittagong are sourced at nearby Bowral (Parry Drive), in operation from 1961 to 2015. Summers are warm to mild, whereas winters are cool and spring is generally dry.

Climate data for Bowral (Parry Drive, 1961–2015); 690 m AMSL; 34.49° S, 150.40° E
Month	Jan	Feb	Mar	Apr	May	Jun	Jul	Aug	Sep	Oct	Nov	Dec	Year
Record high °C (°F)	40.0 (104.0)	39.1 (102.4)	35.7 (96.3)	31.5 (88.7)	25.5 (77.9)	20.1 (68.2)	20.3 (68.5)	23.8 (74.8)	29.1 (84.4)	32.4 (90.3)	38.3 (100.9)	37.2 (99.0)	40.0 (104.0)
Mean daily maximum °C (°F)	25.5 (77.9)	24.4 (75.9)	22.4 (72.3)	19.3 (66.7)	15.4 (59.7)	12.4 (54.3)	11.6 (52.9)	13.4 (56.1)	16.3 (61.3)	19.0 (66.2)	21.4 (70.5)	23.8 (74.8)	18.7 (65.7)
Mean daily minimum °C (°F)	13.4 (56.1)	13.5 (56.3)	11.6 (52.9)	8.2 (46.8)	5.3 (41.5)	3.5 (38.3)	2.1 (35.8)	3.1 (37.6)	5.3 (41.5)	7.7 (45.9)	9.8 (49.6)	11.6 (52.9)	7.9 (46.3)
Record low °C (°F)	2.1 (35.8)	1.8 (35.2)	−0.7 (30.7)	−2.2 (28.0)	−6.3 (20.7)	−8.2 (17.2)	−11.2 (11.8)	−6.1 (21.0)	−5.7 (21.7)	−2.6 (27.3)	−2.2 (28.0)	−1.4 (29.5)	−11.2 (11.8)
Average precipitation mm (inches)	81.9 (3.22)	98.4 (3.87)	95.2 (3.75)	75.8 (2.98)	69.6 (2.74)	84.0 (3.31)	45.3 (1.78)	61.6 (2.43)	55.8 (2.20)	71.6 (2.82)	92.4 (3.64)	78.6 (3.09)	931.7 (36.68)
Average precipitation days	13.5	13.4	13.3	11.1	11.2	11.2	9.9	9.6	10.2	11.6	13.5	12.6	141.1
Average afternoon relative humidity (%)	57	64	61	61	65	67	64	56	54	56	60	56	60

Shorter-term data are found at the Moss Vale AWS (Airport) since 2001.

Climate data for Moss Vale AWS (2001–2022); 678 m AMSL; 34.53° S, 150.42° E
Month	Jan	Feb	Mar	Apr	May	Jun	Jul	Aug	Sep	Oct	Nov	Dec	Year
Record high °C (°F)	40.9 (105.6)	41.2 (106.2)	37.0 (98.6)	30.7 (87.3)	23.4 (74.1)	20.3 (68.5)	21.4 (70.5)	22.5 (72.5)	30.4 (86.7)	31.7 (89.1)	37.9 (100.2)	41.1 (106.0)	41.2 (106.2)
Mean daily maximum °C (°F)	26.2 (79.2)	24.4 (75.9)	21.8 (71.2)	19.2 (66.6)	15.5 (59.9)	12.5 (54.5)	11.9 (53.4)	13.4 (56.1)	16.7 (62.1)	19.5 (67.1)	22.0 (71.6)	24.1 (75.4)	18.9 (66.1)
Mean daily minimum °C (°F)	14.2 (57.6)	14.0 (57.2)	12.1 (53.8)	8.7 (47.7)	4.9 (40.8)	3.4 (38.1)	2.5 (36.5)	3.0 (37.4)	5.4 (41.7)	7.9 (46.2)	10.5 (50.9)	12.2 (54.0)	8.2 (46.8)
Record low °C (°F)	4.1 (39.4)	5.1 (41.2)	2.2 (36.0)	−2.5 (27.5)	−3.4 (25.9)	−6.3 (20.7)	−5.7 (21.7)	−5.4 (22.3)	−4.0 (24.8)	−2.0 (28.4)	−0.1 (31.8)	2.0 (35.6)	−6.3 (20.7)
Average precipitation mm (inches)	65.0 (2.56)	101.4 (3.99)	96.6 (3.80)	55.9 (2.20)	48.3 (1.90)	76.5 (3.01)	63.7 (2.51)	54.7 (2.15)	41.9 (1.65)	52.8 (2.08)	72.3 (2.85)	60.1 (2.37)	784.5 (30.89)
Average precipitation days	13.2	14.2	16.6	15.7	15.0	16.8	13.8	12.3	11.5	12.1	14.2	12.5	167.9
Average afternoon relative humidity (%)	51	60	59	58	60	63	61	53	51	51	56	52	56
