= History of Bowral =

History of an Australian town

Bowral is a town in the Southern Highlands of New South Wales, Australia. It has a history spanning nearly 200 years.

== Pre-colonial times ==
The Bowral area during pre-colonial times was a part of land that belonged to the Tharawal Aboriginal Tribe. However, no permanent aboriginal settlement occurred because of the area's extreme climate. The name Bowral is believed to be derived from the Aboriginal word "Bowrel" which loosely translates into the word "High".

== European discovery and early settlement: 1780–1830s ==
The area of Bowral was first traversed in 1798 by ex-convict John Wilson and his search party. Wilson's search party had been commissioned by Governor Hunter to explore south of the new colony of Sydney.

After Wilson's exploration a series of expeditions followed decades later led by John Warby and Botanist George Caley (an associate of Joseph Banks), the Hume brothers and later, the famous pioneer explorers, John Oxley and Charles Throsby.

In 1817, Charles Throsby was given land by Governor Lachlan Macquarie of the New South Wales colony. Throsby established a small township named Bong Bong which today is located 7 km south of Bowral. Throsby built Old South Road, a road that lead from Stonequarry (Picton) and Sydney to Goulburn and the southern plains of New South Wales.

Governor Macquarie had also given 2,400 acres (9.7 km2) to John Oxley through a land grant. This would one day constitute the present-day Bowral. John Oxley never lived in the area but he sent his sons there to establish sheep and cattle farming. Oxley's sons named the area around Bowral "Wingecarribee"; the current name of the local government area of the Southern Highlands.

In 1831, 3,000 acres (12 km2) had been granted to what is known today as East Bowral to a Sydney business man, Edward Riley who passed ownership to his son, George.

== Village: 1840–1850s ==
During 1857–1858, John Oxley's sons, John Norton Oxley and Henry Molesworth Oxley built the locally renowned "Wingecarribbee" homestead that remains until this day. The homestead held the Wingecarribee (modern-day Bowral) village's Church of England services. The homestead is currently privately owned. It is during this period in time that Henry conveyed his share of the 4,200 acre grant to his older brother John. John subdivided 200 acres (0.81 km2) after it was known that the railway would be constructed through the district. The arrival of the railway in 1867 spurred the development of Bowral from a private village into a township. Henry also subdivided the land for farming purposes, which later led to Bowral's economic growth.

In 1859, John Oxley promised to give land for a church, rectory, and glebe (land to support the parish priest).

== Township and railway: 1860–2020s ==
During the mid to late 19th Century (1860–1890s), Bowral rapidly grew as a town and by the end of the 1890s it had a bakery, blacksmith, newsagency, general store, hotels, and a post office. It was during this time that Bowral experienced an influx of new residents due to the construction of the railway line from Sydney to Melbourne.

=== Churches and schools ===
In 1863, an Anglican stone church which doubled as a school was built on the glebe covering 43 acres (170,000 m^{2}). It was located near the present day Bradman Museum. It had 100 enrollments upon its opening. The students were mostly children of railway workers.

In 1864, Wesleyans or Methodists built a chapel on Bendooley St.

In 1874, a first Anglican church was replaced by the church of St. Simon and St. Jude, designed by Edmund Blacket.

In 1879, an Anglican rectory was built near the church.

In 1881, the Methodist chapel was demolished and was replaced with a church.

The church of St. Simon and St. Jude was rebuilt in 1887 because it could no longer accommodate the growing population. Today, only Blackett's belltower remains.

During the 1880s, a school and hall was built and extended the Anglican church's ground. However, due to Henry Parkes' Public Education Act, the school went under state education. The school remains today as the local primary school across the road from the church.

In 1883, a religious event occurred in Bowral when the Salvation Army famously preached, performed, and paraded in Bong Bong's St.

The first Catholic Church of Bowral was built in 1891 on Banyette St. This was the first incursion of the Catholic Church into Bowral. Bowral has been considered a "Protestant" town unlike its neighboring towns Moss Vale and Mittagong, which hosted large Catholic population.

In 1926, the Methodist church was demolished and rebuilt with the formation of the Uniting Church in Australia.

In 1937, a Baptist church was constructed on Merrigang Street. Its design was the work of Edmund Blacket.

In 1983, a Christian school began (with 7 students) in the back hall of Bowral Baptist Church. Subsequently, a block of land was purchased in East Bowral, as a new site for classrooms. The school, currently named Southern Highlands Christian School is fully operational, educating both Primary and Secondary students.

This original Catholic church on Banyette St. was sold to the Evangelical Church in 1986 and rebuilt next to St. Thomas Aquinas School and presbytery in the same year.

=== Hotels ===
The first hotel of Bowral was built in 1862 and named the "Wingecarribee Inn". The building was built on the corner of modern-day Merrigang St. and Bong Bong St. (where the current Royal Hotel is). The second hotel was built in 1887 named "The Grand Hotel & Motel". The building had 35 rooms. The original Hotel building remains but only a quarter of the building is used as hotel. The building was formerly known as "The Grand Bar and Brasserie" on the corner of Wingecarribee St. and Bong Bong St. It was sold in 2014 after 126 years in operation.

=== Town development and railway ===
During and after the construction of the railway line from Mittagong to Moss Vale in the late 1860s and 1870s, there were petitions brought forth by recent settlers to open a station at Bowral. These petitions as well as the increased commerce, agriculture, and industry in Bowral led to the construction of the Bowral Station, which opened in 1886. The present Bowral station is where the original station was built. The station was originally called "Burradoo", however the name was changed to "Bowrall" and then, at the turn of the century, to "Bowral," its modern spelling. (For more information, see Bowral railway station)

In 1876, milk was shipped from Bowral Station and during the 1880s, due to the railway shipping to Sydney and Goulburn, a tannery was also built. The tannery had operated where the current Commonwealth Bank stands today.

Before the construction of the Grand Hotel, the site was where the first School of Arts was built. The building was rebuilt to its current position in Bendooley St. in 1884. The current Police station was built three years later next to the School of Arts on Wingecarribee St. In 1896, the Bowral courthouse was added next to the police station.

In 1886, Bowral established itself as a municipality. It covered 1,600 acres (6.5 km2) and was home to a population of 1,000. The Victorian Imperial-style town hall of the municipality was built in 1890 next to the police station.

A signal of Bowral's significant growth into a town was established when in 1889 Bowral's lamps were lit by gas. The demand of gas paved way for Bowral's first private gas-works in 1890.

== Country town: 1900–1950s ==
Bowral, once an independent municipality during the early 20th century, became part of Nattai Shire based in Mittagong in 1906. It was also during this time where the Bowral population boomed. In the 1920s–30s, Bowral developed a reticulated water supply, the construction of Bowral Hospital and the installation of electricity into Bowral from Port Kembla in 1925. Ten years later, the town sewerage system was constructed. It was in 1923 when Robert Loseby donated some land behind Bowral Hospital to serve as a local park, which became a major sports ground, boasting of two ovals and, later, a greyhound track. Currently, the park is home to a skatepark, tennis court, youth center, and sporting field known as "Loseby Oval".

=== Development of schools ===
Catholics began relocating into the area after the construction of several Catholic churches and this development called for new Catholic schools. In 1904, the nuns of Our Lady of Sacred Heart bought land known as "Belmore Park" on Centennial Road and established a convent school. In 1924, Belmore Park became a boys college under the nuns of Our Lady of Sacred Heart. Belmore Park today serves as a park and function center.

During World War II, a stronger Catholic presence was felt when St. Thomas Aquinas Catholic School and a new presbytery was built. Just three years later, in 1946, Missionaries of the Sacred Heart bought a large property in Burradoo and established it as Chevalier College which eventually became the largest secondary school in the Southern Highlands and Wollondilly Regions. The college is established as a day and boarding school for boys. However, in the 1970s, Chevalier had ceased to become a boarding school and became co-education upon the closure of the girls convent school in Moss Vale.

In 1928–30, Bowral High School was built. It served as a tribute building to the ANZACs of the Great War. Its original building remains until this day. The school served as the prime high school for the area from Picton to Moss Vale until Moss Vale's primary school was upgraded into a high school.

=== The Springett family ===
The Springett Family had established themselves in Bowral when they opened a general store in 1926. Two decades later the Springett Family expanded this general store into a bakery and soft-drinks plant. These buildings were the first to distribute soft drinks and sliced bread in the Highlands. The soft drinks plant was the first plant to make the soft drink Passiona in Australia.

=== Industry ===
In 1920, Bowral's Brickworks were built to supply the booming residential and commercial growth in the Southern Highlands region. Bowral Brickworks remain until this day. The town also began shipping milk to nearby towns since the 1870s and this paved way in the 1930s for the construction of Bowral's Old Milk Factory. This milk factory dominated the dairy industry around Bowral. The Old Milk Factory remains to this day.

=== Garden and reserves ===
Since the late 19th century, the residents of Bowral had been gardeners, planting many decorative European trees and plants. This legacy paved the way for the construction of "Corbett Gardens" in 1911. The gardens are named after Ada Corbett. The gardens were established as a public garden with a large band rotunda. The rotunda was dismantled in the 1950s and rebuilt in the 1990s by donation from the Springett family.

In 1958, Corbett Gardens put Bowral on the map with cultivation of thousands of tulips that would bloom during September. This annual tradition became known as "Tulip Time".

In 1919, 60 acres (240,000 m^{2}) of Mount Gibraltar was decreed as a nature reserve.

=== Hospital and ambulance service ===
The town of Bowral had to rely on the Berrima District Hospital in Berrima for the town's health needs until 1863 when Jacob Ward becoming Bowral's first doctor. In the late 1920s and 1930s, Bowral established its own health-care system with the construction of Bowral Hospital in 1935, which was expanded in 1959. The hospital added an ambulance station in 1935 in Bong Bong St. The station was later sold and is currently used as a commercial space.

== Modern town: 1950–present ==
In 1972 the Springett Family opened Springetts' Arcade in the town. In 1983 the arcade was extended into the site of the closed Hot Canary Supermarket, one of the first "no frills" bulk grocery stores established by the Springetts.

The Nattai Shire (Mittagong Shire) incorporated with Moss Vale's Wingecarribee Shire in 1980 to form the Wingecarribee Shire. In 1986, St. Thomas Aquinas Catholic Church was built next to the St. Thomas Aquinas School and presbytery, and the old one was sold to the Evangelical Church. The 1980s also saw the construction of Oxley Mall.

In 1990 the state sold unused hospital land next to Bowral Hospital, which was then built into Bowral Private Hospital. Later in the 1990s, land in East Bowral was sub-divided and developed into a modern suburb, nearly doubling Bowral's population.

== See also ==
- History of New South Wales
