= Yean Cottage, Anglewood Estate =

Anglewood House
- Location within New South Wales Location within Australia
- 34.4934°S 150.4050°E
- Location: Yean Street, Burradoo, Wingecarribee Shire, New South Wales, Australia

History
- Built: 1890–1890

Site notes
- Architect: Maurice Bingham Adams (a close copy of his work)
- Owner: Valdis Berzins Pty Ltd

New South Wales Heritage Register
- Official name: Anglewood House
- Type: state heritage (built)
- Designated: 2 April 1999
- Reference no.: 639
- Type: Cottage
- Category: Residential buildings (private)

Anglewood House is a heritage-listed former residence, later used as a private school, youth training facility and special school, and now private house at Yean Street, Burradoo, in the Southern Highlands of New South Wales, Australia. It was built in 1890. It was added to the New South Wales State Heritage Register on 2 April 1999.

== History ==
Anglewood is the original name of Yean Cottage and of the whole Estate. It was built in the early 1890s by Arthur Bruce Smith, who was Secretary of Public Works for the Sir Henry Parkes government, later became the Colonial Treasurer. Contrary to the NSW Heritage Listing for the property, Arthur Bruce Smith was never Attorney-General for Australia.

The design of the house and the interior layout is copied very closely from a house called Queensmead at Windsor in England, designed for Colonel Reginald Talbot by Maurice Bingham Adams. Adams (1849-1933) was a prominent and influential British architect of the "Arts and Crafts" school of design. He worked for some years from 1872 as a staff member and then editor of Building News, illustrating "Queen Anne" buildings in engravings. Adams was notable for his furniture and interior designs in Queen Anne style, and, as an architect for Bedford Park in Chiswick and Bournville near Birmingham, became very much involved in the Garden Suburb movement. He became fashionable society architect and designed Caerleon in Bellevue Hill for Charles Fairyase. The construction of this house was supervised by Harvey Kent.

The Smith family lived at Anglewood for 10 years from its completion in 1894 until 1904. It has been falsely rumoured that Smith decided it was too far to go all the way to Bowral to catch the train and that he built his own private railway station (Burradoo railway station), just outside his front gate so he could more conveniently board a train there. However Burradoo Station had actually existed since 1870 (24 years prior to Smith residing at Anglewood).

As a result of the 1890s bank crash, the house was sold to George James Sly, founder of the firm Sly and Russell Solicitors, a well known firm in the city of Sydney. Sly and his large family used it as their country house for many years.

In 1932 Anglewood became a private school, an annexe to the King's School (Sydney).

Twelve years later it was commissioned as a special school for male truants by the then Department of Child Welfare - the first school of its kind in Australia. The main building, called Yean Cottage was opened by Clive Evatt on 22 April 1944. Nattai Cottage was opened in 1946 (directly behind Yean Cottage) and Oxley Cottage in 1965. Anglewood continued to function as a special school for truants until 1979, having become co-educational in 1975.

In 1980, the Department of Youth and Community Services changed the function of the Unit to cater for 24 male and female adolescent State Wards, aged 10 years to 18 years.

In 1999 approval was granted to adaptively reuse Yean Cottage as an hotel and subdivide its grounds for cluster housing.

== Description ==
=== House ===
Anglewood is a very large and elaborately decorated Queen Anne Revival style house, with an extensive and very fine garden. The design of the house and the interior layout is copied very closely from Queensmead Cottage at Windsor, built when the Queen Anne Style was at its most elaborate flowering was a collection of all Adams' ideas on Queen Anne. Anglewood faithfully follows much of this idiom, elaborating on some, such as the arched brick bracing between chimneys at the east end and giving an Australian flavour to others such as Australian plants appearing in moulded plaster detailing.

The exterior of Anglewood is principally a soft red brick, much of it moulded or carved in finely detailed ornament. The bricks are said to have been imported from England especially for the house but this has not been established.

The first floor is timber framed and clad in terracotta shingling, hung with patterned bands of cut tiles. The walls of the first floor bay over the entrance are clad in rough cast render, as are gable ends and bands under some of the eaves. Much of the decoration is very unusual and possibly unique in Australia. Around the entrance bay, at string course level, are a series of curved sandstone blocks with shields, gargoyles, mashs, acanteurs etc. This work is very fine and appears to be in perfect condition.

Inside are fine timber panelling, moulded plaster, faience panels, colourful tiles and stained glass. Above the entrance hall was a three-storey central light well with coloured clerestorey lighting, now covered over at each floor level. There is a pleasant conservatory on the garden front. Quite a few alterations have been made internally, but some care has been taken not to destroy original material. A modern addition on the west side has occurred as is an external fire stair on the east end.

It was reported to be in good physical condition as at the time of its heritage listing. Quite a few alterations have been made internally, but some care has been taken not to destroy original material. Some of the internal alterations were carried out when Community Radio 2WKT FM received permission to build a studio on the third floor and commence transmitting programs to the Wingecarribee Shire population on 3 April 1987. It remained there till sometime in 1989.

=== Grounds ===
The house is surrounded by a superb garden with a magnificent collection of mature exotic trees and a most interesting collection of conifers. Much of the garden design dates back to when the house was built.

The original expanse of the grounds has been altered to suit the requirements of a school. However the driveway and garden immediately surrounding the house remain intact. The driveway ends in a gently serpentine pattern, past the gatehouse which is sited to make the grounds appear more important than they are. From the driveway glimpses of the rear of the house are seen; it travels along the eastern side, leaving the view of the front until the last second. The turning circle is small, in the shape of a teardrop and is enclosed by a strip of evergreen planting, which includes once fashionable palms and succulents. Original wire arches are placed at regular intervals around the planting belt, taking visitors through to a lawn which is edged with a shelter belt of pines.

The garden beds around the house are semi-circular, some edged with candystick moulded terracotta tiles, and the others with bricks set on a 45-degree angle for a sawtooth effect. The flower bed adjoining the eastern wing of the house is a geometric horseshoe-shaped design dissected by a path of crazy paving. The serpentine paths to the rear of the house would once have taken visitors through a series of colourful flower beds and shrubs that would have led to simply planted woodland.

== Heritage listing ==
Anglewood was listed on the New South Wales State Heritage Register on 2 April 1999 having satisfied the following criteria.

The place is important in demonstrating the course, or pattern, of cultural or natural history in New South Wales.

It is a climactic example of the full flowering of the "Queen Anne" Arts and Crafts school of architectural and interior design. It is associated with and a direct copy by Maurice B. Adams, R.I.B.A., a prominent and influential British architect of the Arts and Crafts school and a leading exponent of the Queen Anne Revival style. Adams is also represented in Australia through his design in Bellevue Hill for Charles Fairfax. It is associated with the Hon. Arthur Bruce Smith K.C., M.H.R., Secretary of Public Works and Colonial Treasurer under Parkes in NSW and first Federal Attorney General who has the house built as a country retreat. It is associated with its purchaser, George James Sly, founder of the well-known firm of solicitors, Sly and Russell, who used it as a country house for at least 40 years.

The place is important in demonstrating aesthetic characteristics and/or a high degree of creative or technical achievement in New South Wales.

It has an outstanding country house style of garden with many magnificent specimens of mature exotic trees, lawns, formal garden beds and a most unusual and varied collection of conifers. The garden illustrates the changes in design of garden layout and choice in plantings which have taken place from the 1890s when the garden was developed to the 1950s when the design was influenced by a keen gardener on the school staff.

The place has a strong or special association with a particular community or cultural group in New South Wales for social, cultural or spiritual reasons.

It has long association with an innovative government philosophy in youth training and education through its use as a home and special school for truants.

The place possesses uncommon, rare or endangered aspects of the cultural or natural history of New South Wales.

It is a rare and intact example in Australia of a style of architecture in its fully developed and richly decorated form, more often seen in the U.K. in country mansions and large town houses of the late 19th century.

The place is important in demonstrating the principal characteristics of a class of cultural or natural places/environments in New South Wales.

Both the exterior and interior form and detailing are representative of the most developed form of the Queen Anne Arts and Crafts school of architectural interior design.

== See also ==
- Queensmead School Windsor
