= Peppers, Craigieburn, Bowral =

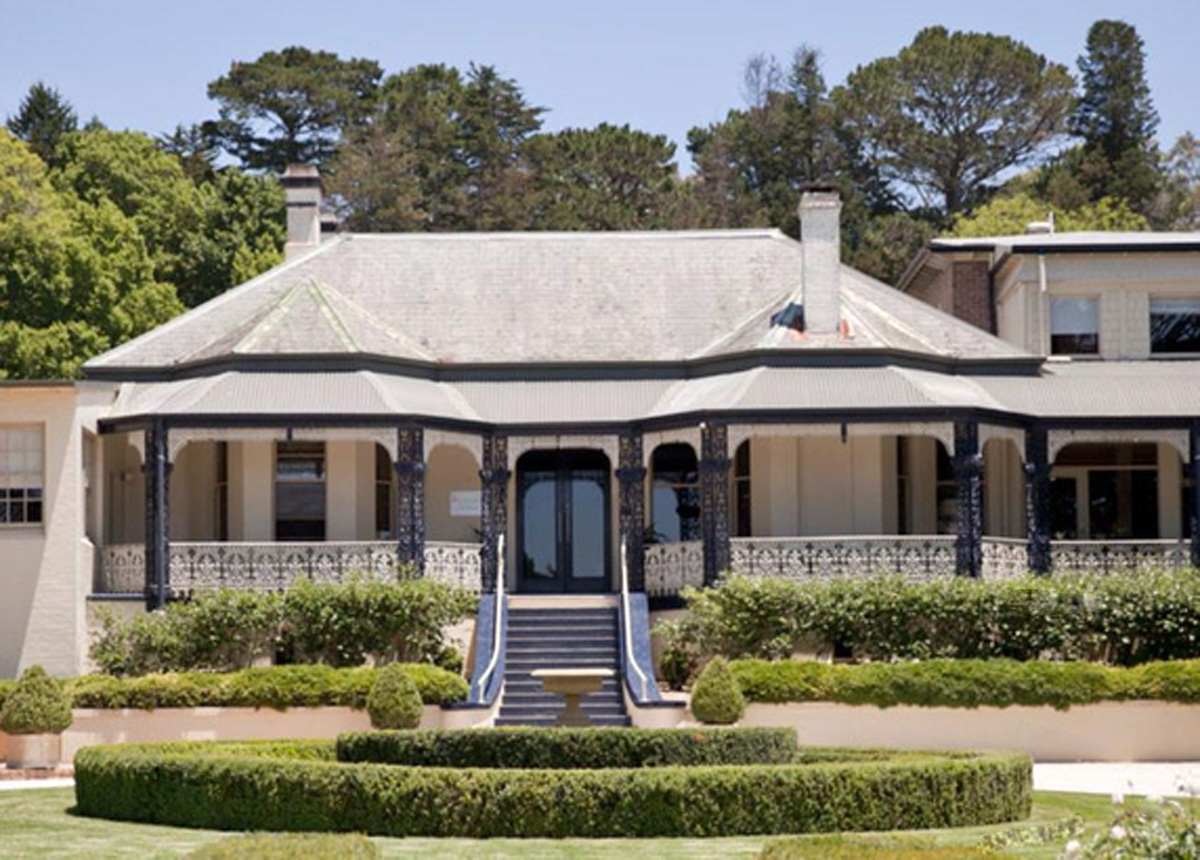
Craigieburn, Bowral

Craigieburn, Bowral is a house of historical significance as it was built in about 1885. It was originally the mountain retreat for a wealthy Sydney merchant and was owned by him for over twenty years. It was then the home of several other prominent people until about 1918 when it was converted into a hotel. Today it still provides hotel accommodation and is a venue for special events particularly weddings and conferences.

== Early history ==
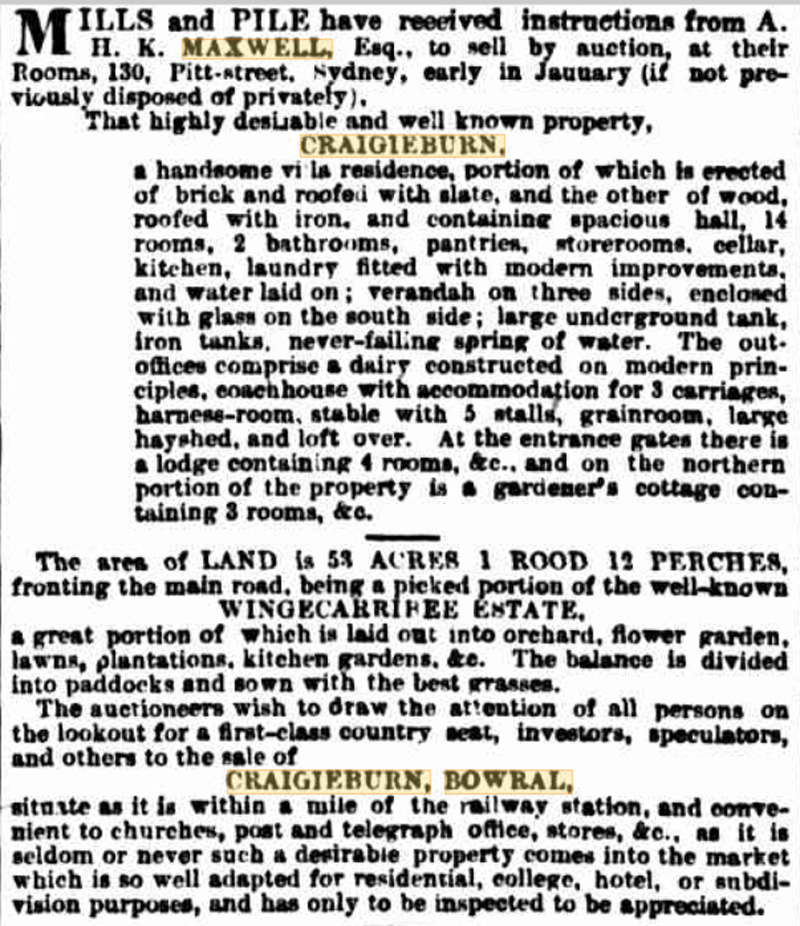
Advertisement for the sale of Craigieburn by Alexander Maxwell in 1888

Alexander Hamilton Keith Maxwell (1842-1907) built Craigieburn in about 1885. In June 1885 the builder John Joseph Campbell of Bowral advertised for tenders to haul 80 to 100 thousand bricks from a kiln to Mr Maxwell’s property. At the end of the year, Mrs. Maxwell placed an advertisement in the local paper for a “house and parlor maid” at Craigieburn, Bowral. John Campbell was one of the earliest pioneers of Bowral and built many of the town’s public and private buildings.

Alexander was born in Sydney in 1842. His father emigrated from Scotland to Australia in about 1840 and became the Registrar of the Sydney District Court. Alexander decided to become a merchant and was a partner in the firm of Caird, Maxwell, and Co. He was quite wealthy and had a home on Darlinghurst Road in Potts Point. He also bought land in other areas of New South Wales. In 1872 he married Elizabeth Catherine Taylor (1852-1922) who was the daughter of John Taylor of “Sugar Brae” in Waverley. The couple had three sons and two daughters.

In 1888 Alexander decided to advertise Craigieburn for sale but he subsequently decided to keep the property. The sale notice is shown. The family continued to use the house as a summer residence until Alexander died in 1907. They also allowed some of their friends and family to stay on the property during this time. Their daughter Marion (called May) Pilcher and her husband Herbert who was a Sydney barrister were often there. In 1894 Thomas Forster Knox and his family took the house for the summer.

Alexander died in 1907 and the house was bought by Joseph Cooper (1823-1909). He came from a family of wealthy pastoralists in the Hunter and New England districts. His brother was Theo Cooper and together they owned about six properties in this area. At his time both brothers, now widowers and in their 80s, decided to live in the Southern Highlands. Theo bought “Werrington” a large house in Burradoo at the same time that Joseph bought Craigieburn. Joseph died in 1909 and the property was advertised for sale. It was bought by the Minter family.

== Later owners ==
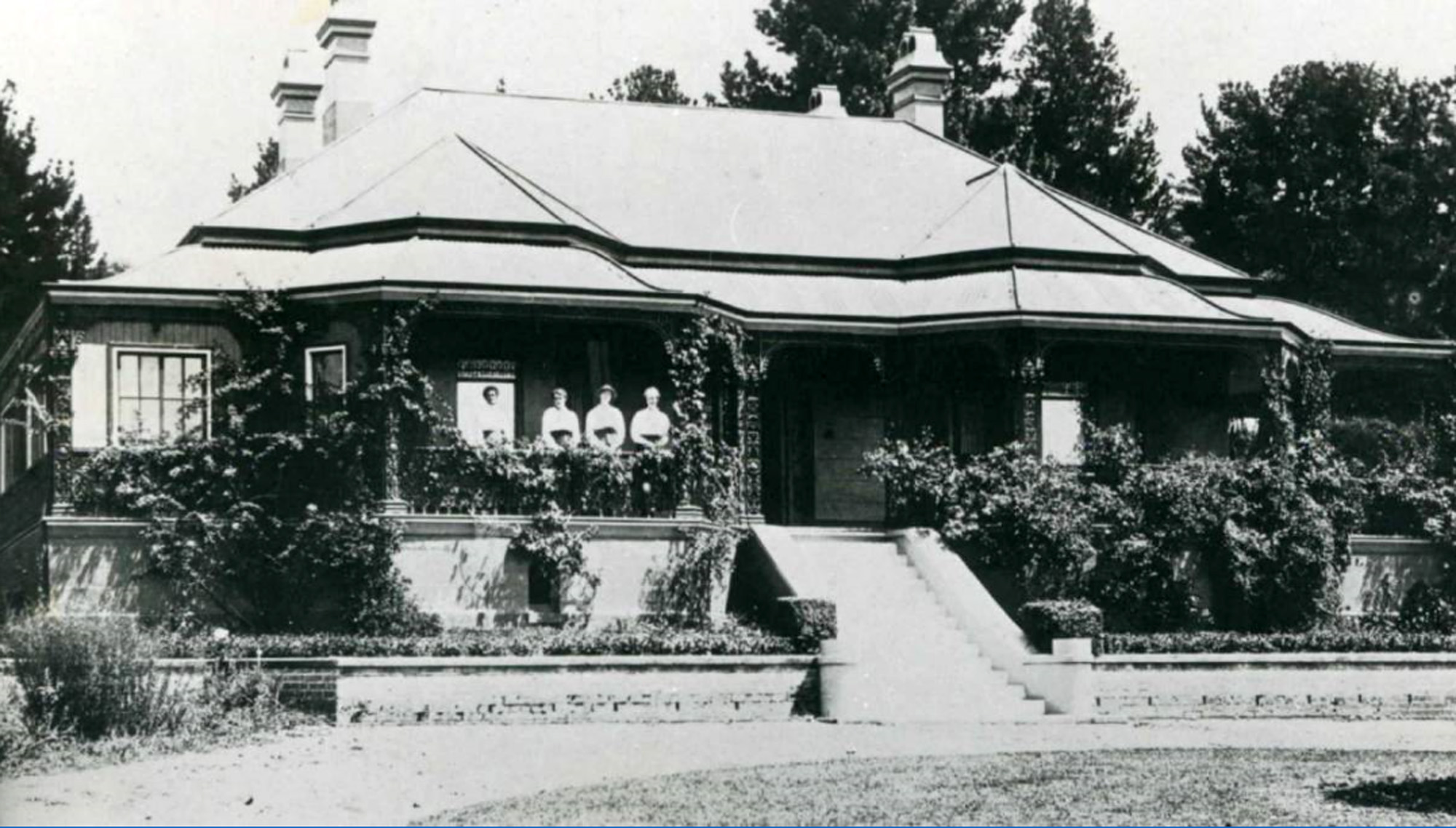
Criagieburn at the beginning of the 20th Century

Gordon Kennedy Minter (1858-1930) was also a wealthy pastoralist. He had properties at Condobolin, Canowindra, Grenfell and Forbes. He founded the Wooyeo Picnic Race Club and was one of the original members of the Pastoral, Agricultural and Horticultural Association at Canowindra. In 1880 he married Helena Townsend who was the daughter of Thomas Townsend, a grazier. The couple had five sons and four daughters. Three of his sons enlisted to fight in World War 1.

By 1918 Craigieburn was owned by Mrs Lydia Horton. She previously ran a boarding house in Neutral Bay. In partnership with Richard Henry Allen she bought Craigieburn and over the next ten years they made major additions to the property to convert it to one of the most exclusive hotels in the Southern Highlands. In 1919 they opened the golf course and the event was marked with a huge celebration which was described in detail in a newspaper of that time. Her daughter Freda Horton was frequently mentioned in the social pages and in 1926 was married at Bowral with the reception being held at Craigieburn. In 1945 she and Allen handed the management of the hotel to a Board of Directors.

Today the property operates as Peppers Craigieburn and provides hotel accommodation, dining facilities and is a venue for special events.
