= Bowral High School =

Location
- Aitken Road, Bowral, Southern Highlands, New South Wales; Australia; 34°29′18″S 150°25′27″E

Information
- Former names: Bowral District School; Bowral Intermediate High School
- Type: Government-funded co-educational comprehensive secondary day school
- Motto: Latin: Excelsior (Higher)
- Established: 1906; 120 years ago (as Bowral District School); 22 March 1930; 96 years ago (as Bowral Intermediate High School)
- School district: Wollondilly; Regional South
- Educational authority: New South Wales Education Standards Authority; New South Wales Department of Education
- Principal: Richard Finter
- Teaching staff: 69
- Years: 7–12
- Enrolment: ~800 (2018)
- Campus type: Regional
- Colours: Blue and white
- Slogan: Exceptional learning opportunities for all
- Website: bowral-h.schools.nsw.gov.au

Bowral High School is a government-funded co-educational comprehensive secondary day school, located in Bowral, a town in the Southern Highlands region of New South Wales, Australia.

Established in 1930 as a tribute to the Australian and New Zealand Army Corps (ANZAC) of World War I, the school caters for approximately 850 students from Year 7 to Year 12, of whom five percent identified as Indigenous Australians and twelve percent were from a language background other than English. The school district includes Bowral, East Bowral, Mittagong, Colo Vale, and Hill Top. The school is operated by the New South Wales Department of Education; and the current principal is Richard Finter.

== History ==
The first public school in Bowral was established around 1868. Secondary education was introduced in 1906 when a course was created at Bowral Public School to allow students to continue studying after primary school. The secondary school was known as Bowral District School. In 1915, the school had its first students pass the Leaving Certificate exams. In 1920, the school was named Bowral Intermediate High School, and enrolled 120 students. In 1921, the school received a visit from Lord Chelmsford.

In the mid-1920s, plans were made by the Bowral Parents and Citizens' Association (PCA) to erect a separate high school building from land purchased by the New South Wales Department of Education. The PCA raised funds to expand the area for the school, and continued to petition the Minister of Education to help fund the construction. In February 1928, enrolment at Bowral Intermediate High increased to 303 students, 51 more than the previous year, prompting the PCA to continue pressuring the government to build the school. By 1929, it had enrolled 389 students with 14 teachers.

On 8 June 1929, the Minister of Education David Henry Drummond and the mayor of Bowral laid the foundation stone for the new high school building. The land was a three-acre site on the outskirts of town. The building would be a two-story structure similar to Goulburn High School, and would accommodate about 420 students and 11 classrooms. It had an assembly hall, staff rooms, men's and women's lavatories, open-air balconies, and other features, The original estimate from builder W. A. Gazzard was £20,000, and later totaled about £25,000.

On 22 March 1930, Drummond returned to officially open the high school. Herbert Cowie served as the first headmaster. In December 1930, on the school's Speech Day, it was announced that the school's classification was raised to second class. Cowie reported that 392 students had enrolled at the peak of the opening in March, with 339 enrolled for the current quarter. The school was separated between the Upper courses for the Leaving Certificate and the Lower courses for the Intermediate Certificate. In 1935, Cowie died and the headmaster duties were passed to A.D. Watson. Classes in those times included two language classes and a non-language class, the last of which was some sort of woodworking, geography and technical drawing for boys, and art and needlework for the girls. A petition was brought forth to add domestic science (cooking, dietetics, physiology, hygiene) and agriculture classes. In 1937, Waston left the school.

Following World War II, Bowral High School was the only public high school to service students preparing for the Leaving Certificate between Picton to Goulburn until the opening of Moss Vale High School in 1964.

== Governance, admissions, and costs ==
Bowral is a public co-educational school operated by the New South Wales Department of Education. Bowral, along with Moss Vale High School follows the enrolment standards from the Education Reform Act 1990 where students are allocated based on their designated residential zones. Exceptions are occasionally granted for non-resident students. As a state public school, contributions are voluntary and are for expenses such as uniforms, school books and equipment, field trips, and extracurriculars. More general contributions are also made towards facilities and educational materials.

== Curriculum ==
Bowral follows the curriculum as directed by New South Wales Department of Education. Students are taught in the subjects of "English, mathematics, science, technology, creative arts, personal development, health and physical education, human society and its environment, languages". Mandatory courses are set by the New South Wales Education Standards Authority (NESA). The school also offers electives. NESA also endorses courses taken in Year 11 and 12 that are suitable for Australian Tertiary Admission Rank (ATAR) and courses that are classified as Vocational Education and Training (VET). Some courses count towards both ATAR and VET.

== Sports and traditions ==
Bowral has grouped students into four houses: Belmore, Fitzroy, Gibraltar, and Hume. Each house is headed by a house captain and vice-captain. The houses occasionally compete against each other in sporting events. The colours for each house are: Belmore (blue); Fitzroy (red); Gibraltar (yellow); and Hume (green).

Since 1928, Bowral High School has competed annually against Goulburn High School in a series of sports matches for the R.S. Smith Cup. Sports have included rugby, association football, cricket, basketball, and netball. In more recent years, the competitions have also included non-sporting events such as masterchef, spelling bees and computing.

== Campus ==
Bowral's main buildings include the original historical building built in 1929, a large three-storey block built in the 1970s and a few more buildings from the 1980s and 1990s. Facilities on Bowral High include science labs, computer labs, a library, kitchens, textile rooms, industrial art labs, basketball courts, amphitheatre/COLA area, quad, canteen. In 2015, the school built a memorial garden to commemorate the centenary of the ANZACS.

== Headmasters and principals ==
A listing of principals from the school since its opening in 1930.

- Herbert Cowie (1930–1935)
- Andrew Watson (1936–1937)
- Sydney Barker (1938–1953)
- Robert Wilson (1953–1965)
- Stanley Clutterbuck (1966–1970)
- Henry Waterhouse (1971–1974)
- John Jeffery (1975–1978)
- David McGrath (1978–1986)
- Ray Perrau (1987–1991)
- Lance Corr (1992–1994)
- Kathryn Brennan (1995–2005)
- Dianne Hennessy (2006–2009)
- Kim Paviour (2010–2018)
- Jason Conroy (2019–present)

== Notable alumni ==
- Don Bradman – cricketer, scored his first century at Bowral in 1920–21
- Chris Corrigan – businessman
- Miriam Lyons – Policy analyst, writer, commentator.
- Lizzie Pearl – Nine News reporter.
- Craig Reucassel – television actor and comedian
- Jai Rowell – Former Member of Parliament for Wollondilly

== See also ==
- List of government schools in New South Wales: A–F
- Education in Australia
