= ABC Illawarra =

Australian radio station

- Australia
- Broadcast area: Illawarra, Southern Highlands and northern parts of the South Coast
- Frequency: 97.3 MHz FM

Programming
- Format: Talk

Ownership
- Owner: Australian Broadcasting Corporation

History
- First air date: 6 March 1959 (AM); March 1991 (FM)

Technical information
- Transmitter coordinates: 34.623°S 150.694°E

Links
- Website: https://www.abc.net.au/illawarra/

ABC Illawarra is an ABC Local Radio station based in Wollongong and broadcasting to the Illawarra, Southern Highlands and northern parts of the South Coast regions in New South Wales, Australia. This includes the towns of Nowra, Shellharbour, Kiama, and Bowral. The station began as 2WN in 1959 originally broadcasting on the AM band. It now transmits on the main FM frequency of 97.3 MHz along with a low power FM repeater.

== See also ==
- List of radio stations in Australia
