= Elspeth McLachlan =

Australian scientist

Elspeth McLachlan FAA (born 22 July 1942), an Australian neuroscientist, is a world authority on neural pathways within the autonomic nervous system. Her work has included detailed analyses of transmission in autonomic ganglia to studies of the organisation of autonomic nervous pathways and their disorder in pathological states, particularly injuries to peripheral nerves and the spinal cord.

McLachlan was born in Bowral, New South Wales, Australia.

== Education ==
McLachlan was educated at the University of Sydney, from which institution she received Bachelor of Science degree in 1962, and a PhD in 1973, and a Doctor of Science degree in 1994.

== Career ==
- 1985–1993 – Visiting Professor, Christian-Albrechts-Universität zu Kiel, Germany
- 1987–1988 – National Health and Medical Research Council Principal Research Fellow and Associate Professor, School of Physiology and Pharmacology, University of New South Wales, Australia
- 1988–1993 – Professor and Head, Department of Physiology & Pharmacology, University of Queensland, Australia
- 1993–2011 – Senior Principal Research Fellow, Prince of Wales Medical Research Institute, Randwick, Australia
- 1999–2001 – Executive Head, Centre for Research Management, National Health & Medical Research Council, Canberra, Australia
- 2000–2003 – Investigador Asociado, Instituto de Neurociencias, Universidad Miguel Hernández, Alicante, Spain
- 2001–2006 – Pro-Vice Chancellor (Research) and Research Professor, University of New South Wales, Australia
- 2007–present – Emeritus Professor, University of New South Wales, Australia

== Honours and awards ==
- 2009: Honorary Member, Australasian Neuroscience Society
- 2009: Honorary Member, Australian Physiological Society
- 2006: Distinguished Achievement Award, Australasian Neuroscience Society
- 2003: Centenary Medal for contribution to the Australian community and science in medical research
- 1998: Ramaciotti Medal for Excellence in Biomedical Research
- 1997: Elected Fellow, Australian Academy of Science
- 1996, 1999: Invitation Fellowship, Japan Society for the Promotion of Science
- 1995 Orbeli Medal, Armenian Academy of Neuroscience
- 1993: Max-Planck-Research Prize (Max-Planck-Forschungspreis) for international collaborative research (with W. Jänig)

The Australasian Neuroscience Society announced the establishment of an annual Elspeth McLachlan Plenary Lecture in 2017.

== Selected publications ==
- McLachlan, EM; Jänig, W; Devor, M; Michaelis, M (1993). "Peripheral nerve injury triggers noradrenergic sprouting within dorsal root ganglia". Nature. 363 (6429): 543–6. Bibcode:1993Natur.363..543M. doi:10.1038/363543a0. PMID 8505981. S2CID 4342233.
- Jänig, W.; McLachlan, E.M. (1992). "Characteristics of function-specific pathways in the sympathetic nervous system". Trends in Neurosciences. 15 (12): 475–481. doi:10.1016/0166-2236(92)90092-M. PMID 1282743. S2CID 9881261.
- Sah, P; McLachlan, EM (1991). "Ca(2+)-activated K+ currents underlying the afterhyperpolarization in guinea pig vagal neurons: a role for Ca(2+)-activated Ca2+ release". Neuron. 7 (2): 257–64. doi:10.1016/0896-6273(91)90264-z. PMID 1873029. S2CID 9753479.
- McLachlan, Elspeth M; Martin, A. R. (1981). "Non-linear summation of end-plate potentials in the frog and mouse". Journal of Physiology. 311: 307–24. doi:10.1113/jphysiol.1981.sp013586. PMC 1275411. PMID 6267255.
- Schmid, A.B.; Coppieters, M.W.; Ruitenberg, M.J.; McLachlan, E.M. (2013). "Local and remote immune-mediated inflammation after mild peripheral nerve compression in rats". Journal of Neuropathology and Experimental Neurology. 72 (7): 662–680. doi:10.1097/NEN.0b013e318298de5b. PMID 23771220.
- Tripovic, D.; McLachlan, E.M.; Brock, J.A. (2013). "Removal of half the sympathetic innervation does not reduce vasoconstrictor responses in rat tail artery". The Journal of Physiology. 591 (11): 2867–2884. doi:10.1113/jphysiol.2012.250365. PMC 3690691. PMID 23551946.
- Tripovic, D., Pianova, S., McLachlan, E.M. and Brock, J.A. (2011) Slow and incomplete sympathetic reinnervation of rat tail artery restores the amplitude of nerve-evoked contractions provided a perivascular plexus is present. AJP Heart and Circulatory Physiology 300, H541-554
