= Burradoo railway station =

Railway station in New South Wales, Australia

Burradoo
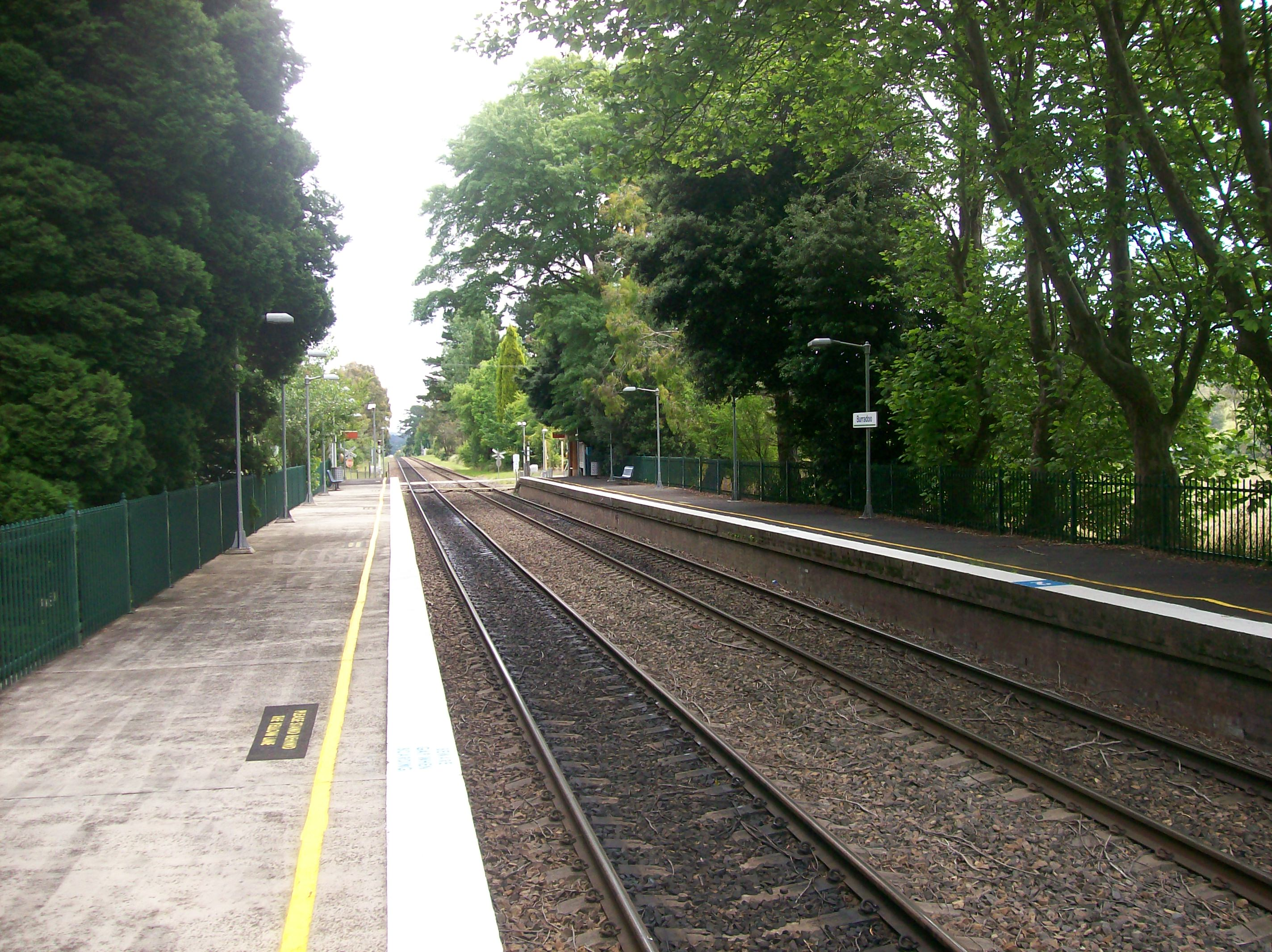
- Southbound view from Platform 2, December 2011

General information
- Location: Station Street, Burradoo; Australia
- Coordinates: 34°29′39″S 150°23′54″E
- Elevation: 665 metres (2,182 ft)
- Owner: Transport Asset Manager of New South Wales
- Operator: Sydney Trains
- Line: Main Southern
- Distance: 138.84 kilometres (86.27 mi) from Central
- Platforms: 2 side
- Tracks: 2

Construction
- Structure type: Ground

Other information
- Station code: BUO
- Website: Transport for NSW

History
- Opened: 1870

Passengers
- 2025: 5,167 (year); 14 (daily) (Sydney Trains, NSW TrainLink)

Services
Preceding station	Intercity Trains	Following station
Moss Vale Terminus or towards Goulburn	Southern Highlands Line	Bowral towards Campbelltown or Central
Location

Burradoo railway station is located on the Main Southern line in New South Wales, Australia. It serves the town of Burradoo, opening in 1870.

== Platforms and services ==
Burradoo has two side platforms. It is serviced by Sydney Trains Southern Highlands Line services travelling between Campbelltown and Moss Vale with 2 weekend morning services to Sydney Central and limited evening services to Goulburn.

Platform	Line	Stopping pattern	Notes
1	SHL	services to Campbelltown; 2 weekend morning services to Sydney Central	
2	SHL	services to Moss Vale evening services to Goulburn (2 weekday, 1 weekend)	
