= East Bowral, New South Wales =

East Bowral New South Wales
- Coordinates: 34°29′58″S 150°27′34″E
- Population: 1,581 (2011)
- Postcode(s): 2576
- Elevation: 703 m (2,306 ft)
- Location: 137 km (85 mi) south-west of Sydney; 5 km (3 mi) east of Bowral; 67 km (42 mi) west of Wollongong
- LGA(s): Wingecarribee Shire
- Region: Southern Highlands
- State electorate(s): Wollondilly
- Federal division(s): Whitlam
Suburbs around East Bowral:
	Mittagong
Bowral	East Bowral	Glenquarry
	Burradoo

East Bowral is a gazetted locality and state suburb approximately 2 kilometres (1.2 mi) east of the town of Bowral of the Southern Highlands, New South Wales, Australia.

East Bowral is commonly regarded as an area corresponding with a development estate from Old South and Boardman roads in the north-west to Bong Bong Picnic Race Club in the south-east. However the suburb boundaries lie south of King Ranch and Highland drives. Hence, the gazetted suburb itself is south of the East Bowral Community Centre and the locally reputable Scottish Arms tavern.

At the 2011 census the residential population of East Bowral was reported as 1581. The 2006 population was reported as 2457 but this was for an area with very different boundaries.

== Attractions ==
The historic Bong Bong Picnic Race Club's 170-acre (0.69 km^{2}) horse racetrack Wyeera is in East Bowral. Wyeera is a professional and modern racetrack with a clubhouse and its famous hill, The Hill. The Bong Bong Race Cup is held every second Wednesday in November.

Wyeera has been used as a venue for various events including the Bowral Show, Opera in the Highlands, Bowral Garden and Flower Festival, Home & Garden Show Bowral, and Cinema Under the Stars.

East Bowral has parks and reserves throughout the suburb, one of which being the Hammock Hill Reserve or more commonly referred to as the "Wombat Track" due to the animal species population that inhabit the area.

Furthermore, the Highlands Football Club (Highlands FC) are based at the David Wood Playing Fields which are located within East Bowral.

In late 2013 the Southern Highlands Botanic Garden was officially opened in East Bowral. Once fully established, it will be a cool-climate garden showcasing a mix of exotic and native plants. An historic Skins Shed once stood on land adjacent to the botanic garden until the shed collapsed in 2006.

East Bowral is home to the Southern Highlands Christian School.
