= Bowral =

- Town
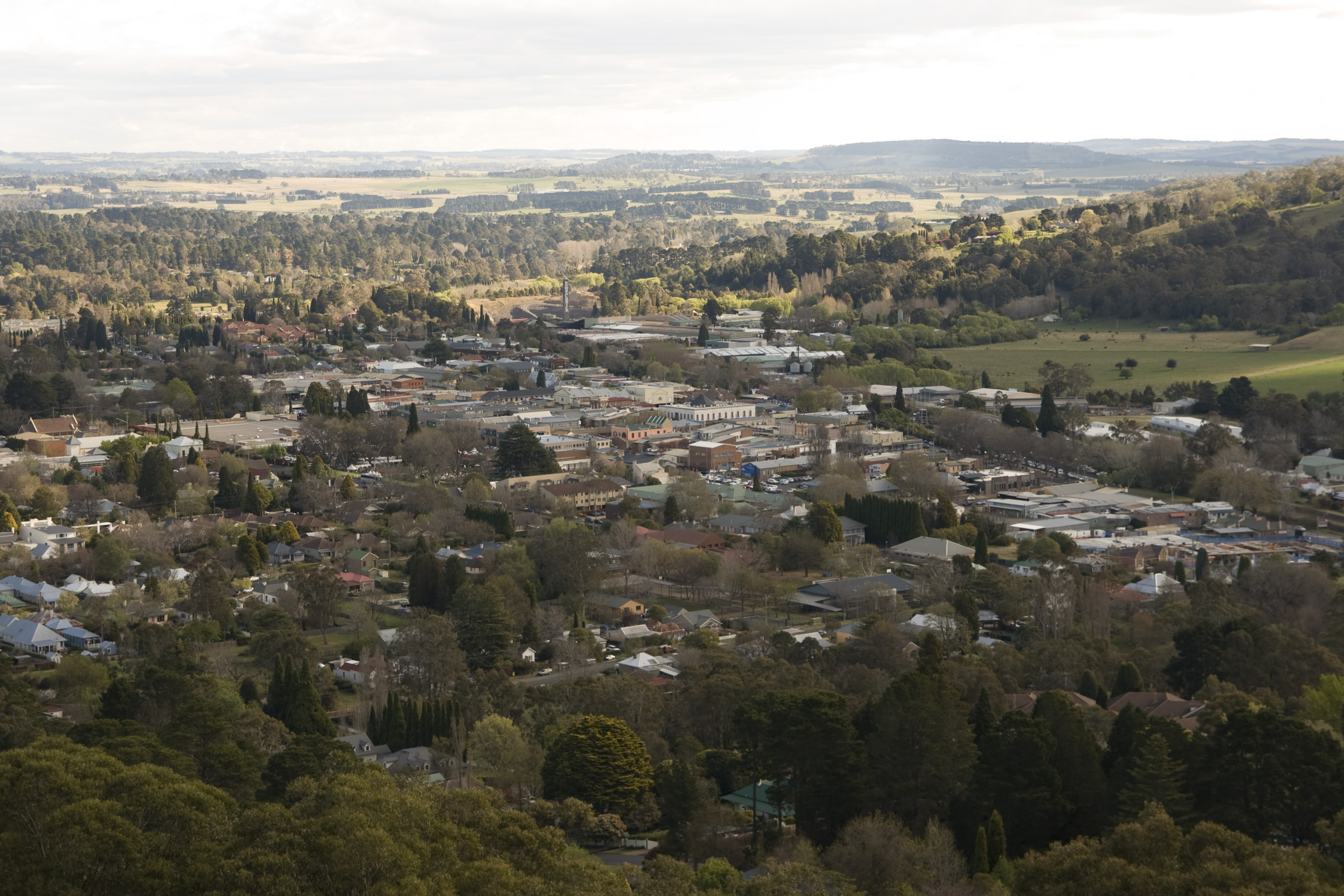
- Aerial view of Bowral

- Coordinates: 34°28′45″S 150°25′5″E
- Country: Australia
- State: New South Wales
- Region: Southern Highlands
- LGA: Wingecarribee Shire
- Location: 132 km (82 mi) SW of Sydney; 5 km (3.1 mi) SW of Mittagong; 169 km (105 mi) NE of Canberra; 73 km (45 mi) W of Wollongong; 79 km (49 mi) NE of Goulburn
- Established: 1861

Government
  - State electorate: Wollondilly
  - Federal division: Whitlam
- Elevation: 690 m (2,260 ft)

Population
  - Total: 10,764 (SAL 2021)
- Postcode: 2576
- County: Camden
- Parish: Mittagong
- Mean max temp: 18.7 °C (65.7 °F)
- Mean min temp: 7.9 °C (46.2 °F)
- Annual rainfall: 931.7 mm (36.68 in)
Localities around Bowral
	Mittagong
Berrima	Bowral	East Bowral
	Burradoo

Bowral (/ˈbaʊrəl/ BOW-rəl) is the largest town in the Southern Highlands of New South Wales, Australia. It is 132 kilometres (82 mi) south-west of Sydney and 169 kilometres (105 mi) north-east of Canberra. It is the main business and entertainment precinct of the Wingecarribee Shire and the Southern Highlands.

Bowral once served as a rural summer retreat for the gentry of Sydney, resulting in the establishment of a number of estates and manor houses in the district. Bowral is often associated with the cricketer Sir Donald Bradman.

Bowral is close to several other historic towns, being 5 kilometres (3 mi) from Mittagong, 9 kilometres (6 mi) from both Moss Vale and Berrima. The suburb of East Bowral and the village of Burradoo are nearby.

== History ==
The name Bowral is a word derived from the Ngunnawal–Gundungurra language which was used to describe the nearby Mount Gibraltar. A clan of the Gandangara people lived in the region before British colonisation.

Bowral's colonial history extends back for approximately 200 years. The first European arrival was ex-convict John Wilson, who was commissioned by Governor Hunter to explore south of the new colony of Sydney. Other people to traverse the area include John Warby and botanist George Caley (an associate of Joseph Banks), the Hume brothers and later famous pioneer explorers John Oxley and Charles Throsby. Governor Lachlan Macquarie of the New South Wales colony had appointed 2,400 acres (9.7 km^{2}) to John Oxley in a land grant, which was later incorporated as Bowral.

The town grew rapidly between the 1860s and the 1890s, mainly due to the building of the railway line from Sydney to Melbourne. In 1863, a permanent stone building was built for the church. However, the building would be replaced by the first Anglican church of St Simon and St Jude. The church was designed by Edmund Blacket and was built on the glebe in 1874. The church was expanded in 1887 to cater for a growing number of worshippers. Today, only Blackett's belltower remains. One of the earliest houses built as a mountain retreat was Craigieburn which was constructed in 1885.

Gardens and European plants flourished from 1887, when citizens of Bowral started planting deciduous trees to make the area look more reminiscent of Europe and the British. This legacy still lives on throughout Bowral. Notably, the oaks at the start of Bong Bong St are a characteristic that makes Bowral distinct from other rural towns, giving it strong autumn colour. The town became somewhat affluent, as many wealthy Sydney-siders purchased property or land in the town and built grand Victorian weatherboard homes.

== Heritage listings ==
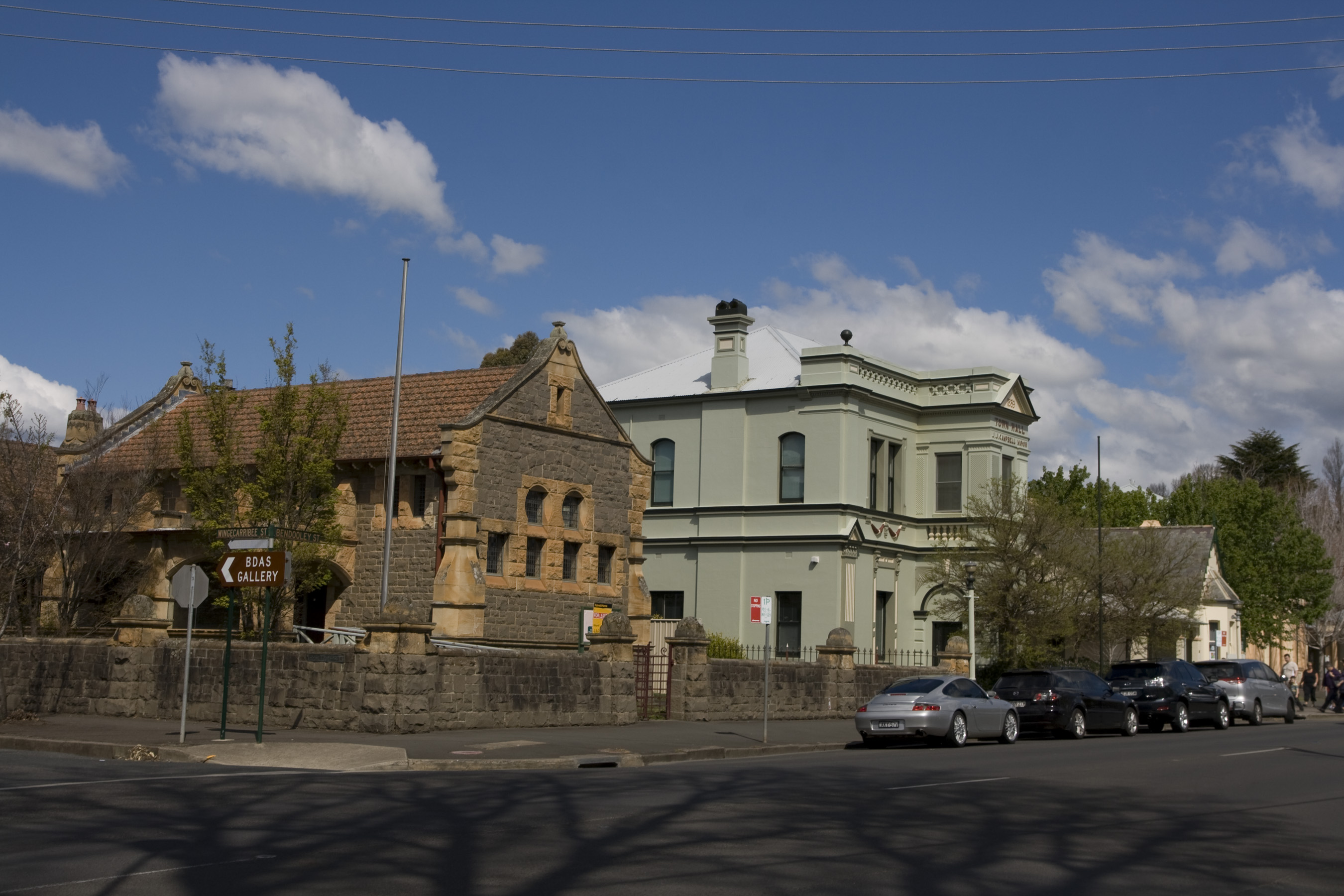
Heritage buildings in Bowral

Bowral has a number of heritage-listed sites, including:

- Evans Lane: Kurkulla
- Glebe Street: Bradman Oval
- Oxley Drive: Mount Gibraltar Trachyte Quarries Complex

== Etymology ==
Bowral, and the former spelling Bowrall, may have been derived from an Dharawal word bowrel meaning "high".

== Demographics ==
Historical population
Year	Pop.	±%
1921	2,620	—
1933	3,005	+14.7%
1947	3,660	+21.8%
1954	3,926	+7.3%
1961	4,922	+25.4%
1966	5,210	+5.9%
1971	5,903	+13.3%
1976	6,283	+6.4%
1981	6,862	+9.2%
1986	7,390	+7.7%
1991	7,929	+7.3%
1996	8,705	+9.8%
2001	10,325	+18.6%
2006	6,971	−32.5%
2011	8,022	+15.1%
2016	10,335	+28.8%
2021	10,764	+4.2%
Source: Australian Bureau of Statistics data. Note: after 2001, Bowral and Mittagong became merged as a single urban locality for statistical purposes, and the population above counts Bowral as a State suburb instead.

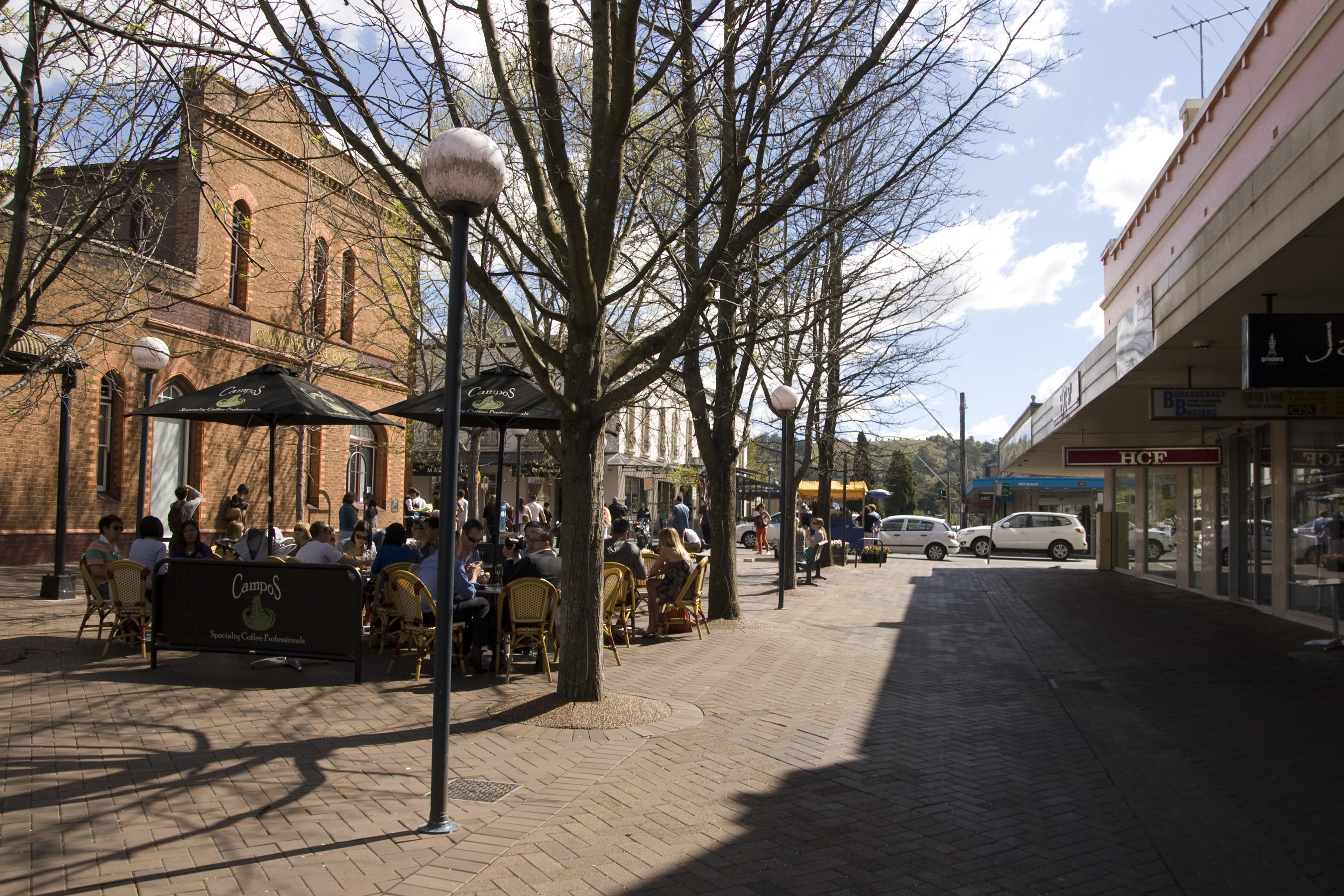
Bowral town centre

The 2021 census recorded Bowral's population as 10,764.

At the 2016 census, Bowral area, including Burradoo, had a population of 12,949. A more local area had a population of 10,335.

In 2021, 73.5% of people in Bowral were born in Australia. The next most common countries of birth were England 7.1% and New Zealand 1.8%. 88.0% of people spoke only English at home. Aboriginal and Torres Strait Islander people made up 1.0% of Bowral's population. The most common responses for religion in Bowral were No Religion 33.0%, Anglican 22.0%, and Catholic 21.2%.

In the 21st century, Bowral has become a haven for retirees and empty nesters, commonly from Sydney: 13.3% of Bowral's population is aged 55–64 years (compared with the national average of 11.8%) and 35.5% is aged over 64 years (compared with the national average of 15.8%). Consequently, the town has a number of retirement villages, some located only minutes' walk from the central business district and hospitals. Also, as measured during the 2021 census, 36.3% of the town's population are under the age of 45, whereas for the nation the figure is 58.1%.

== Transportation ==
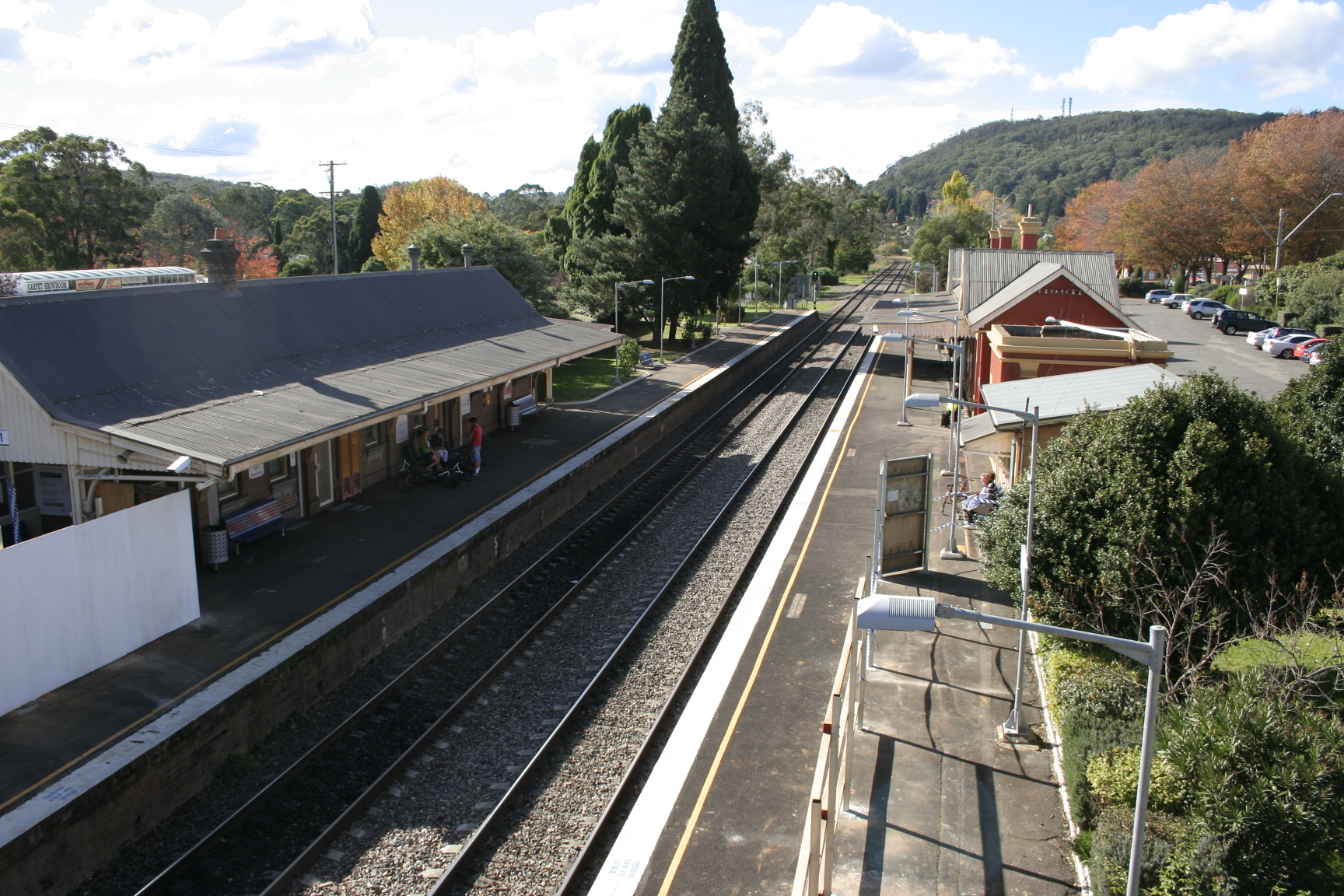
Bowral Railway Station

Bowral is about 5 kilometres (3 mi) from the Hume Highway, which goes north to Sydney and south to Canberra, the Snowy Mountains and Melbourne. In the past, Bowral served as an overnight stop-over for travellers. Bowral is situated on the B73 a route that runs from Mittagong through Bowral and onto Nowra

Bowral railway station is served by the Southern Highlands Line with services between Sydney and Moss Vale or Goulburn. Long-distance services operate to Canberra and Griffith.

It has public bus routes to Nowra, Albion Park and Wollongong. A private operator provides a service six days a week from Bowral to Greater Sydney (Campbelltown, Liverpool and Parramatta) and to the Shoalhaven and south coast of New South Wales.

== Climate ==
Bowral has an oceanic climate (Cfb), enjoying warm to mild, rainy summers and quite cool to cold winters with modest sunshine. Frost is common during winter and can even occur in summer. Snowfalls are rare, although falls in excess of 15 cm have been recorded. Historically maximum and minimum have ranged from 40.0 °C (104.0 °F) on 30 January 2003 to −11.2 °C (11.8 °F) on 11 July 1971.

Climate data for Bowral (Parry Drive, 1961–2015); 690 m AMSL; 34.49° S, 150.40° E
Month	Jan	Feb	Mar	Apr	May	Jun	Jul	Aug	Sep	Oct	Nov	Dec	Year
Record high °C (°F)	40.0 (104.0)	39.1 (102.4)	35.7 (96.3)	31.5 (88.7)	25.5 (77.9)	20.1 (68.2)	20.3 (68.5)	23.8 (74.8)	29.1 (84.4)	32.4 (90.3)	38.3 (100.9)	37.2 (99.0)	40.0 (104.0)
Mean daily maximum °C (°F)	25.5 (77.9)	24.4 (75.9)	22.4 (72.3)	19.3 (66.7)	15.4 (59.7)	12.4 (54.3)	11.6 (52.9)	13.4 (56.1)	16.3 (61.3)	19.0 (66.2)	21.4 (70.5)	23.8 (74.8)	18.7 (65.7)
Mean daily minimum °C (°F)	13.4 (56.1)	13.5 (56.3)	11.6 (52.9)	8.2 (46.8)	5.3 (41.5)	3.5 (38.3)	2.1 (35.8)	3.1 (37.6)	5.3 (41.5)	7.7 (45.9)	9.8 (49.6)	11.6 (52.9)	7.9 (46.3)
Record low °C (°F)	2.1 (35.8)	1.8 (35.2)	−0.7 (30.7)	−2.2 (28.0)	−6.3 (20.7)	−8.2 (17.2)	−11.2 (11.8)	−6.1 (21.0)	−5.7 (21.7)	−2.6 (27.3)	−2.2 (28.0)	−1.4 (29.5)	−11.2 (11.8)
Average precipitation mm (inches)	81.9 (3.22)	98.4 (3.87)	95.2 (3.75)	75.8 (2.98)	69.6 (2.74)	84.0 (3.31)	45.3 (1.78)	61.6 (2.43)	55.8 (2.20)	71.6 (2.82)	92.4 (3.64)	78.6 (3.09)	931.7 (36.68)
Average precipitation days	13.5	13.4	13.3	11.1	11.2	11.2	9.9	9.6	10.2	11.6	13.5	12.6	141.1
Average afternoon relative humidity (%)	57	64	61	61	65	67	64	56	54	56	60	56	60

== Tourist attractions ==
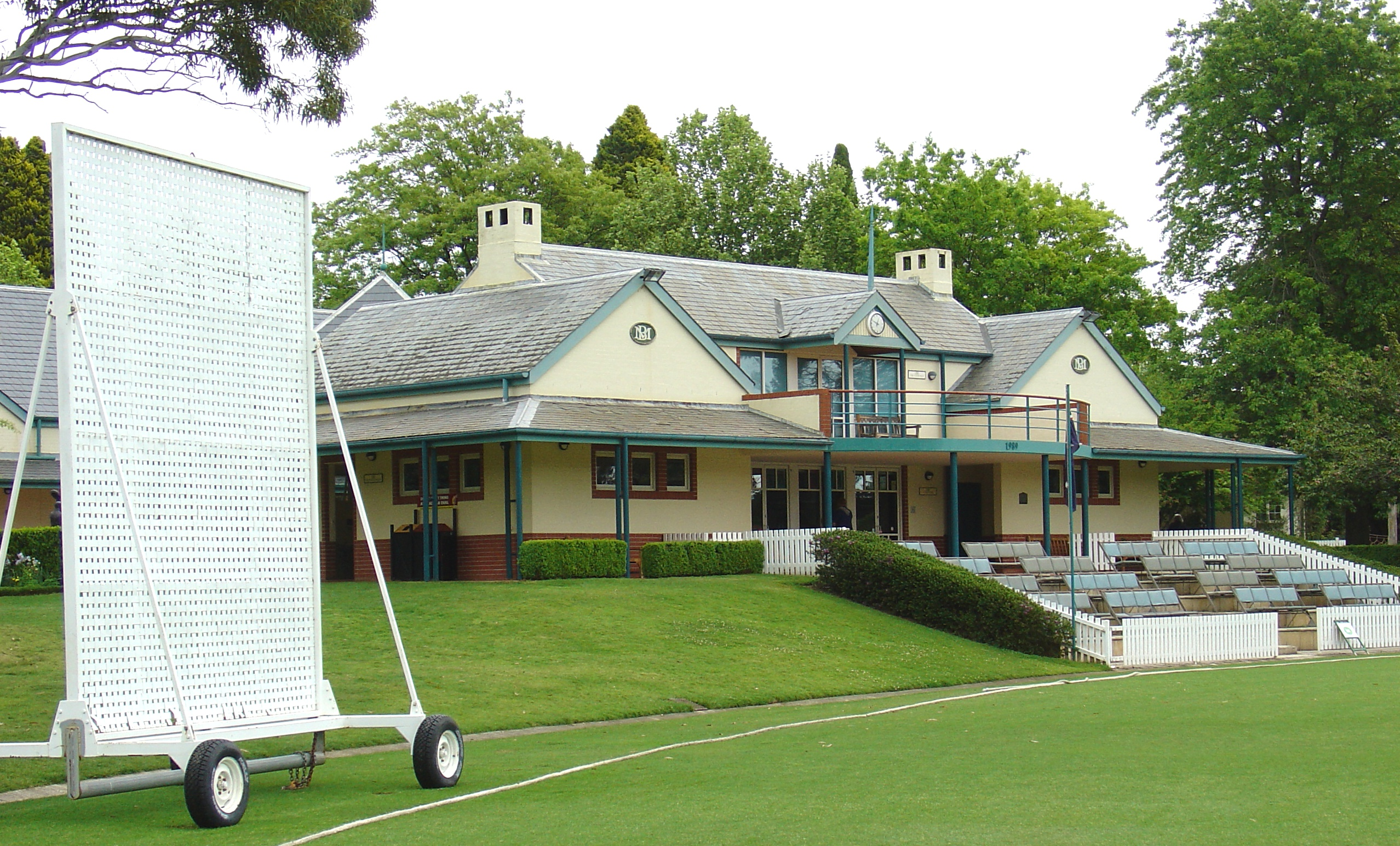
The Bradman Oval, pavilion and museum at Bowral, NSW

Bowral is noted for its boutiques, antique stores, gourmet restaurants and cafés.

The Bradman Oval, Bradman Museum and International Cricket Hall of Fame are dedicated to the achievements of cricketer Sir Donald Bradman and to the game of cricket.

Cecil Hoskins Nature Reserve, in the suburb's south, is a large picnic area known for its birdwatching.

The Bowral Honey Farm, located in the grounds of the historic National Trust property, Retford Park, offers a range of bee focused tours and experiences on weekends.

Bowral is the setting for Tulip Time at the Corbett Gardens, a springtime celebration with a profusion of tulips and other flowers planted in the town centre. A comprehensive private not-for-profit botanic garden includes a mix of exotic, native, and endemic species including a shale woodland, the endangered ecological community endemic to the site.

The town has a Vietnam War Memorial and Cherry Tree Walk, constructed along the Mittagong Rivulet that flows through the town. Along a walking/cycle track beside the stream are planted 526 cherry trees, each dedicated to a soldier who died in the service of his country.

Bowral and surrounding region was proclaimed a book town in 2000, having numerous bookshops and associations with many literary figures including P. L. Travers, the author of the Mary Poppins novels, Arthur Upfield, and many others.

First held in 2016, each spring, Bowral hosts a popular cycling event: "The Bowral Classic", which draws hundreds of participants to compete. There are multiple races ranging from 35 km to 160 km.

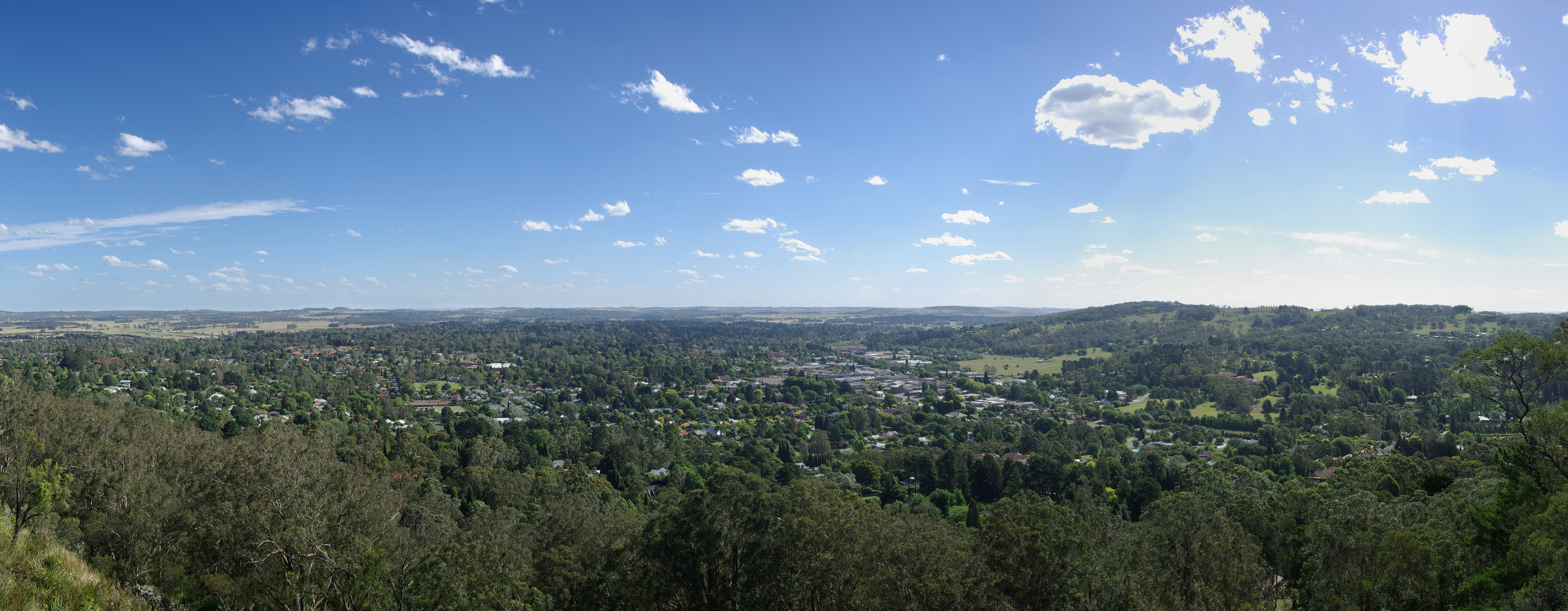
Panoramic view of Bowral from the Bowral Lookout on Mount Gibraltar. Moss Vale and the ranges near Bundanoon can be seen in the background.

The Bong Bong Picnic Races, commenced in 1886, attracted crowds of up to 35,000 but were suspended in 1985 and resumed in 1992 as a members-only event. The event attracts around 5,000 people and is held annually in November, as well as other events during the year.

Bowral is also home to a few vineyards and cellar doors and is close to Mittagong, the winery centre of the Southern Highlands. There are 60 vineyards in the Southern Highlands, which is a recognised cool-climate wine district. Wineries around Bowral are listed in the Southern Highlands Wineries Index.

Bowral is overshadowed by Mount Gibraltar, which rises to 863 metres (2,831 ft) above sea level and has lookouts over Bowral, Mittagong, Moss Vale and the ranges near Bundanoon.

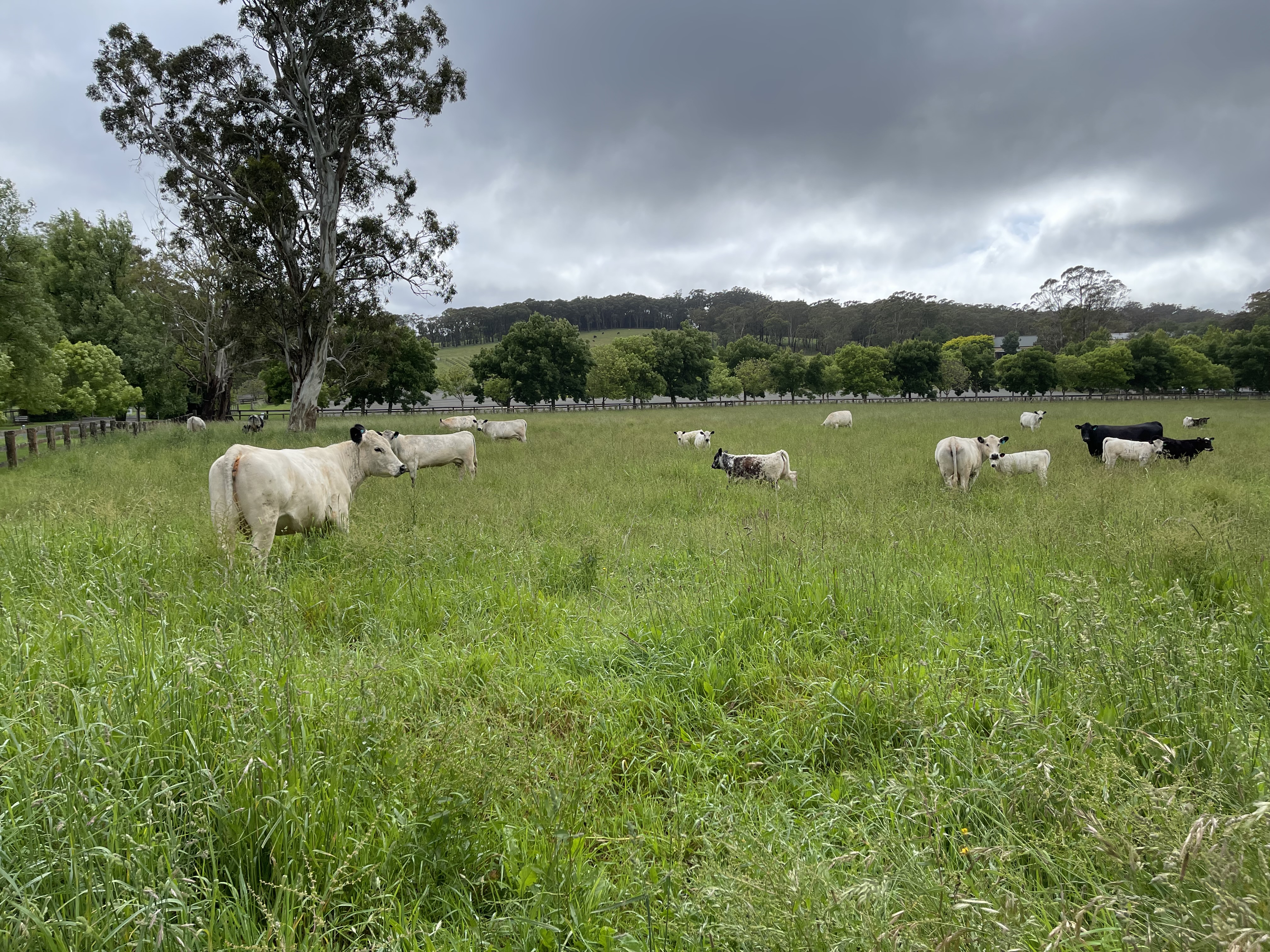
Bowral countryside

== Hospitals ==
The town is served by the Bowral and District Hospital, which also serves the Southern Highlands region. Founded in 1889, it is the only hospital operated outside the Sydney metropolitan area by the South Western Sydney Local Health District.

Bowral also has access to a private hospital operated by Ramsay Health Care, which includes short and long stay facilities although it lacks an emergency department.

== Schools ==
Schools in Bowral:

- Bowral High School
- Bowral Public School
- Chevalier College (Burradoo)
- Oxley College (Burradoo)
- Southern Highlands Christian School (East Bowral)
- St Thomas Aquinas Catholic Primary School

== Churches ==
Churches in Bowral:

- The Fields Church, an Acts 29 Network church
- St Simon's and St Jude's Anglican Church
- St Thomas Aquinas Roman Catholic Church
- St Andrew's Presbyterian Church
- Bowral Uniting Church
- Bowral First Church of Christ, Scientist
- Bowral Baptist Church
- Bowral Salvation Army
- Bowral Church of Christ
- Seventh-day Adventist Church

== Media ==
=== Television ===
Bowral receive five free-to-air television stations (television in Australia) including two government funded networks

The ABC, the SBS and three commercial networks:

- Seven
- Nine
- Network 10

ABC, SBS, Seven, Nine (WIN) and Network 10 all offer digital high-definition simulcasts of their main channels.

All five networks broadcast additional channels including: 7two, 7mate, 7flix, 9Go!, 9Gem, 9Life, ABC Family, ABC Entertains, ABC News, SBS2, SBS World Movies, SBS Food, 10 Drama, 10 Comedy and Nickelodeon.

=== Radio ===
Radio stations that broadcast to the town are:

- Highland FM (107.1 FM community)
- VOX FM (106.9 FM community)
- Wave FM (96.5 FM commercial)
- ABC Illawarra (97.3 FM ABC Local Radio that broadcast to the town)
- Triple J (98.9 FM),
- Radio National (1431 AM),
- ABC Classic (95.7 FM)
- Newsradio (90.9 FM)

=== Newspapers ===
The Southern Highland News is the town's local weekly newspaper.

== Notable residents ==
- Sir Edmund Barton: First Prime Minister of Australia
- Billy Birmingham: comedian, aka "The 12th Man"
- Sir Donald Bradman: Australian cricketer, the town's welcoming sign features a likeness of him getting ready to hit.
- Ita Buttrose: journalist, businesswoman, and Australian of the Year 2013
- Jennifer Byrne: journalist and former book publisher
- Richard Carleton: former 60 Minutes reporter. Born in Bowral
- Lauren Cheatle: Lives in Bowral. Fast Bowler for Australia women's cricket team, NSW Breakers and Sydney Sixers.
- Bryce Courtenay: South African novelist
- G. F. J. Dart: headmaster of Ballarat Grammar School 1942–1970
- Andrew Denton: television producer, comedian, television presenter and former radio host
- Frank Debenham: Antarctic scientist and geographer
- Roy De Maistre: painter, born Bowral 1894
- Lorrae Desmond: actress (A Country Practice). Born in Mittagong
- John Fahey: former NSW Premier, federal parliamentarian, president of the (sports) World Anti-Doping Agency
- Peter Garrett: former Gillard government minister and band member of Midnight Oil
- Scott Geddes: rugby league player
- Merv Hicks: Rugby league international
- Nathan Hindmarsh: Parramatta Eels captain NRL
- Geoff Jansz: television chef
- James Kemsley: cartoonist (Ginger Meggs)
- Graham Kennedy: "The King" of Australian television
- John Kerin: politician, former Treasurer of Australia. Born in Bowral
- Elspeth McLachlan: neuroscientist, born in Bowral
- Geoff Morrell: artist, actor Blue Heelers
- John Olsen: artist
- Paul Ramsay: businessman and philanthropist
- Craig Reucassel: television satirist, attended Bowral High School
- Leo Sayer: singer-songwriter
- Clement Semmler: author, reviewer and deputy general manager of the ABC
- Tim Storrier: artist, winner of the 2012 Archibald Prize
- P. L. Travers: author of Mary Poppins
- Arthur Upfield: author of the Boney detective novels
- Paul White: "The Jungle Doctor" medical missionary to Tanganyika, author
- Geordie Williamson: Mathematician specialising in representation theory
- Tim the Yowie Man, lived his formative years in Bowral from 1982 to 1990. Cryptonaturalist, author, tour guide, motivational speaker, TV personality, radio broadcaster.

== See also ==
- New Empire Cinema (Bowral)
