= Burradoo, New South Wales =

Burradoo
- Town
- Coordinates: 34°30′22.644″S 150°24′16.614″E
- Country: Australia
- State: New South Wales
- Region: Southern Highlands
- LGA: Wingecarribee Shire
- Location: 135 km (84 mi) SW of Sydney; 3 km (1.9 mi) S of Bowral; 7 km (4.3 mi) N of Moss Vale; 75 km (47 mi) NE of Goulburn
- Established: 1861

Government
  - State electorate: Wollondilly
  - Federal division: Whitlam
- Elevation: 685 m (2,247 ft)

Population
  - Total: 2,879 (SAL 2021)
- Postcode: 2576
- County: Camden
- Parish: Mittagong
Localities around Burradoo
	Bowral
Berrima	Burradoo	East Bowral
	Moss Vale

Burradoo (/ˈbʌrəduː/ BURR-ə-doo) is a suburb of Bowral, in the Southern Highlands of New South Wales, Australia, in Wingecarribee Shire.

The village of Burradoo is well known as an expensive area in the Southern Highlands (among other residential areas including Mount Gibraltar, Knotts Hill, Central Bowral, Kangaloon and East Kangaloon). This is because Burradoo is home to many historic manor houses and large modern architectural homes on small acreages. Often Burradoo is compared to parts of England largely reflected in the architecture & gardens.

Burradoo comes from an Aboriginal phrase meaning many brigalow trees.

== Schools ==
Burradoo is home to two independent, co-educational, secondary day schools:

- Oxley College is built on the estate of Elvo, the former home of Septimus Alfred Stephen and later of Arthur Wigram Allen, and had its 25th anniversary in 2008. The school now has a primary schooling facility.
- Chevalier College is built on the estate of Riversdale House, the former home of the descendants of Henry Osborne. It is a relatively rare example of the smaller scale domestic buildings of John Horbury Hunt in the Arts & Crafts style of Federation architecture and includes a house, ballroom and two chapels. While the school was originally a boys' boarding school in the 1970s, it has become a co-educational college including day students. In 2003 the boarding houses were shut and the college is now the largest in the Southern Highlands, and also the largest single employer in the Southern Highlands.

== Heritage listings ==
Burradoo has a number of heritage-listed sites, including:

- Yean Street: Yean Cottage, Anglewood Estate

== Population ==
At the 2016 census, Burradoo had a population of 2,645 people. At the 2021 census, there were 2,879.

== Notable residents ==
- Horatio Scott Carslaw (1870–1954) mathematician
- Ian Craig (1935–2014) cricketer
- Paul Ramsay (1936–2014) Businessman and philanthropist

== Railway ==
Burradoo railway station is a part of the Southern Highlands Line on the NSW TrainLink network.
