= Southern Highlands (New South Wales) =

Coordinates: 34°28′S 150°25′E

- Region
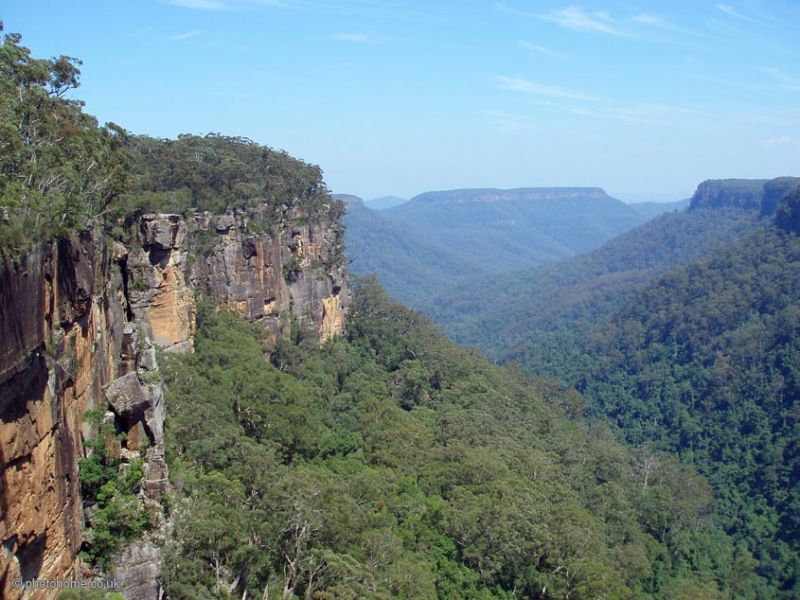
- Morton National Park at Fitzroy Falls
- Country: Australia
- State: New South Wales
- Region: Capital Country
- LGA: Wingecarribee Shire
- Location: 110 km (68 mi) South-West of Sydney; 140 km (87 mi) North-East of Canberra

Government
  - State electorate: • Goulburn • Kiama • Wollondilly
  - Federal division: • Hume • Gilmore • Whitlam

Population
  - Total: 52,678 (SA3 2021)
Regions around Southern Highlands
Southern Tablelands	Macarthur (Greater Sydney)	Illawarra
Southern Tablelands	Southern Highlands	Illawarra
Southern Tablelands	Southern Tablelands	South Coast

The Southern Highlands, also locally referred to as the Highlands, is a geographical region and district in New South Wales, Australia and is 110 km south-west of Sydney. The region comprises the local government area of the Wingecarribee Shire and also towns of the Mulwaree Shire. The region is considered a wine region.

The region specifically is the area centred on the commercial towns of Mittagong, Bowral, Moss Vale, Bundanoon and Robertson as well as the historic town of Berrima. Smaller villages like Burradoo, Sutton Forest, Colo Vale, Avoca, Yerrinbool, Exeter, Welby and many more that make up the Wingecarribee Shire are spread in between and around these main centres and serve mostly as residential areas.

The Highlands geographically sits between 500 m and 900 m above sea level on the Great Dividing Range. Like other regions along this plateau such as the Blue Mountains to the north and the Australian Alps to the south, the Southern Highlands is known for its cool temperate climate. The Southern Highlands Shale Forest and Woodland and Blue Mountains and Southern Highlands Basalt Forests vegetation communities lie primarily within the region.

The Southern Highlands as a region is part of the larger Capital Country Region with the Highlands forming the northern part of the region and the Southern Tablelands forming the southern part of the region.

== Demographics ==
The Southern Highland's council, Wingecarribee Shire, is home to about 44,379 (2006) residents and is growing at a rate of 2.1% per annum. The majority of the residents (84.5%) are Australian-born with the minority of the population being (15%) born overseas, primarily Europe. The population density of the Highlands is 16.5 persons/km^{2}.

== Local attractions ==
=== Berrima ===
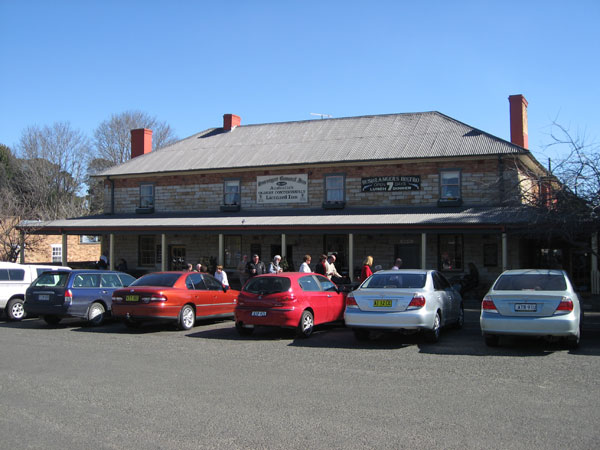
Berrima's Surveyor General Inn that was established in 1834.

Berrima is a village located 10 kilometres (6.2 mi) west of Bowral and 14 kilometres (8.7 mi) south west of Mittagong that once served as the main town of the Highlands. Notably, the region of Bowral, Mittagong and Berrima and various villages including the Northern Villages used to be known as the Berrima District. Berrima contains many historic buildings including the historical Berrima Gaol and Courthouse which is no longer in use today as well as many other historical buildings.

=== Bowral town centre ===
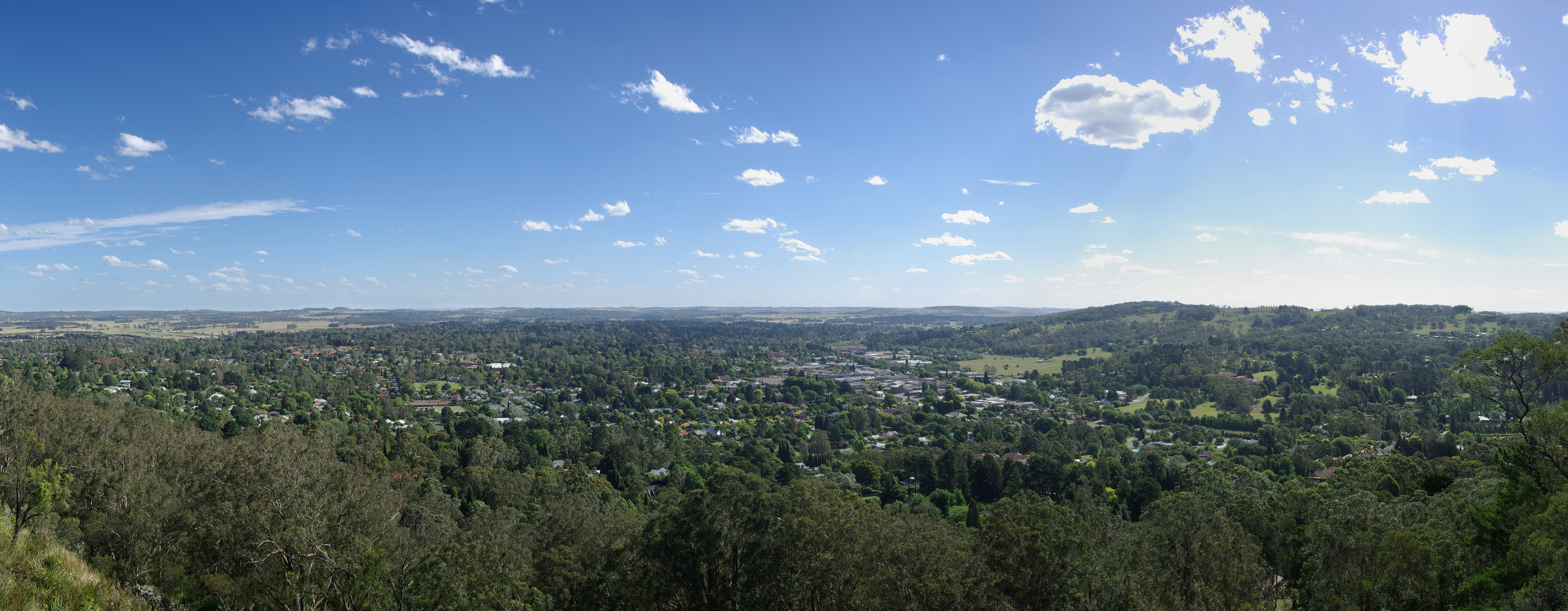
Bowral

Bowral is considered the commercial centre of the Highlands and may be the most well-known towns of the Highlands. Bowral is well known for its boutiques, gourmet restaurants, Corbett Gardens and Springetts Arcade. The town is also home to the Sir Donald Bradman or Bradman Museum.

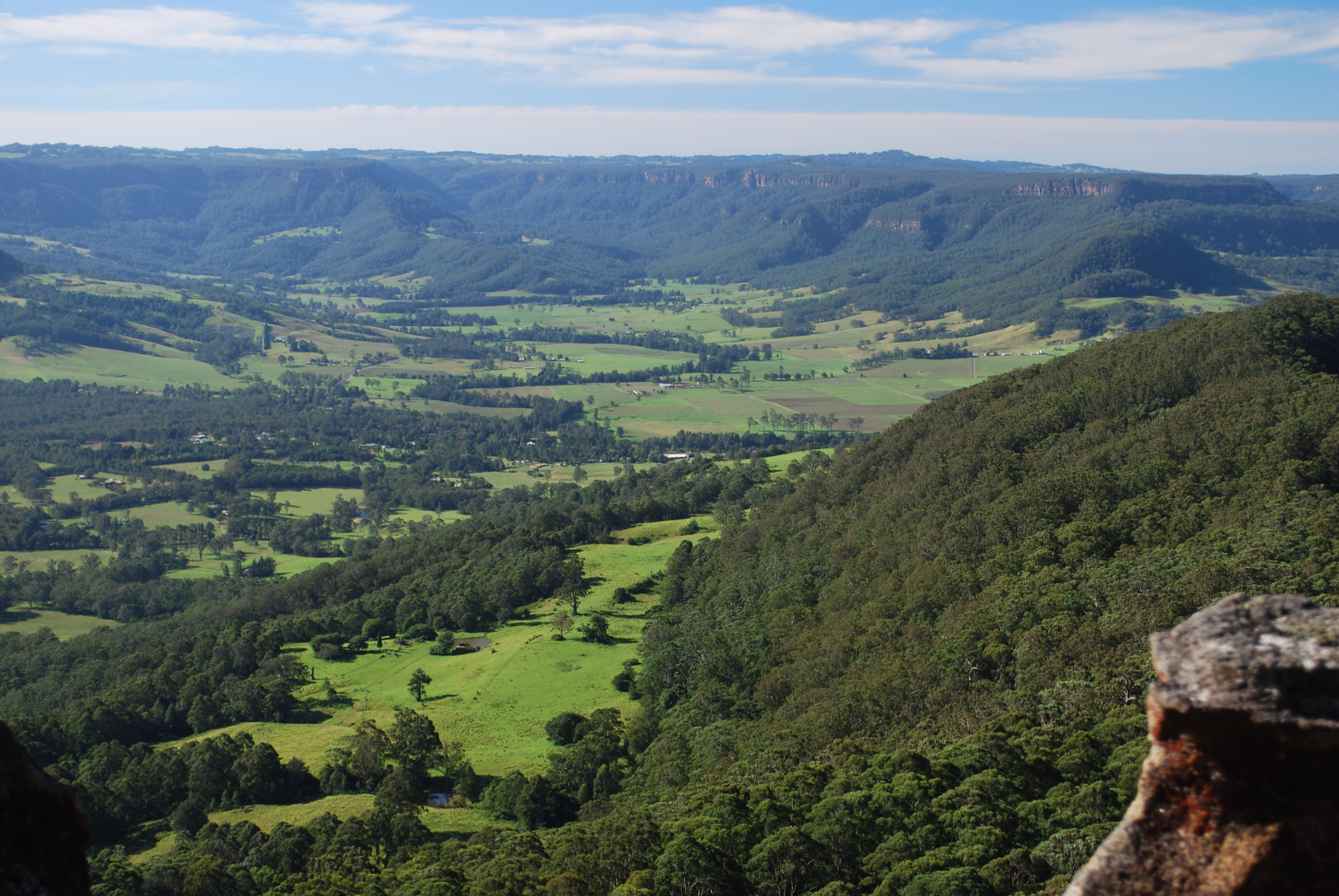
Kangaroo Valley

=== Bradman Museum, Bowral ===
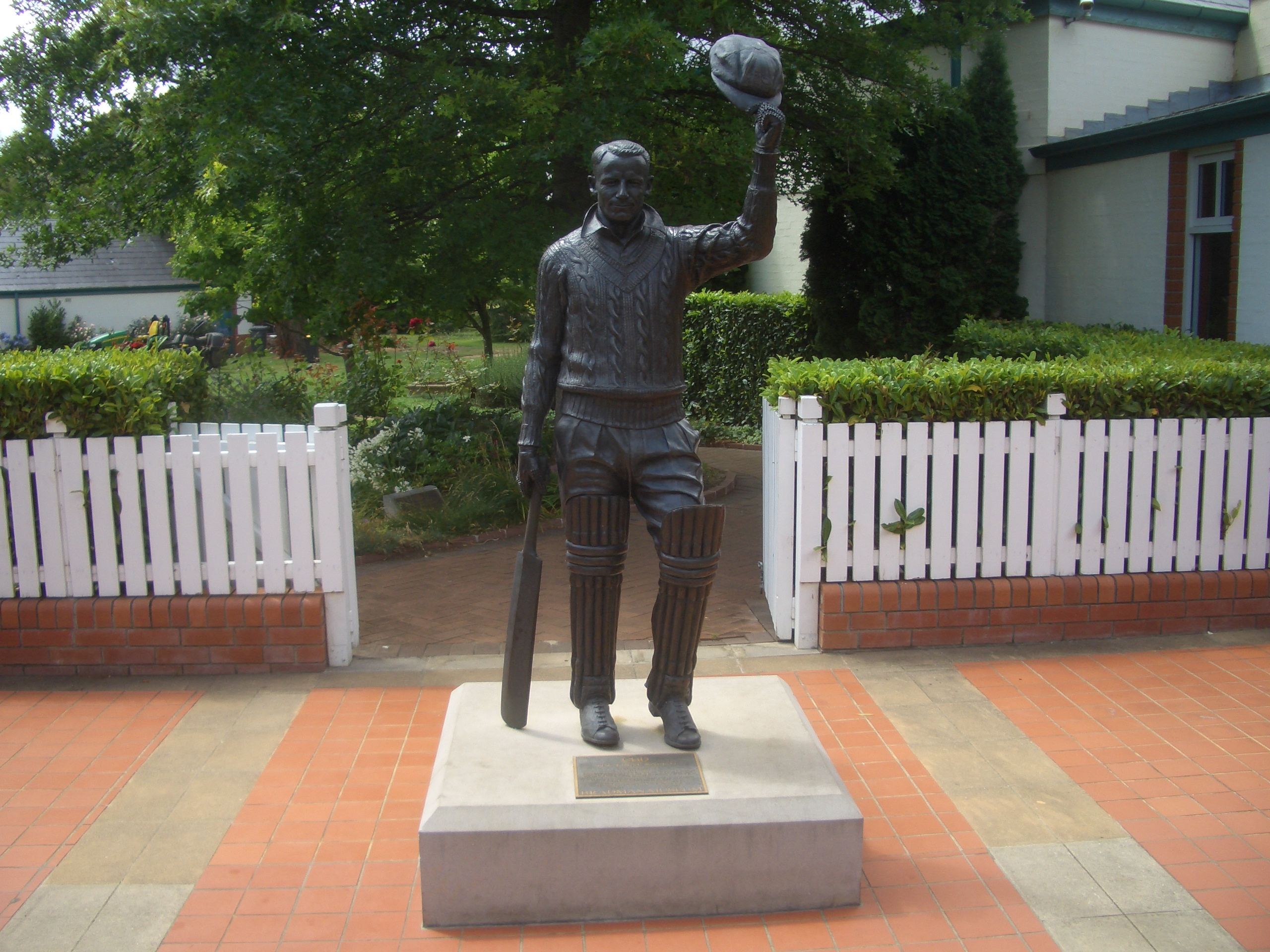
The statue of Sir Donald Bradman outside the Bradman Museum.

The Bradman Museum is a tribute museum to Australian cricketer Sir Donald Bradman who grew up in and spent his early life in Bowral until his fame. The museum contains artifacts of Bradman's life and also serves as a museum of cricket and contains historical cricket memorabilia. The museum is located adjacent to Bradman Oval where the Australian Cricket Team play a friendly game annually.

=== Fitzroy Falls ===
Fitzroy Falls is a waterfall found in the Morton National Park near the Highlands' village of the same name, Fitzroy Falls, and located near Kangaroo Valley. The Fitzroy Falls reserve offers lookouts of the waterfall and of panoramic views of the Morton National Park. The waterfall and village is located near the lake Fitzroy Reservoir. The waterfall's and lake's reserve includes lookouts, bushwalking trails and picnic areas.

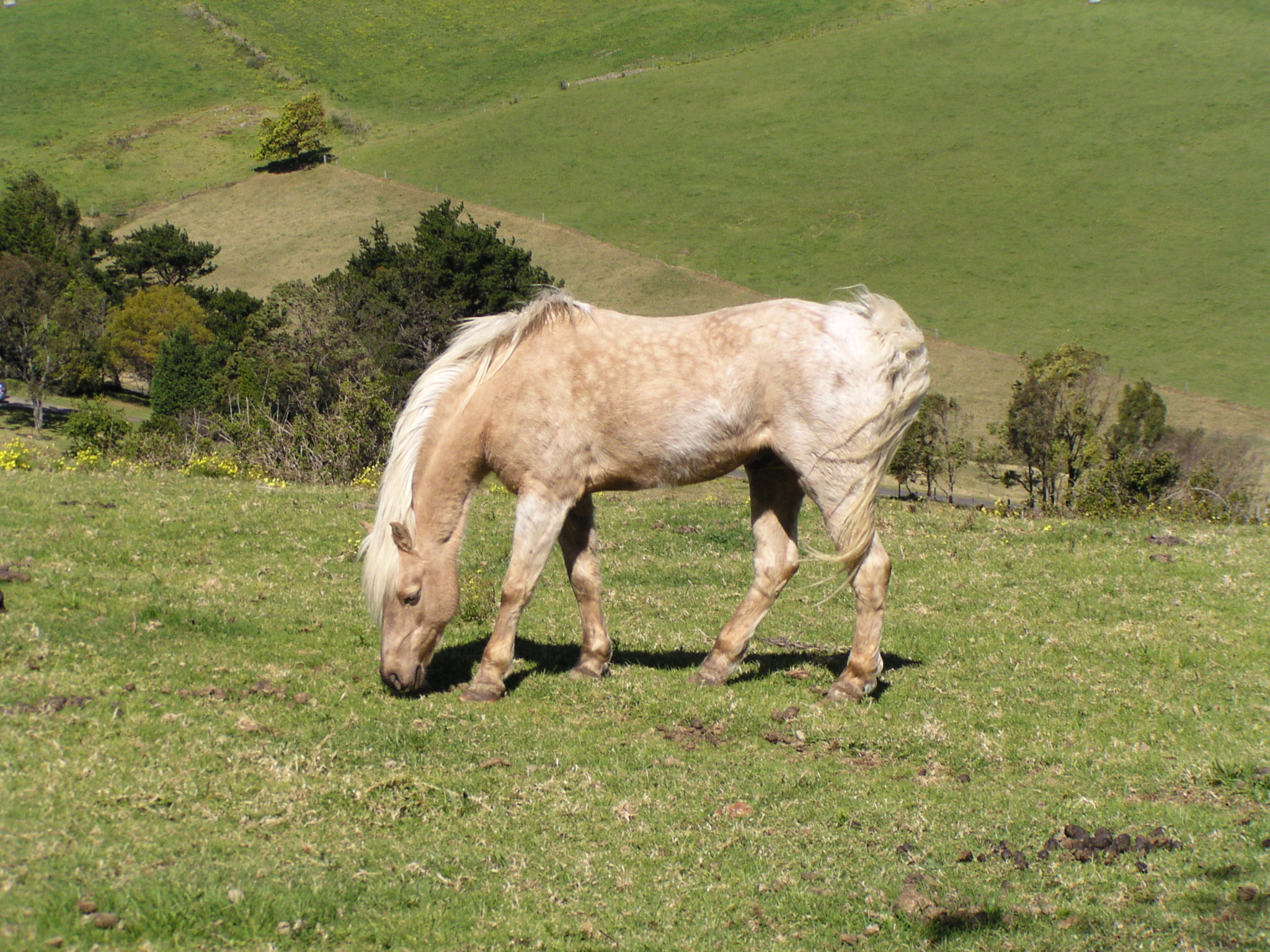
Grazing near Jamberoo

=== Illawarra Fly Tree Top Walk, Robertson ===
The Illawarra Fly Tree Top Walk, also known as Illawarra Fly, is a canopy walkway located south-east of Robertson in the area known as Knights Hill. The facility is a 500m long and 25m high walk facility that opened in mid-2008. The project is similar to the Otway Fly Tree Top Walk in Victoria, Australia. The project consists of a 1500m walk. Moreover, 500m of the 1500m walk is 25m high among the Blackwoods and many other trees of the temperate rainforest of the Budderoo National Park and Illawarra Escarpment. In addition, the project has a 45m high lookout along with the walk that offers panoramic views far south to Bass Point and as far as north to Bundeena which is part of south of the Sutherland Shire. Other views include Wollongong, Lake Illawarra, Tasman Sea, Shellharbour, Kiama and other localities of the South Coast, as well as various localities of the Southern Highlands, the Illawarra Escarpment and Budderoo National Park.

=== Joadja ===
Joadja is a historic abandoned ghost town about 32 km west of Mittagong. The town was established in the 1870s by the Australian Kerosene Oil and Mineral Company as Joadja valley's walls contained a vast reserve of shale. Notably, the town back in its time was one of the most populous towns in the Highlands. However, at the turn of the century when the shale ran out, the town's population began to dwindle and the town would be eventually abandoned by the early 1900s.

Joadja at its height had a post office, theatre, general store, bakery, school of arts, refinery, railway line, miner's cottages and many other buildings. Notably, it was one of the first rural towns in New South Wales to be connected to the telephone.

Joadja's legacy still remains with many of the historical buildings remaining in ruin such as some of the miners' cottages, a school house, church, cemetery and refinery devices such as shale ovens. These ovens are protected and is World Heritage listed.

Today, the Joadja Distillery produces Single Malt Whisky in honour of the Scottish mining families who worked the rich coal and shale seams in the late 1800s.

=== Manor houses ===
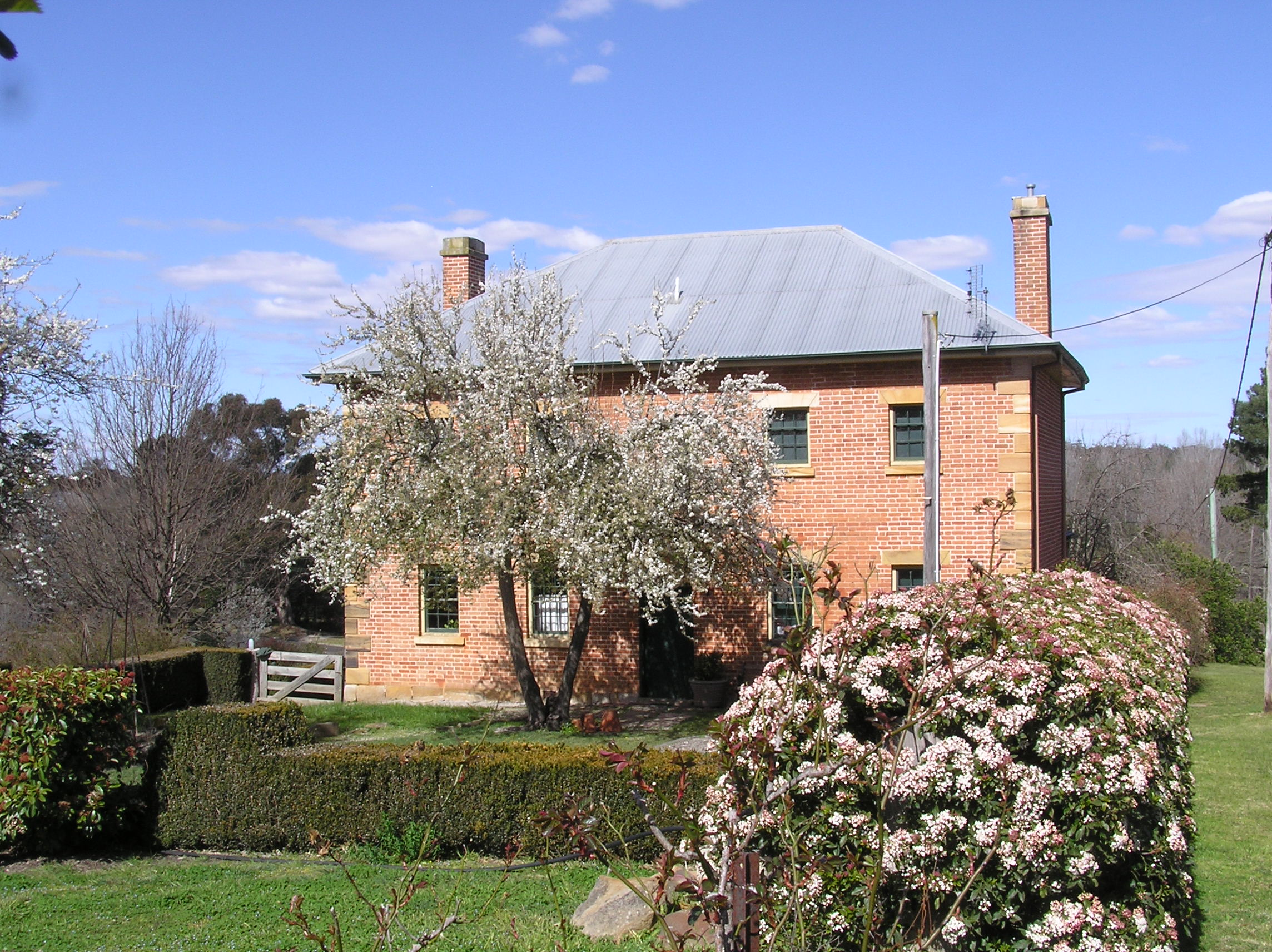
Harper's Mansion

The Southern Highlands has a reputation of being an upscale area due to its upscale-style accommodation which include reputable resorts such as Craigieburn, Briars, Berida Manor House and Peppers Manor House. Each of these places are historical and have a historic significance to the local area.

=== Robertson ===
Home of the Big Potato and Fountaindale Grand Manor "AKA" Ranelagh House. Fountaindale Grand Manor, originally built in 1924 and opened as Hotel Robertson, has had an interesting history. The Hotel boasted a nine-hole golf course, two tennis courts, croquet, lawn bowls, billiards, fishing, hunting, horseback riding, and an onsite mechanic who looked after guest's cars during their stay. The hotel won the "Most luxurious hotel in the Commonwealth" award in 1925, and was the first hotel in Australia to have phone lines to every room.

=== Wineries ===
The Highlands in the last decade has become a small yet significantly growing wine and cellar door region in New South Wales (NSW). It is believed that temperate climate, high annual rainfall as well as quality basalt soil makes it an ideal place for viticulture. There are many established wineries and vineyards that are located in the Highlands such as Joadja Estate, Bendooley Estate, Centennial Winery, St Maur Wines, Southern Highland Wines, and Eling Forest Winery. Some of these wineries have won awards nationally as well as internationally for the quality of their wines.

Varieties primarily cultivated in the region are; chardonnay, riesling, sauvignon blanc, pinot noir and cabernet sauvignon.

== Events ==
=== Brigadoon ===
Brigadoon is a cultural Scottish Festival that occurs one day in April at Bundanoon every year. The festival celebrates Highland Scottish culture where Bundanoon becomes the fictional Scottish town of Brigadoon. Festivities of the day include; massive band parades playing various Scottish instruments such as bagpipes; Scottish dancing such as Highland dancing and Scottish country dance; and Highland games such as caber toss and stone put. In addition, Scottish cuisine is available during the festival such as Scotch pie and haggis.

=== Tulip Time in Bowral ===
Tulip Time is a historical flower festival in Bowral where nearly 100,000 tulips that are planted in Bowral's Corbett Gardens bloom into flowers in late September and early October. The first festival was started in 1961 by the Rotary Club of Bowral-Mittagong. The festival usually lasts 14 days and includes various activities such as band parades, house and garden fairs, food and wine fairs and many other activities.

The festival donates proceeds to various charities and this year will be sponsoring Westmead Children's Hospital. In the past, the festival has supported local churches, hospitals, youth centres, elderly centres and disadvantaged people of the community.

=== Walk Through Bethlehem in Mittagong ===
Walk Through Bethlehem is an interactive Christmas experience for all ages. Visitors are invited to step back in time, into a reenactment of Bethlehem at the time of Jesus' birth. There they meet shepherds minding their flocks, potters, carpenters, stonemasons and copper-smiths at work, the wise men searching for the saviour, villagers selling their wares in the marketplace, before finally seeing Mary, Joseph and baby Jesus in the stable. Run by Mittagong Anglican Church (St. Stephen's), the event is held every second year in December, usually the week before Christmas. Held in the grounds of Mittagong Anglican Church on Main Street, the event has been run in 2008, 2009, 2011, 2013 and 2015.

== Local media ==
=== Newspapers ===
- The Southern Highland News · The local tri-weekly newspaper based in Bowral. It was first established in 1958. It is owned by Fairfax's Rural Press. It caters for the entire Wingecarribee Shire.
- The Highlands Post · The free local advertising newspaper owned and run by Southern Highland News. It is delivered to all villages and towns of the entire Wingecarribee Shire.

=== Radio ===
- ABC Illawarra broadcast to the region from Wollongong on 97.3 FM, part of ABC Local Radio
- 2ST Radio · 102.9 FM. · A commercial radio station that is based in Bowral and Nowra.
- 92.5 FM Youth Radio (previously 2WYR925FM) · 92.5 FM. · The local community youth radio station that is based in Bowral.
- Highland FM (previously 2WKT Radio) · 107.1 FM. · The local FM community radio station that is based in Bowral.
- Classic Gold FM · 88.0 FM. · A local FM radio station playing music from the 1950s, 1960s and 1970s.

== Notable people ==
- Jono Brauer, Australian alpine skier who specialises in slalom and giant slalom
- Ann Carr-Boyd, Australian classical composer
- David Griffin, Australian lawyer and businessman, and former Lord Mayor of Sydney
- Jonathan Hardy, New Zealand-born Australian actor, writer and director
- Frank Tidswell, Australian physician
- Leo Sayer, English-Australian singer-songwriter
- Nicole Kidman, Australian-American actress, producer and singer.
- Nathan Hindmarsh, Australian rugby league player
- Feiz Mohammad, Australian radical preacher of Lebanese descent.

== See also ==
- Wingecarribee Shire
- History of Bowral
