= Bell's Life in London =

British newspaper

Newspaper article from Bell's Life in London describing a meeting of the Football Association held in 1863.

Bell's Life in London, and Sporting Chronicle was a British weekly sporting paper published as a pink broadsheet between 1822 and 1886.

== History ==
Bell's Life was founded by Robert Bell, a London printer-publisher. Bell sold it to William Innell Clement, owner of The Observer, in 1824 or 1825, and the paper swallowed up a competitor, Pierce Egan's Life in London and Sporting Guide.

Circulation in 1837 averaged 16,400 per issue and had risen to 29,200 by 1845.

From 1824 to 1852 it was edited by Vincent George Dowling, "during which time Bell's Life became Britain's leading sporting newspaper, without which no gentleman's Sunday was quite complete". Dowling's son, Frank Lewis Dowling, effectively edited the paper during the last year of his father's life, and succeeded him as editor from 1852 to 1867. By the 1860s Bell's Life was facing competition from The Field, The Sportsman, Sporting Life, and The Sporting Times. In 1885 Edward Hulton bought Bell's Life and made it a daily, but in 1886 it was absorbed by Sporting Life.

== Editorial policy ==
Though Bell's Life is now best known as a racing paper, it began life as an anti-establishment general newspaper aimed at the working class. From around 1830, it provided increasing coverage to racing. Soon it comprised more than a third of the paper, following general news and other sporting news (notably boxing). For 30 years, it remained the principal source of racing news while its general news with its acid comment, full coverage of scandal and cartoons provides an entertaining picture of Victorian Britain. Bell's problem was that it aimed at both the literate poor and the general sporting public who fall into all classes. It experimented variously with appearing more than once a week and eventually eliminated all its general news, covering sport alone; but the changes came too late.

== Contributors ==
Contributors included:

- Francis Frederick Brandt
- agricultural writer Henry Corbet (1820–78)
- Charles Dickens
- Henry Hall Dixon
- angling writer Edward Fitzgibbon (1803–57)
- cricket writer Frederick Gale (1823–1904)
- W. H. Leverell
- card games writer Henry Jones (1831–1899)
- William Russell Macdonald (1787–1854)
- Rev. Charles Henry Newmarch (1824–1903)
- sports writer William Ruff (1801–56)
- Robert Smith Surtees
- chess writer George Walker (1803–79)
- John Henry Walsh
- Joseph Osborne "Beacon" author of The Horsebreeder's Handbook, owner/trainer of Grand National winner 1850/51
