= John Lynch (serial killer) =

Australian serial killer

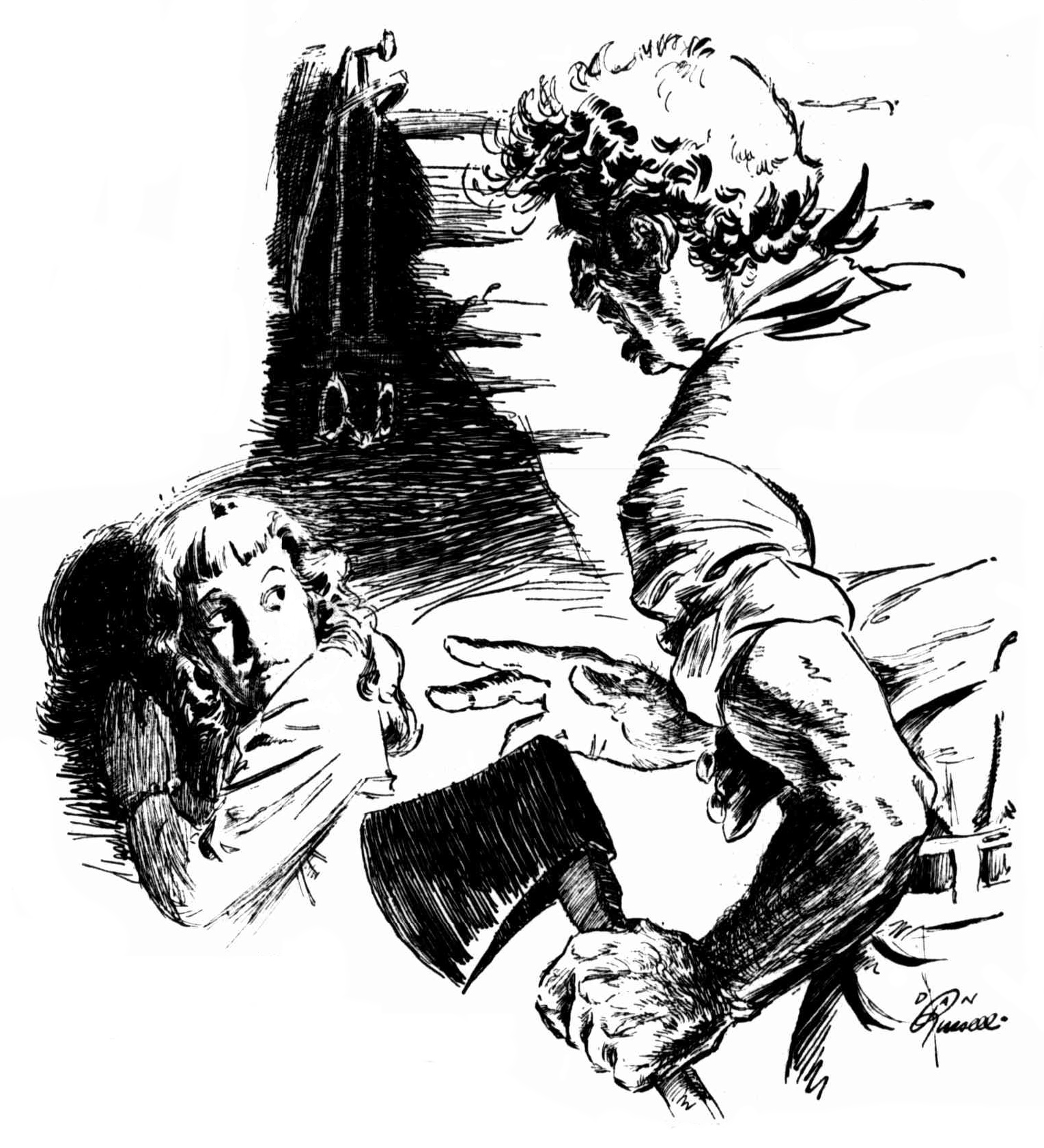
- An artist's impression of the imminent murder of Mary Macnamara by John Lynch in August 1841 at Wombat Brush, near Berrima [published in the Truth newspaper (Sydney), 16 October 1949].
- Born: c. 1812; Cavan, County Cavan, Ireland
- Died: 22 April 1842 (aged 28); Berrima, New South Wales, Australia
- Cause of death: Execution by hanging
- Other name: John Dunleavy
- Conviction: Murder
- Penalty: Death

Details
- Victims: 10
- Span of crimes: 1836–1841
- Country: Australia
- State: New South Wales
- Date apprehended: 25 February 1842

John Lynch (c. 1812 – 22 April 1842) was an Irish-born Australian serial killer who confessed to the killing of ten people between 1836 and 1842. He is possibly the most prolific individual serial killer in Australian history. Lynch arrived in Australia as a convict, assigned to a farm in the Berrima district. He murdered a fellow assigned convict in 1836 but was acquitted of the charge. After a period in a convict gang he absconded, and by July 1841 he had made his way back to the Berrima district. On two occasions Lynch murdered carriers along the road between Berrima and Camden, stealing their drays and teams. In the latter half of 1841 Lynch murdered the farmer John Mulligan and his family, and took possession of their farm in the Berrima district using the name John Dunleavy. He was convicted in March 1842 of the murder of Kearns Landregan, sentenced to death and executed by hanging in April 1842.

== Early life and transportation ==
John Lynch was born in about 1812 in Cavan, county Cavan, Ireland, the son of Owen Lynch.

Lynch's older brother Patrick was tried and convicted at Cavan in July 1831 for sheep-stealing, sentenced to transportation for life. He was transported to Sydney aboard the Captain Cook, arriving in April 1832.

John Lynch and his father Owen were both tried and convicted at Cavan in October 1831. John Lynch, aged 19 years, was convicted of “obtaining goods under false pretences”, for which he received a life sentence; his father, a widower aged 55 years, was convicted of “having stolen goods in possession”, receiving a sentence of transportation for seven years. Lynch and his father were transported to the colony of New South Wales aboard the Dunvegan Castle, which departed from Dublin on 1 July 1832 and arrived at Sydney on 16 October. Upon their arrival John Lynch, recorded as a ploughman, was assigned to James Atkinson at 'Oldbury Farm' in the Bong Bong district near Berrima. Owen Lynch was assigned to Richard Brownlow, a publican of Sydney.

Lynch's father, Owen Lynch, died on 26 February 1834 in the Gaol Hospital at Sydney, aged about 58 years.

== The murders ==
=== The 'Oldbury Farm' murder ===
In about January 1836 George Barton, the overseer of ‘Oldbury Farm’, was waylaid on a district road "by ruffians, supposed to be bushrangers", who robbed him, tied him to a fence and whipped him. It was suspected that the perpetrators were a gang of bushrangers operating in the area led by John Wales (alias Watt). In mid-February 1836 Watt was captured, along with another gang member Timothy Pickering, after a shoot-out with the police on the Cowpasture River, during which a third gang member (John Carpenter) was killed. In early May Watt and Pickering were tried for an armed robbery committed previous to their apprehension, found guilty and sentenced to hang. The sentence was carried out eight days later when both men were hanged. The status of George Barton, the overseer, changed in February 1836 when he became the master of ‘Oldbury Farm’ after marrying Charlotte Atkinson, widow of James Atkinson (who had died in April 1834).

On Friday, 12 August 1836, two of Barton's assigned convicts, John Lynch and John Williamson, were tried in the Sydney Supreme Court before Justice Burton for the “wilful murder” of Thomas Smith (or Smyth), another of Barton's assigned servants. Smith had been murdered on 4 March 1836; his body was discovered after several days in the hollow of a fallen tree about a mile from the convict huts at ‘Oldbury Farm’. Two heavy pieces of wood “clotted with blood and human hair” were found nearby. Barton's overseer gave evidence that, prior to his murder, Smith had been held in the Bong Bong watch-house in order to be examined by the district magistrates on a charge of having lost or stolen a saddle and bridle belonging to his master. The overseer had turned up at several court days in order to prosecute the case but on each occasion the magistrates failed to attend, after which it was decided to release Smith, in consideration of the punishment he had already undergone and the inconvenience of the loss of his services. Smith returned to his hut after his release and was found to be missing the next morning, with his body being discovered several days later.

The case against Lynch and Williamson rested primarily on the testimony of Michael Hoy, another convict at ‘Oldbury Farm’, who lived in the same hut as Smith, Lynch and Williamson. Hoy claimed that Lynch and Williamson had lured Smith from the hut the evening of his disappearance. Hoy maintained the motive for the murder was a suspicion that Smith had provided information that Lynch was one of those involved in the previous robbery and assault of Barton (this being the purported reason Smith was released). After the discovery of Smith's body, Hoy asserted he had had a conversation with Lynch, in the presence of Williamson, when Lynch was supposed to have said “that the master had come to the knowledge that he (Lynch) was one of the men that assisted Watts to flog him about three months before, which he could not have done if Smith had not told him something about it, and therefore he was glad he (Lynch) had put him out of the way”. When Hoy was cross-examined by the prisoners it was elicited that as a consequence of "some dealing in cattle" between Hoy and Smith, Hoy himself may have had reason to murder Smith. At the very least Hoy's testimony was significantly discredited. Barton, the master, was called to the stand, but his evidence "was rejected in consequence of his appearing 'to have dined'". As well as dismissing his evidence, Justice Burton fined Barton £50 for coming into the witness-box in a drunken state. In summing up the judge explained to the jury that, with the absence of corroborative evidence, the case rested solely on the credibility of the witness Hoy, which he considered to be “a person tainted with crime, and therefore liable to suspicion”. The jury returned a verdict of not guilty for both men. Six years later, on the day before he was to hang, Lynch confessed to Smith's murder.

At the conclusion of the trial the Crown Solicitor claimed that other charges were pending, and Lynch and Williamson were remanded until further information could be filed against them. Both men were sent to Hyde Park Barracks “to be disposed of there”, with the Attorney General suggesting they should be sent to the Bong Bong magistrates “to be dealt with summarily for certain acts of misconduct”.

=== Convict gang ===
The period of John Lynch's life between the August 1836 trial and his reappearance in the Berrima district in the second half of 1841 was summarised by the Berrima correspondent to the Sydney Herald after the murderer's arrest in February 1842: "He has been a long time in irons in different parts, and he is now a runaway". For at least part of that time Lynch was part of a convict stockade gang in Newcastle. On the night of 27 June 1839 at Newcastle, Lynch received a stab wound after being attacked (as he claimed) by three other inmates of his hut. According to a story he concocted, he was attacked by Thomas Barry, Thomas Bolson and Charles Wilson in retribution for a complaint he had made about the three men making straw hats and bartering them to the stockade cook in exchange for extra rations. Lynch maintained he was sleeping when the three covered his head with a blanket, and Bolson and Wilson held him while Barry stabbed him in the chest and side. The three convicts were convicted in August 1839 in the Supreme Court in Sydney and sentenced to death. In September 1839 the sentences of death passed upon the three men was commuted to transportation to a penal settlement. Lynch's confession immediately prior to his execution in April 1842 included an admission that, when at Newcastle in an iron-gang, he was instrumental in having three men transported from the colony for stabbing him, for which crime they were innocent as the wounds were self-inflicted as revenge against the men.

In his confession Lynch claimed that his "life" sentence, as listed in the convict indents, was an error and "that his proper sentence was seven years". Sometime after serving seven years he claimed to have "applied at Hyde Park Barracks for his freedom, and was kept for about a fortnight without getting any satisfactory answer, when he departed without it, and came to the Berrima district, where he had been formerly assigned". However, the most likely explanation for Lynch's re-appearance in the Berrima district is that he absconded from captivity.

=== The Razorback murders ===
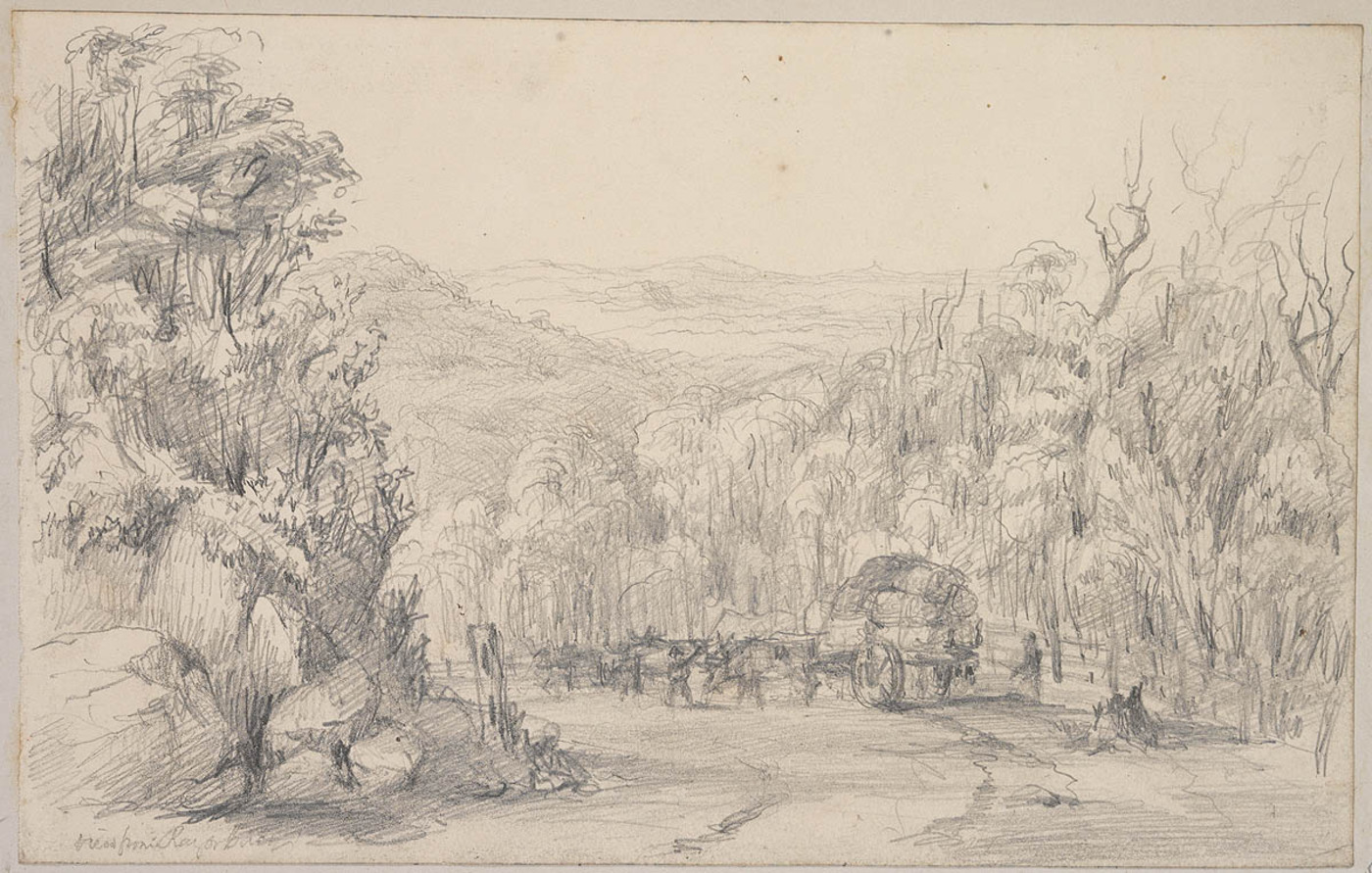
’View from Razorback’ (artist not known), pencil sketch from Colonial Sketches album (State Library of New South Wales collection).

John Lynch returned to the Berrima district in about July 1841. He firstly proceeded to John Mulligan's farm at Wombat Brush, southwest of Berrima about ten miles along the old Goulburn road. He had a relationship of long-standing with Mulligan, an emancipated convict, who had previously acted as a ‘fence’ when Lynch had committed robberies in the district. Lynch hoped to obtain his share of the proceeds of property he had previously left with Mulligan, though his former associate was not forthcoming.

After leaving Mulligan's Lynch paid a surreptitious visit to the 'Oldbury Estate', where he had previously been assigned, now under the possession of Thomas Humphrey. At ‘Oldbury’ Lynch stole eight bullocks from a paddock and began to drive them towards Sydney, with the intention of selling them. When he got to the Razorback Range, between Stonequarry and Camden, he met with a carrier named Edmund Ireland (a ticket-of-leave holder) and his helper, an Aboriginal boy. Ireland was in charge of a dray, "laden with produce", and its team of bullocks, which were owned by the pastoralist, Thomas Cowper. At this point, according to Lynch's later confession, "he began to form the plan of destroying the men, and possessing himself of the dray and property". The following morning Lynch firstly killed the boy, and then Ireland, each of them by the blow of a tomahawk on the back of the head. He dragged the bodies about a hundred yards into the bush and put them in a rocky cleft and covered the bodies with stones.

Lynch remained at the Razorback campsite for a couple of days, where he was joined by two other teams driven by men named Lee and Leggs. The three teams then made their way towards Sydney. At Dog Trap Road, leading towards Parramatta, Lynch departed from the two carriers, and continued towards Sydney. He was met on the Liverpool road by Thomas Cowper, the owner of the dray; to explain the situation Lynch told him his bullock-driver had broken his leg and the boy had gone with him to the hospital at Parramatta. Accepting this explanation Cowper then proceeded on to Sydney to await the arrival of his dray. After his departure Lynch contrived to arrive in Sydney sooner than his expected appearance, which he did by driving the team night and day. When he arrived at his destination Lynch met a man whom he described as being “half drunk”, whom he paid to "carry the things about to sell".

=== The Fraser murders ===
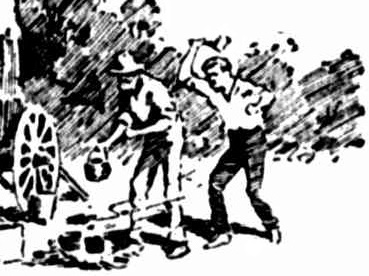
Illustration from an article published in 1935 about the serial killer, John Lynch.

After he had disposed of the stolen goods Lynch headed back with Cowper's dray and team towards Berrima. Near Razorback he met a horse team, belonging to Samuel Bawtree, and being driven by William Fraser and his son William (aged about 20 years), and decided to travel in their company. They camped for the night at Bargo Brush. Later they were joined at the camp by two men and a woman travelling in a cart. During the night, as Lynch lay under the dray and the others were dozing around the fire, a police constable on horseback arrived and “made particular enquiries for Mr. Cowper’s dray, describing it very minutely, and related the whole circumstance of the men being missing, &c.” Lynch (as described in his confession) “lay listening and trembling with fear” until he heard one of the Frasers say “they had not seen such a dray”, after which the constable departed towards Berrima. This incident caused the murderer to contemplate abandoning Cowper's dray and to “destroy the two Frazers, and possess himself of the dray in their charge”. As these thoughts “were running in his head” Lynch claimed he “prayed to the Almighty to assist me!” In the morning Lynch, while pretending he was retrieving his bullocks, instead drove them away into the bush. By this time the cart had left and Lynch told the Frasers he could not find his team and was certain they were making their way home towards Berrima. He parked the stolen dray in the bush, transferred his few possessions on the Frasers’ dray and accompanied them as they set off along the road.

They camped for the night at Cordeaux's Flat, about two and a half miles from Berrima. The next morning, 16 August 1841, he accompanied the younger Fraser to look for the horses. Hiding the tomahawk inside his coat, Lynch waited for his opportunity and struck the young man a single blow that felled him “like a log of wood”. He returned to the campsite with one horse, telling Fraser his son was still looking for the others. The murderer watched for his chance and as Fraser stooped, he struck him one blow to the back of the head “and the unhappy man fell dead”. Dragging the body into the surrounding bush, he got a spade and buried both the father and son. By the time he had finished it was late in the day, so he remained at Cordeaux's Flat for the night.

=== The murders at Mulligan's farm ===
The next day Lynch passed through Berrima with the stolen horse team, on his way to Mulligan's farm at Wombat Brush. Living at the farm were John Mulligan (aged about 61), his de facto wife, Bridget Macnamara (aged about 50) and Bridget's children, John (aged 18) and Mary (aged 13 years). When Lynch arrived on 18 August 1841 he again asserted that Mulligan owed him money, making a claim for £30, but being offered only £9. Lynch then went to Gray's Black Horse Inn, about three miles from Mulligan's, to purchase two bottles of rum. On his return with the rum he “treated the whole family, taking care not to drink much himself”. Shortly afterwards, as it was a cold night, the murderer proposed to go and cut some barrow-loads of wood if young John "would wheel them in". Lynch and the young man then left the hut. After cutting the wood Lynch took his opportunity and gave his axe "a backhanded swing", hitting John Macnamara on the back of his head. He threw some bushes over the body and returned to the hut, telling them that John had taken Lynch's horses “into the bush-paddock”.

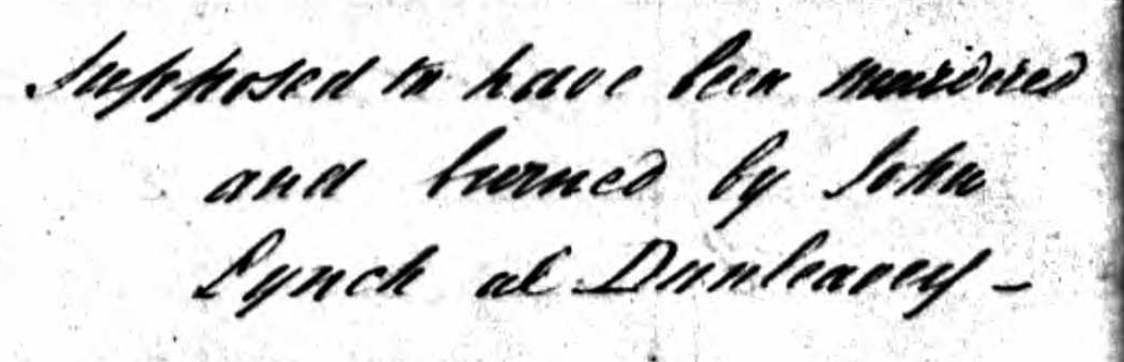
"Supposed to have been murdered and burned by John Lynch al[ias] Dunleavey"; coroner's verdict, the deaths of John Mulligan and his family near Berrima, August 1841.

After some time had elapsed and the young man had not returned Bridget Macnamara grew uneasy. They went outside and 'coo-eyed', but with no response; by now Bridget Macnamara's suspicions were aroused and she told Mulligan to get his gun. As Mulligan was walking in front of the hut with the gun, Lynch retrieved his axe from the dray on the pretext of tying up a dog. In the meantime Bridget had gone out at the back of the hut towards where the body of her son lay. Realising there was “no time to lose”, Lynch contrived to get behind the old man and struck him with the axe. He then went to meet the woman, who he knew had found her son's body. As she passed him Lynch tripped her with his foot; as she staggered he hit her with the axe, killing her. He then returned to the hut where the young girl Mary Macnamara was. Lynch asserted in his confession, “he did not wish to kill her, but he knew that if he did not, she would hang him”. He claimed he gave the thirteen year-old “10 minutes to pray for her soul” and then, “horrible to relate, he first violated her, and then murdered her!”.

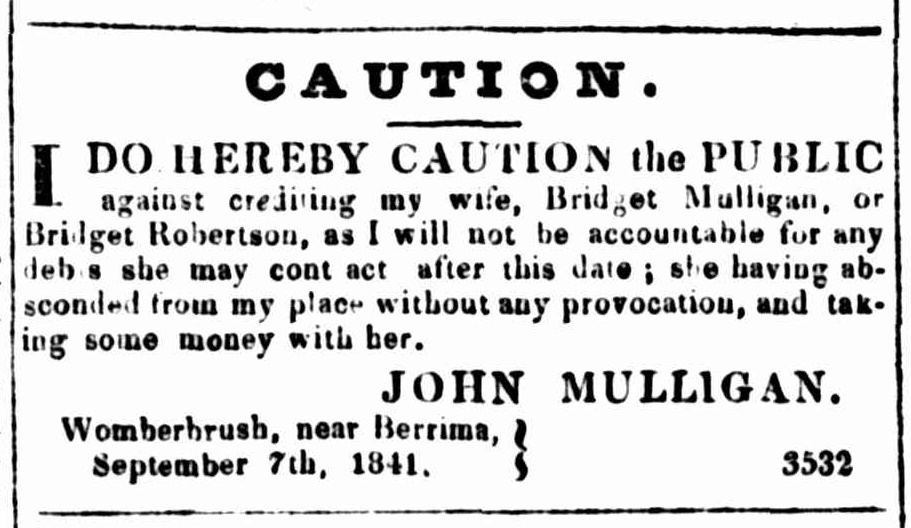
The notice placed by John Lynch in the Sydney Gazette in September 1841 after he had murdered John Mulligan and his family.

Lynch then gathered the bodies of his victims together, piled them up and burned them. He remarked during his confession: "I never seen anything like it – they burned as if they were so many bags of fat". The next morning he gathered the remains and buried them in another part of the farm and then burned most of the clothing he found in the hut. Lynch then locked the door of the hut and travelled to Sydney, where he called at the office of the Sydney Gazette newspaper and paid for a notice in the name of John Mulligan that was published on September 9. The notice stated that Mulligan's wife had “absconded… without any provocation, and taking some money with her” and cautioned the public that Mulligan would not be accountable for any debts she may incur. He also wrote several letters, as though from Mulligan, to those about Berrima to whom he knew the deceased farmer was indebted, stating he (Mulligan) had left the farm. Lynch then proceeded to the residence of the owner of the farm, William Smith of the Angel Inn near Parramatta on the Liverpool road. Calling himself Dunleavy, he repeated the story that Mulligan had left the farm at Wombat Brush and obtained a transfer of the lease into his name, but at an increased rental. Lynch next proceeded to Appin where he engaged Terrence Barnett and his wife Catherine to work as a labourer and house-keeper, and brought them to the farm at Wombat Brush. The Barnett's had previously known Lynch under his real name, but were told to refer to him as Dunleavy. Lynch claimed in his confession that “his reason for engaging these people was, he knew them to be great simpletons, and that he would be perfectly safe with them”.

After Lynch's return a man named Gordon, who resided near Mulligan's farm, went to the Mulligan's house and was greeted by Catherine Barnett. He enquired if anyone was at home, to which she replied "yes, the boy". The housekeeper then went outside and 'coo-eyed', "upon which Lynch came from a large fire in the neighbourhood". Gordon was surprised, expecting to see young John Macnamara, and enquired of his whereabouts. Lynch replied that the young man "was in some trouble at Goulburn, and that the others had gone up there to see about it". This satisfied Gordon, who then left. After Lynch's arrest Gordon provided information to the police regarding his visit to the farm, and a subsequent search revealed human remains.

By December 1841 the colonial authorities were certain that the carriers, Edmund Ireland and the unnamed Aboriginal boy, as well as William Fraser, junior and senior, had been murdered (even though no bodies had been found). By then Cowper's dray had been found “secreted in the bush”. A reward of twenty-five pounds was offered to any free person (or a conditional pardon in the case of a prisoner of the Crown) who may provide information leading to the conviction “of the party or parties by whom the drays may have been robbed, and any of the parties in charge of them murdered”.

=== The Landregan murder ===
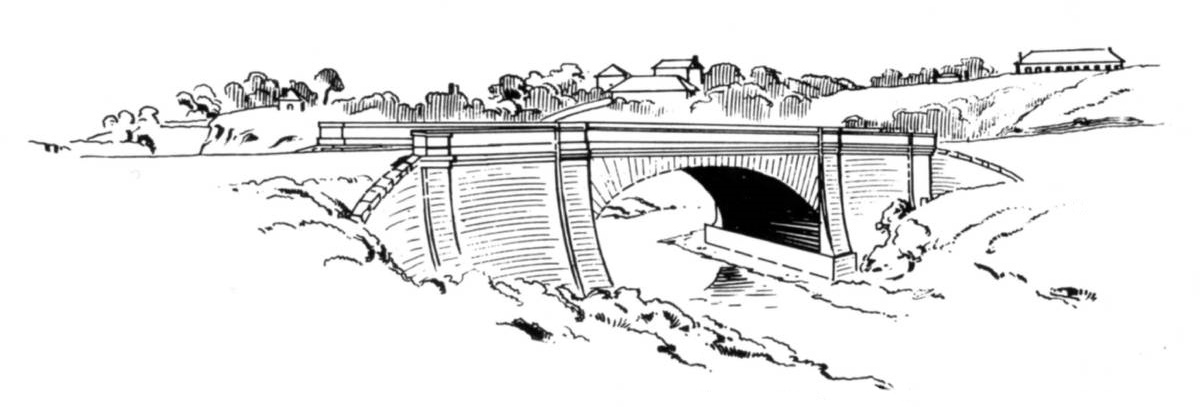
The Ironstone Bridge over the Wingecarribee River near Berrima, built in 1836 (from a sketch in Sir Thomas Mitchell’s Field Book).

Some time later Lynch, calling himself John Dunleavy, travelled to Sydney in a horse and cart on business. On his return he met Kearns Landregan, aged 27, along the road in the vicinity of the Razorback Range. Landregan had been living at Berrima in the service of an innkeeper and a few days previously had left to go to Stonequarry (Picton) to visit his brother Patrick, an assigned convict. Lynch offered to engage Landregan for £14 for six months to do fencing on the Wombat Brush farm, which Landregan accepted and the two travelled together towards Berrima. Along the way Lynch claimed he “regretted having hired him, and therefore determined, if possible, to get rid of him in some manner”. It was reported that Landregan, described as "a sober man, quiet, and of saving habits", had forty pounds in cash in his possession when he had left Berrima to visit his brother. The two men camped near the Ironstone Bridge over the Wingecarribee River, about seven miles from Berrima. The next morning, 20 February 1842, while Landregan was sitting on a log near the fire, Lynch struck him twice on the head with the back of a tomahawk. He dragged the body into the nearby bush, covered it with vegetation and proceeded to Wombat Brush, intending to return later on to bury the body.

The following morning George Sturges, a labourer for the carrier Hugh Tunney, was driving bullocks back from a creek when he discovered Landregan's body, covered with broken bushes. The Berrima police were notified, who attended the scene. Landregan had “several severe wounds” to his head and was dressed in only a shirt, with a “temperance medal attached to a string” around his neck. The body was brought to Berrima where it was identified as Landregan. On Friday, 25 February 1842, the publican, John Chalker, arrived at Berrima and provided information about a man who had stopped at his inn north of Berrima in company with the deceased. The two had taken dinner at Chalker's Woolpack Inn the day before the murder and afterwards proceeded towards Berrima in a horse and cart. Chalker told the police he "could find the man" who had murdered Landregan. He accompanied Sergeant Freer and Chief Constable Chapman to a district farm and identified the man, claiming to be John Dunleavy, as the person seen in company with Landregan. Dunleavy was taken into custody and questions began to be raised about the Mulligan family, previous occupants of the farm who were supposed to have suddenly left "and never having been heard of since". Constable Chapman later returned to the farm with Landregan's brother who identified a belt found there as belonging to the deceased. A search of the residence revealed stolen property and it was further discovered that the prisoner's real name was John Lynch, “well known in the district as a most notorious character” who had been tried in Sydney in 1836 for a murder at 'Oldbury Farm'.

Kearns Landregan was buried on 24 February 1842 at the All Saints Anglican church at Sutton Forest.

== Apprehension and execution ==
=== Investigation ===
At the time of his arrest John Lynch was described as standing five feet three inches tall, “very small whiskers (dark)” and “rather good looking”. By early March Lynch's identity was fully established and he had been formally indicted for the murder of Kearns Lanregan. Furthermore, he was suspected of murdering Edmund Ireland and the Aboriginal boy, with three men having sworn they had seen him driving Cowper's team in the vicinity of Razorback. He was also being examined on suspicion of murdering the Frasers (father and son). Enquiries were also underway regarding the fate of John Mulligan and his family. The Berrima correspondent to the Sydney Herald commented: “We doubt whether there ever existed in this Colony a man so deep in crime as this man, and yet his appearance is not in the least such as would lead one to suppose he was a murderer”.

After Lynch's arrest, Mulligan's neighbour named Gordon reported his meeting with the prisoner, who had been attending a fire at Mulligan's farm. The Police Magistrate and several policemen attended the location of the fire, pointed out by Gordon. After digging up a “considerable quantity of potatoes” they found several human bones and a tooth “apparently that of a young female”. When Lynch was informed of the discovery, he replied “that no one could swear they were Mulligan’s bones, or even that they were the bones of a white man”.

On 11 March 1842 Lynch underwent an examination at the Berrima Police Office on a charge of being implicated in the murders of Ireland and the “native black boy”, servants of Thomas Cowper. Cowper swore that a double-barrelled gun found in Lynch's possession was his property. One of Cowper's men also identified a velveteen coat and a waistcoat as being the same as those worn by Ireland. Cowper at first could not swear the prisoner was the same man he had met driving his team in the Liverpool road, but later, as Lynch passed him, he recognised him as the same man. He explained that when he first met him the man had stood sideways to him, "but on seeing his side face as he was proceeding to the gaol, he instantly recognised him". This prompted a “long tirade of abuse” by Lynch, directed at Cowper. The prisoner was then remanded in custody.

=== Trial and sentencing ===
When the Berrima Circuit Court began its round of sittings on 17 March 1842 the Chief Justice of New South Wales, Sir James Dowling, was asked to consider an affidavit from Lynch requesting “such portion of the prisoner’s property… as might be necessary to defray the cost of his defence, to be given up to him for that purpose”. The affidavit stated that the value of the property was £276, inclusive of a field of potatoes Lynch had planted which he valued at £100. Dowling directed that the prisoner be brought to the Court, after which he enquired if the prosecutor, Roger Therry, the acting Attorney-General of New South Wales, had any objection to the application. Therry pointed out that the property being claimed by the prisoner could not be considered bona fide as it was supposed to belong to the very persons for whom Lynch was under investigation for having murdered. Furthermore, Therry also observed that Lynch was a convict under sentence of transportation for life, and as such, was unable to own property, whether real or personal. In the end the Court decided it was unable to accede to Lynch's application to fund his legal defence.

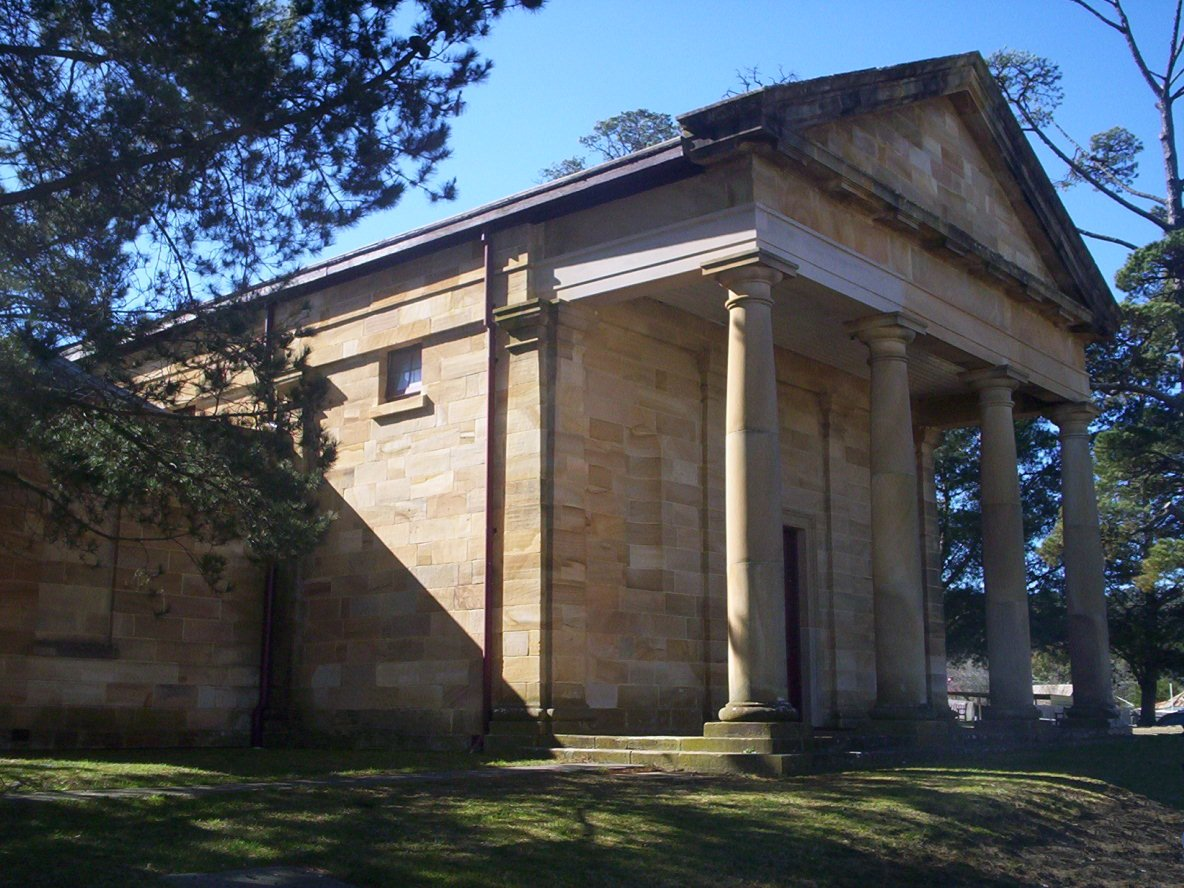
The Berrima Courthouse (built in 1838) where John Lynch was tried and sentenced to death in March 1842.

John Lynch, alias John Dunleavy, was tried in the Berrima Circuit Court on Monday, 21 March 1842, before a jury and Justice Dowling. Lynch was charged with the wilful murder of Kearns Landregan, to which he pleaded not guilty. From the outset the prisoner, addressing the judge, “expressed a hope that His Honor would allow him to have a full and fair trial, as there had been a general prejudice created against him by the numerous crimes laid to his charge”. Dowling replied that "the respectability of the Jury was ample security that the prisoner would have justice done him". A range of witnesses gave evidence in a trial that lasted twelve hours, during which the court was crowded, with many who attended having travelled "upwards of thirty miles". It was reported that "a considerable number of females were present during the whole day". The prisoner cross-examined most of the witnesses, endeavouring to cast doubt on their testimony; it was reported that Lynch "questioned the witnesses with a degree of ability far beyond the expectations of those who saw him". At ten o’clock in the evening, after retiring for a few minutes, the jury returned a verdict of guilty against the prisoner.

Two days after the trial, on Wednesday, 23 March 1842, the Court assembled for the sentencing of the prisoner, John Lynch. Justice Dowling “put on the black cap” and addressed the prisoner, beginning with: “John Lynch, the trade in blood which has so long marked your career, is at last terminated, not by any sense of remorse or the sating of any appetite for slaughter on your part, but by the energy of a few zealous spirits, scared into activity by the frightful picture of atrocity which the last tragic passage of your worthless life exhibits”. During his discourse Dowling concluded that “avarice seems to have been the sole motive”, observing that “neither age nor youth has been spared in gratifying the sordid lust of gain”. Dowling concluded his address by sentencing Lynch to death by hanging. After being sentenced, Lynch, "with considerable emotion", said that the Barnetts, who had been held in custody during the investigation and court processes, were innocent of having anything to do with the charge for which he had been convicted. He further claimed that “any thing that was done at his house” was done before the Barnetts were engaged as his servants. As he was being removed from the bar, Lynch “expressed his determination to reveal nothing”.

George Barton, who had been the master at ‘Oldbury Farm’ in 1836 at the time of Lynch's indictment for the murder of Thomas Smith, had been the subject of disparaging newspaper comments when the full scope of Lynch's crimes was revealed in March 1842. An editorial in the Sydney Herald claimed that Lynch had been acquitted of Smith's murder “through the drunkenness of a principal witness”. This was a reference to Barton's testimony at the 1836 trial being rejected by Justice Burton for having appeared in court in a drunken state, for which appearance Barton received a fine. In a letter to the editors of the Sydney Herald two days before Lynch was to hang, Barton denied he had been drunk, claiming to have been exhausted from the journey to Sydney and “in a very weak state of health”. He also challenged the statement that he was “the principal witness”, claiming his evidence was “very immaterial” to the case. Barton enclosed copies of affidavits with his letter (also published) from several doctors and other witnesses to his condition, which had been submitted to Justice Burton through Barton's barrister to request remission of the fine (to which Burton had responded that “he has seen no cause for changing his opinion”).

=== Confession and execution ===
In mid-April Matthew Ashe of the Sheriff's Office in Sydney travelled to Berrima to supervise the execution of Lynch and Patrick Kleighran (or Clearahan), who had been convicted on a separate murder charge. As the gallows was fitted to hang only one person, it was planned to hang the criminals one after the other, one hour apart.

After his apprehension and throughout his trial Lynch had maintained his innocence and had “expressed a determination of not making a public confession of his crimes”. However, on the day before he was to hang, the prisoner made a full confession to Rev. Summers, who had been attending him, and afterwards "freely confessed" to the Police Magistrate George Bowen. Extensive details of his confession were published after his execution. Even though Bowen had already located human remains on the farm, after Lynch had confessed he was taken to Mulligan's farm on the evening previous to his execution, where he confirmed the spot where he had buried the remains of Mulligan and his family.

John Lynch was executed by hanging on the temporary gallows at the back of the new Berrima Gaol on Friday morning, 22 April 1842. Lynch's demeanour on the scaffold was described as one who "betrayed not the least fear of death". It was noted that, though his lips moved, "it seemed more from mechanical agency than from any inward feeling of repentance and contrition for his previous dreadful life".

=== Aftermath ===
The bodies of the Frasers, father and son, were found in the vicinity of Cordeaux's Flat near Berrima, as described in the murderer's confession. William Fraser and his son William were buried on 4 May 1842 in the All Saints Anglican churchyard at Sutton Forest. Also buried there, on the same day, were those remains that could be retrieved of John Mulligan, Bridget Macnamara and her two children, Mary and John.

The Berrima Police Magistrate, George Bowen, proceeded to the Razorback locality to search for the remains of Ireland and the Aboriginal boy, but initially no trace could be found. It was presumed “the native dogs must have got at them”. However, a further search was made and bones were found on 10 May 1842, described in the Register of Coroners’ Inquests and Magisterial Inquiries as “Bones of a white man and Abor[iginal] Black… supposed to be the Bones of Mr. Cowper’s Dray Man & Black Boy – murdered by Lynch al[ias] Dunleavy at Razorback!”

In 2019 the Berrima District Historical and Family History Society installed a plaque in the graveyard of All Saints Anglican church at Sutton Forest to mark the graves of six of the local victims of John Lynch (Thomas Smith, John and Bridget Mulligan, Bridget's two children John and Mary, and Kearns Landregan). The plaque was unveiled on 8 September 2019.

== The victims ==
- Thomas Smith (or Smyth) – a convict ploughman, assigned to James Atkinson at ‘Oldbury Farm’ (probably in the late 1820s); participated in a Sutton Forest Ploughing Match in June 1829; murdered by Lynch (probably in association with John Williamson) on 4 March 1836 at 'Oldbury Farm'.
- An Aboriginal boy – identified only as “an aboriginal native” or “a black boy”, he was Edmund Ireland's offsider in his work as a carrier driving a bullock team for Thomas Cowper; murdered by Lynch in late July or early August 1841 in the vicinity of the Razorback Range.
- Edmund Ireland – born in about 1796 at Reigate, county Surrey (south of London); occupation: "farmersman & shepherd"; tried and convicted of highway robbery at the Surrey Assizes at Guildford on 17 July 1826 and sentenced to transportation for life; transported aboard the Champion, departed in May 1827 and arrived at Sydney in October; in November 1838 Ireland was granted a ticket-of-leave by the Braidwood Bench of Magistrates; worked as a carrier driving a bullock team for Thomas Cowper; murdered by Lynch, aged 45 years, in late July or early August 1841 in the vicinity of the Razorback Range.
- William Fraser – born in about 1821, the son of William Fraser; from the Illawarra region; murdered by Lynch on 16 August 1841 at Cordeaux's Flat, near Berrima, aged about 20 years.
- William Fraser – born in about 1791; from the Illawarra region; murdered by Lynch on 16 August 1841 at Cordeaux's Flat, near Berrima, aged about 50 years.
- John Macnamara – born in 1823, son of Bridget Macnamara; killed by John Lynch at Mulligan's farm at Wombat Brush, near Berrima, aged 18 years.
- John Mulligan – born in about 1780 in county Monaghan, Ireland; convicted at the Louth Assizes, Dundalk, in July 1817, sentenced to 14 years transportation; transported aboard the Tyne, departed from Cork in July 1818 and arrived at Sydney in January 1819; granted a ticket-of-leave on 2 February 1826 in the Argyle district; received his Certificate of Freedom in January 1832; murdered at his farm by Lynch, aged about 61 years.
- Bridget Macnamara – born in about 1791; described as Mulligan's "reputed wife"; murdered by Lynch, aged about 50 years.
- Mary Macnamara – born in 1828, daughter of Bridget Macnamara; raped and murdered by Lynch, aged 13 years.
- Kearns Landregan – born in 1815 in Ireland; his older brother Patrick was convicted of manslaughter at Tipperary, transported for life to New South Wales aboard the Blenheim, arriving in November 1834; Kearns Landregan married Mary (surname not known) and the couple immigrated to New South Wales in about 1839; in service at Raymond Terrace and then George Harpur's farm at Stonequarry; in late 1841 Landregan left his wife at Harpur's (in Mary Landregan's words) “to do the best for us; I stopped there in hopes he would get another place and come back”; worked for several months in the service of Bryan McMahon, innkeeper at Berrima, and left on 15 February 1842 to visit his brother at Stonequarry; murdered by Lynch on 20 February 1842 near Berrima, aged 27 years.
