= Vincent George Dowling =

English journalist and early sports writer (1785–1852)

Vincent George Dowling (1785–1852) was an English journalist. He was an influential figure in the development of sports journalism, who also worked covertly as a government informer.

== Life ==
The son of Vincent Dowling (1756–1825), an Irish journalist and bookseller, and elder brother of Sir James Dowling and Alfred Septimus Dowling, he was born in London, and received his earlier education in Ireland. He returned to London with his father after the Anglo-Irish Union in 1801, and sometimes helped him in his duties for The Times. Soon after he went to work for the newspaper The Star, and in 1809 transferred to The Day. In 1804 he had become a contributor to The Observer, launching a working relationship with William Innell Clement that continued until Clement's death in 1852.

Dowling was present in the lobby of the House of Commons when John Bellingham shot Spencer Perceval, on 11 May 1812, and was one of the first persons to seize the murderer, from whose pocket he took a loaded pistol. From open reporting on a meeting of radicals at Spa Fields in 1816, Dowling moved to gathering intelligence in public houses for the Home Office. He gave evidence at the trial of James Watson the Spencean in 1817.

At times, Dowling went to great lengths to obtain early news for the Observer. When Queen Caroline was about to return from the continent, after the accession of George IV in June 1820, Dowling proceeded to France to record her progress, and being entrusted with her majesty's despatches, he crossed the Channel in an open boat during a stormy night, and was the first to arrive in London with the news.

Dowling was appointed editor of Bell's Life in London in August 1824, a post he held for the rest of his life. He claimed to be the author of the plan on which the Metropolitan Police was organised; the names of the officers, inspectors, sergeants, and so on, were published in Bell's Life nearly two years before Sir Robert Peel spoke on the subject in 1829. He was active in London parish affairs; was constantly named stakeholder and referee in major sporting contests; and wanted to make boxing cleaner and more sporting. He died from disease of the heart, paralysis, and dropsy, at Stanmore Lodge, Kilburn, 25 October 1852.

== Works ==
In 1840 Dowling wrote Fistiana, or the Oracle of the Ring, a work which he then made an annual. He was also the writer of the article on "Boxing" in Delabere Pritchett Blaine's Cyclopædia of Rural Sports (1852, reprinted 1870).

== Family ==
Frank Lewis Dowling, his son, took over the editorship of Bell's Life, though Henry Hall Dixon was given the refusal of it, and of Fistiana.

== Notes ==
Attribution

This article incorporates text from a publication now in the public domain: Stephen, Leslie, ed. (1888). "Dowling, Vincent George". Dictionary of National Biography. Vol. 15. London: Smith, Elder & Co.
