= Frank Dowling (disambiguation) =

Frank Dowling was a British newspaper editor.

Frank or Francis Dowling may also refer to:

- Frank Dowling, a character in the film Alice Adams
- Father Frank Dowling, character in Father Dowling Mysteries
- Francis Dowling (politician), see Candidates of the Australian federal election, 1966

== See also ==
- John Francis Dowling (1851–?), Ontario physician and political figure
