= Vincent Dowling (disambiguation) =

Vincent Dowling (1929–2013) was an Irish actor and director.

Vincent Dowling may also refer to:

- Vincent George Dowling (1785–1852), an English journalist
- Vincent James Dowling (1835–1903), Australian explorer and pastoralist
