= List of shipwrecks in April 1837 =

The list of shipwrecks in April 1837 includes ships sunk, foundered, wrecked, grounded, or otherwise lost during April 1837.

== 1 April ==
List of shipwrecks: 1 April 1837
Ship	State	Description
Calypso	United Kingdom	The ship departed from London for Quebec City, Lower Canada, British North America. No further trace, presumed foundered with the loss of all hands.
Harriet	(United Kingdom of Great Britain and Ireland) British North America	The sealer was driven ashore at Grates Cove, Newfoundland. She was later refloated.
Isabella	(United Kingdom of Great Britain and Ireland) Van Diemen's Land	The barque was wrecked at Cape Nelson. All on board survived. She was on a voyage from Launceston, Tasmania to Spencer Gulf, South Australia.
Nahant	United States	The ship was struck by lightning in the Atlantic Ocean. She caught fire and was abandoned by her crew. She was on a voyage from New Orleans, Louisiana to Liverpool, Lancashire, United Kingdom.
Prince Regent	United Kingdom	The ship was driven ashore near Drogheda, County Louth. Her crew were rescued. She was on a voyage from Pembrey, Carmarthenshire to Drogheda.

== 2 April ==
List of shipwrecks: 2 April 1837
Ship	State	Description
Amethyst	United Kingdom	The ship was driven ashore at Ryhope, County Durham.
Betsey	United Kingdom	The ship was driven ashore and abandoned near Swansea, Glamorgan. She was on a voyage from Bristol, Gloucestershire to Dublin.
Domus	United Kingdom	The ship was driven ashore between Hartlepool and Sunderland, County Durham.
Hopewell	United Kingdom	The ship was driven ashore and severely damaged between Hartlepool and Sunderland.
Jarvis	United Kingdom	The ship was driven ashore at Sunderland.
Jarrow	United Kingdom	The ship was driven ashore and severely damaged between Seaham and Sunderland.
Josephine	France	The brig was driven ashore and wrecked at Hendon, County Durham. Her crew were rescued by the Sunderland Lifeboat.
Lavinia	United Kingdom	The ship was driven ashore and wrecked between Hartlepool and Sunderland.
Leah	United Kingdom	The ship sprang a leak and was abandoned in the Atlantic Ocean. Her crew were rescued. She was on a voyage from Falmouth, Cornwall to Newfoundland, British North America.
Nancy	United Kingdom	The ship was driven ashore at Dunany Point, County Louth. She was refloated on 10 April and taken in to Dundalk.
New Concord	United Kingdom	The ship was driven ashore between Sunderland and Hartlepool.
Peggy	United Kingdom	The ship was in collision with another vessel and was consequently beached between Neath and Swansea, Glamorgan. Her crew were rescued. She was on a voyage from Dublin to Bristol, Gloucestershire.
Pleasant	United Kingdom	The schooner was driven ashore and severely damaged between Hartlepool and Sunderland.
Sarah	United Kingdom	The ship departed from Swansea for Liverpool, Lancashire. No further trace, presumed foundered with the loss of all hands.
Smith	United Kingdom	The ship was driven ashore at Old Seaham, County Durham.
Speculation	United Kingdom	The sloop was driven ashore at Sunderland.
Sussex	United Kingdom	The sloop was driven ashore between Seaham and Sunderland.
Victory	United Kingdom	The ship was wrecked on rocks off Hendon.

== 3 April ==
List of shipwrecks: 3 April 1837
Ship	State	Description
Albion	United Kingdom	The ship foundered in the English Channel off Fairlight, Sussex. Her crew were rescued by Alfred (United Kingdom).
Assiduous	United Kingdom	The ship was driven ashore and wrecked on the Black Hall Rocks, County Durham. Her crew were rescued. She was on a voyage from Boston, Lincolnshire to Newcastle upon Tyne, Northumberland.
Betsey and Mary	United Kingdom	The ship was driven ashore and wrecked at Robin Hoods Bay, Yorkshire. Her crew were rescued.
Eagle	United Kingdom	The ship ran aground and sank in the River Eske. She was on a voyage from Liverpool, Lancashire to Donegal.
Incertus	United Kingdom	The ship was in collision with George (United Kingdom) and foundered off Fairlight. Her crew were rescued. She was on a voyage from Newcastle upon Tyne, Northumberland to Dublin.
New Manley	United Kingdom	The ship struck The Manacles, Cornwall and sank. Her crew were rescued, She was on a voyage from King's Lynn, Norfolk to Sligo.
Vernon	United Kingdom	The ship was driven ashore at Laxey, Isle of Man. Her crew were rescued. She was on a voyage from Liverpool, Lancashire to Glasgow, Renfrewshire.

== 4 April ==
List of shipwrecks: 4 April 1837
Ship	State	Description
Alexander	United Kingdom	The ship ran aground on the Belfast Reef, off Antigua. She was on a voyage from Liverpool, Lancashire to New Orleans, Louisiana, United States. Alexander was refloated on 8 April and taken in to Antigua for repairs.
Essex	United Kingdom	The ship was driven ashore near Sunderland, County Durham.
John Morgan	United Kingdom	The ship was driven ashore at "Portlain". She was on a voyage from Newport, Monmouthshire to Liverpool. She was later refloated and resumed her voyage.
Star	United Kingdom	The ship was wrecked on Grand Cayman. She was on a voyage from Liverpool to New York, United States.

== 5 April ==
List of shipwrecks: 5 April 1837
Ship	State	Description
Diana	United Kingdom	The brig was abandoned off Beachy Head, Sussex and subsequently foundered. All on board were rescued. She was on a voyage from Newport, Monmouthshire to London.
Draper	United Kingdom	The ship was driven ashore at St. Nicholas-at-Wade, Kent. She sank on 8 April. Draper was refloated on 18 April and taken into Margate, Kent.
Peggy	United Kingdom	The ship was driven ashore whilst on a voyage from Bristol, Gloucestershire to Dublin. She was refloated on 7 April and taken in to Swansea, Glamorgan.

== 6 April ==
List of shipwrecks: 6 April 1837
Ship	State	Description
Azores Packet	United Kingdom	The ship was holed by her anchor and sank in Stonehouse Pool. She was on a voyage from São Miguel Island, Azores to London. Azores Packet was refloated on 9 April and taken in to Plymouth, Devon.
Brutus	United States	The brig was driven ashore and wrecked at Mogadore, Morocco.
Emma	United Kingdom	The ship was struck the South Knowl, off the mouth of the River Tees. She then struck the North Gar and sank.
James Gaunt	United Kingdom	The ship was driven ashore crewless and wrecked on Inneskea Island, County Mayo.
Phœnix	United Kingdom	The whaler was driven ashore and damaged at Whitby, Yorkshire. She was refloated on 22 April and taken in to Whitby.

== 7 April ==
List of shipwrecks: 7 April 1837
Ship	State	Description
Ann	United Kingdom	The smack was destroyed by fire at Cheekpoint, County Waterford.
Emma	United Kingdom	The ship ran aground on the South Gar, in the North Sea. She was refloated the next day, but consequently sank off the North Gar.

== 8 April ==
List of shipwrecks: 8 April 1837
Ship	State	Description
Furst Hardenburg	Stettin	The ship was driven ashore at Helsingør, Denmark. She was on a voyage from Stettin to an English Port. Furst Hardenburg was later refloated and taken in to Copenhagen, Denmark.
Neutral	Norway	The brig sprang a leak and foundered in the North Sea off Bawdsey, Suffolk, United Kingdom. Her crew were rescued. She was on a voyage from Dram to Amsterdam, North Holland, Netherlands110437.
Petite Louise	France	The ship was wrecked on a reef off "Kaneun Island", Mexico. All on board were rescued.
Pilot	United Kingdom	The ship was driven ashore and wrecked at Penarth, Glamorgan. She was on a voyage from Cardiff, Glamorgan to Waterford.
Proven	United States	The ship was driven ashore at Castrup, Denmark. She was on a voyage from Danzig to the United States. Proven was later refloated and towed into Copenhagen.
Swallow	United Kingdom	The brig foundered off Fresh Water, Newfoundland, British North America with the loss of all nine crew. She was on a voyage from Liverpool to St. John's, Newfoundland.
William IV	United Kingdom	The ship sank on the Nore. Her crew were rescued. She was on a voyage from South Shields, County Durham to London.

== 9 April ==
List of shipwrecks: 9 April 1837
Ship	State	Description
Annette	United Kingdom	The ship was wrecked on "Folster Island". Her crew were rescued. She was on a voyage from London to Reval, Russia.
George IV	United Kingdom	The brig ran aground on the Nore. She was later refloated and put in to Dover, Kent.
Warigt Harmonie	Norway	The ship was wrecked on the Haisborough Sands, in the North Sea off the coast of Norfolk, United Kingdom. Her crew were rescued. She was on a voyage from Frederickstadt to London, United Kingdom. Warigt Harmonie was beached at Great Yarmouth on 11 April in a wrecked condition.

== 10 April ==
List of shipwrecks: 10 April 1837
Ship	State	Description
Emanuel	France	The ship was driven ashore on "Milne", Finistère.
Fancy	United Kingdom	The ship was wrecked on the Woolpack. Her crew were rescued by a lifeboat. She was on a voyage from Sunderland, County Durham to King's Lynn, Norfolk.
Gertrude	United Kingdom	The ship foundered in the North Sea off Lowestoft, Suffolk.
St. Joseph	France	The ship was driven ashore on Milne.
Sully	United Kingdom	The ship was driven ashore on Milne.
Unity	United Kingdom	The ship was driven ashore at Lowestoft, Suffolk. She was refloated on 12 April and taken in to Lowestoft.

== 11 April ==
List of shipwrecks: 11 April 1837
Ship	State	Description
Alceste	United Kingdom	The ship was wrecked near Navarino, Greece. She was on a voyage from Alexandria, Egypt to Trieste.
Cupido	Stralsund	The ship was driven ashore near Stralsund. She was on a voyage from Stralsund to New York, United States.
Ganges	United Kingdom	The ship was driven ashore in Cushendall Bay. Her crew were rescued. She was on a voyage from Maranhão, Brazil to Liverpool, Lancashire. Ganges was refloated on 15 April and taken in to Larne, County Antrim for repairs.
Haddo House	United Kingdom	The ship was driven ashore on the south coast of Møn, Denmark. She was on a voyage from Sunderland, County Durham to Danzig.
Penrhos	United Kingdom	The barque foundered in the Atlantic Ocean (36°50′N 9°55′W). Her crew were rescued by Nieuew Onderneming (Netherlands).
Peleka or Twa Gebroeders	Netherlands	The galiot was discovered waterlogged and abandoned off Texel, North Holland. She was towed in to Great Yarmouth, Norfolk, United Kingdom by Perseverance (United Kingdom).
Phœnix	United Kingdom	The collier, a brig, foundered in the Dogger Bank with the loss of two of her crew. Survivors were rescued by a Dutch fishing vessel. She was on a voyage from Newcastle upon Tyne, Northumberland to Copenhagen.
St. Thomas	Kingdom of the Two Sicilies	The ship was driven ashore and wrecked near "Prestoe", Denmark. She was on a voyage from Messina to Saint Petersburg, Russia.
Two Sisters	United Kingdom	The ship sank in the River Tay. Her crew were rescued.

== 12 April ==
List of shipwrecks: 12 April 1837
Ship	State	Description
City of Dublin	United Kingdom	The steamship was driven ashore on the coast of County Louth. She was refloated on 18 April and taken into Dublin.
Laura	United Kingdom	The ship was wrecked at Adra, Spain. She was on a voyage from Liverpool, Lancashire to Adra.

== 13 April ==
List of shipwrecks: 13 April 1837
Ship	State	Description
Sophia Margaretha	Bremen	The ship was driven ashore at Wells-next-the-Sea, Norfolk, United Kingdom. She was refloated the next day and taken in to Bremen.

== 16 April ==
List of shipwrecks: 16 April 1837
Ship	State	Description
Alexander	United Kingdom	The schooner was wrecked on the "Vieux Boneaud", Basses-Pyrénées, France.

== 17 April ==
List of shipwrecks: 17 April 1837
Ship	State	Description
Henricus	United States	The ship was abandoned in the Atlantic Ocean with the loss of five of her crew. She was on a voyage from Antwerp, Belgium to Manzanilla, Trinidad.
Princess	United Kingdom	The ship struck a reef, sprang a leak and was abandoned in the Mediterranean Sea. She was on a voyage from Bahia, Brazil to Trieste. Princess was later driven ashore at Cape Passero, Sicily. She was later refloated and taken into Palermo for repairs.
Sophia Charlotte	Duchy of Holstein	The ship was driven ashore near Flensburg. She was on a voyage from Flensburg to Liverpool, Lancashire, United Kingdom.
Venus	United Kingdom	The ship was driven ashore at Darß, Prussia. Her crew were rescued.
Westchester	United States	The ship was struck by lightning and set on fire whilst on a voyage from New York to Liverpool. She put into Portsmouth, New Hampshire, where she was scuttled.

== 18 April ==
List of shipwrecks: 18 April 1837
Ship	State	Description
Albion	United Kingdom	The paddle steamer struck a rock in Jack Sound and was beached near Milford Haven, Pembrokeshire, where she sank the next day. All on board were rescued. She was on a voyage from Dublin to Bristol, Gloucestershire.
David	United Kingdom	The snow was wrecked on the Goodwin Sands, Kent. Her crew were rescued by Flora, Po and Royal Sovereign (all United Kingdom). David was on a voyage from Sunderland, County Durham to Southampton, Hampshire.

== 19 April ==
List of shipwrecks: 19 April 1837
Ship	State	Description
Prosperous	United Kingdom	The sloop was driven ashore at South Head, Aberdeenshire. She was on a voyage from Aberdeen to Peterhead.

== 20 April ==
List of shipwrecks: 20 April 1837
Ship	State	Description
Providentia	Prussia	The ship was driven ashore and wrecked at Memel. She was on a voyage from Memel to Woodbridge, Suffolk, United Kingdom. Providentia was refloated on 29 April and resumed her voyage.
Wellesley	United Kingdom	The barque was lost off Happisburgh, Norfolk with the loss of all hands. She was on a voyage from Newcastle upon Tyne, Northumberland to Quebec City, Lower Canada, British North America.

== 21 April ==
List of shipwrecks: 21 April 1837
Ship	State	Description
Providentia	Prussia	The ship was driven ashore and wrecked at Memel. She was on a voyage from Memel to Woodbridge, Suffolk, United Kingdom.
Vigilant	Russia	The schooner ran aground on the Goodwin Sands, Kent, United Kingdom and was abandoned by her crew. She was on a voyage from Messina, Sicily to Saint Petersburg. Vigilant was refloated on 26 April and taken into Ramsgate, Kent.

== 22 April ==
List of shipwrecks: 22 April 1837
Ship	State	Description
Herald	United Kingdom	The ship was wrecked at Listerlandet, Sweden. She was on a voyage from Newcastle upon Tyne, Northumberland to Danzig.

== 23 April ==
List of shipwrecks: 23 April 1837
Ship	State	Description
Alerte	France	The ship was driven ashore near Calais. She was on a voyage from London, United Kingdom to Calais.
James Holmes	United Kingdom	The ship ran aground on the Arklow Banks, in the Irish Sea off the coast of County Wicklow and capsized. She was on a voyage from Dublin to Demerara. James Holmes was later righted and put back to Dublin.
Mathilde	Rostock	The ship sank near Kirchdorf, Prussia. Her crew were rescued. She was on a voyage from Rostock to Bordeaux, Gironde, France.
Zeemeeuw	Netherlands	The ship ran aground on the Mercator Reef. She was on a voyage from Amsterdam, North Holland to Batavia, Netherlands East Indies.

== 25 April ==
List of shipwrecks: 25 April 1837
Ship	State	Description
Dunvegan Castle	United Kingdom	The ship was wrecked on the Lemon Sand. She was on a voyage from South Shields, County Durham to Demerara.
Nancies	United Kingdom	The ship was holed by an anchor and sank at Dundalk, County Louth. She was on a voyage from Swansea, Glamorgan to Dundalk.
Priam	United Kingdom	The barque was wrecked on Green Island, Newfoundland, British North America with the loss of four of her nine crew. She was on a voyage from Plymouth, Devon to Miramichi, New Brunswick, British North America.

== 27 April ==
List of shipwrecks: 27 April 1837
Ship	State	Description
Mills	United Kingdom	The ship ran aground on the Swilly Rock, in the Irish Sea. She was on a voyage from the River Dee to Caernarfon. She was refloated the next day and taken in to Bangor.
Nederlanden	Netherlands	The ship was driven ashore 6 nautical miles (11 km) west of Calais, France. She was on a voyage from Surinam to Amsterdam, North Holland. Nederlanden was refloated on 5 May and taken in to Calais.
Scotland	United Kingdom	The ship ran aground at the mouth of the Mississippi River.

== 28 April ==
List of shipwrecks: 28 April 1837
Ship	State	Description
Dolphin	Netherlands	The ship was wrecked on "Beri Island". She was on a voyage from Rotterdam, South Holland to Havana, Cuba.
Four Sisters	United Kingdom	The ship was driven ashore at Flamborough Head, Yorkshire. She was on a voyage from Great Yarmouth, Norfolk to South Shields, County Durham. Four Sisters was refloated the next day and resumed her voyage.
Kitty	United Kingdom	The ship was driven ashore at Whitby, Yorkshire. She was on a voyage from Wisbech, Cambridgeshire to Seaham, County Durham. Kitty was refloated the next day and taken into Whitby.
Mary	United Kingdom	The ship was driven ashore at Flamborough Head. She was on a voyage from Dungeness, Kent to Sunderland, County Durham. Mary was refloated the next day and resumed her voyage.
New Hope	United Kingdom	The ship was in collision with a canal boat and sank in the Gloucester and Sharpness Canal. She was on a voyage from Barrow-in-Furness, Cumberland to Gloucester.
William	United Kingdom	The ship was driven ashore at Flamborough Head. She was on a voyage from Hull, Yorkshire to Newcastle upon Tyne, Northumberland.

== 29 April ==
List of shipwrecks: 29 April 1837
Ship	State	Description
Agnes	United Kingdom	The smack sank in Plymouth Sound. Her crew were rescued.
Brothers	United Kingdom	The ship was wrecked on the Mills, off Bermuda.
Diligence	United Kingdom	The ship was driven ashore at Marbella, Spain. Diligence had been refloated by 14 May and taken into Málaga for repairs.
Levant	United Kingdom	The ship ran aground on the Harry Furlong Rocks, off the coast of Anglesey. She was on a voyage from Gallipoli, Ottoman Empire to Liverpool, Lancashire. Levant was later refloated and taken into Holyhead, Anglesey.

== 30 April ==
List of shipwrecks: 30 April 1837
Ship	State	Description
Albion	United Kingdom	The smack was wrecked near Aberdovey, Merionethshire.
Agnes	United Kingdom	The smack sank in Plymouth Sound. Her crew were rescued.
Friends	United Kingdom	The ship struck The Manacles and was consequently beached at Helford, Cornwall.
Margaret Cunningham	United Kingdom	The ship sprang a leak and was beached at Harwich, Essex. She was on a voyage from Perth to London.
Mary	United Kingdom	The ship sprang a leak and was beached at Poole, Dorset. She was on a voyage from Waterford to Fareham, Hampshire.

== Unknown date ==
List of shipwrecks: Unknown date in April 1837
Ship	State	Description
Alpha	United Kingdom	The ship was driven ashore and wrecked on the west coast of Jutland. Her crew were rescued. She was on a voyage from London to Danzig.
Brunswick	United Kingdom	The ship foundered off Padstow, Cornwall before 8 April.
Caroline	United Kingdom	The ship was sunk by ice at St. John's, Newfoundland, British North America.
Carroll	United States	The brig was wrecked off Cape Lookout. Her crew survived. She was on a voyage from New Orleans, Louisiana to Baltimore, Maryland.
Catherina	Duchy of Holstein	The ship was driven ashore at Spurn Point, Yorkshire, United Kingdom. She was on a voyage from Flensburg to Fisherrow, Lothian, United Kingdom.
Diligence	United Kingdom	The ship was driven ashore at Marbella, Spain. She had been refloated by mid-May and taken in to Málaga.
Dream	United Kingdom	The ship was wrecked on Green Island, British North America with the loss of seven of her crew. She was on a voyage from Plymouth, Devon to Miramichi, New Brunswick, British North America.
Eunice	(United Kingdom of Great Britain and Ireland) British North America	The sealer was wrecked in Newfoundland. Her crew were rescued.
Fair America	United States	The fishing schooner sank in a gale on the Georges Bank. Lost with all 7 crew.
Fancy	United Kingdom	The ship was wrecked near Wells-next-the-Sea, Norfolk. Her crew were rescued. She was on a voyage from Sunderland, County Durham to King's Lynn, Norfolk.
Hope	United States	The brig was abandoned in the Atlantic Ocean before 17 April.
Isabella	(United Kingdom of Great Britain and Ireland) Van Diemen's Land	The ship was wrecked in Portland Bay, New South Wales before 7 April. Her crew were rescued. She was on a voyage from Launceston to the Spencer Gulf.
Justina	France	The ship was driven ashore at "Carmeyne". She was on a voyage from Mogadore, Morocco to Marseille, Bouches-du-Rhône.
Kate	(United Kingdom of Great Britain and Ireland) British North America	The sealer, a schooner, was crushed by ice and sank in Bonavista Bay.
Mexican	United Kingdom	The ship was driven ashore on the coast of Jutland. Her crew were rescued. She was on a voyage from London to Copenhagen, Denmark.
Nioord	Norway	The ship was abandoned in the Atlantic Ocean 300 nautical miles (560 km) south west of The Lizard, Cornwall, United Kingdom on or before 8 April. She was on a voyage from Tarragona, Spain to Guernsey, Channel Islands.
Proven	United States	The ship was driven ashore at Helsingør. She was on a voyage from Danzig to New York. Proven was later refloated and taken in to Copenhagen.
Scotsman	United Kingdom	The ship was driven ashore in Køge Bay before 16 April. She was refloated that day and towed into Copenhagen.
St. Jubilee	United States	The ship foundered in the Atlantic Ocean.
Triestina	France	The ship was driven ashore on the coast of Camargue, Bouches-du-Rhône. She was on a voyage from Mogadore, Morocco to Marseille.
Venus	(United Kingdom of Great Britain and Ireland) British North America	The sealer was abandoned in Bonavista Bay. Her crew were rescued.
Venus	United Kingdom	The ship was driven ashore at Stralsund. She was refloated on 10 June and resumed her voyage to Riga, Russia.
Vesta	United States	The fishing schooner sank in a gale on the Georges Bank. Lost with all 7 hands.
Ward	United Kingdom	The brig was abandoned in the Atlantic Ocean. She was on a voyage from Liverpool, Lancashire to an American port. Ward subsequently came ashore at La Flotte, Île de Ré, Charente-Maritime, France. She was later refloated and taken in to La Flotte.
