= William Innell Clement =

English newspaper proprietor

- Born: William Innell Clement; 15 January 1780; Westminster, London, England
- Died: 24 January 1852 (aged 72); Hackney, Middlesex, England
- Resting place: Kensal Green Cemetery
- Occupation: Newspaper proprietor

William Innell Clement (15 January 1780 – 24 January 1852) was an English newspaper proprietor.

== Biography ==
Clement was born in the parish of St Clement Danes and baptised at St Anne's Church, Soho. Starting as a newsagent at a young age, he soon became one of the leading vendors in London. In 1814, Clement moved into the newspaper publishing business by purchasing The Observer, at that time a comparatively obscure Sunday paper. Within two years, Clement accepted government funds in return for providing editorial support. Endeavoring to make The Observer the leading Sunday newspaper, Clement delayed printing the paper until between four and five o'clock on the Sunday morning in order to include the latest news. Yet the paper remained dependent on government funds, with nearly half of its print run given away for free as 'specimen copies'.

During this time Clement was also the publisher of the Weekly Political Register, which was edited by William Cobbett. He stood by Cobbett when the latter man left for the United States on the suspension of the Habeas Corpus Act in 1817. Three years later, Clement sold the Weekly Political Register and his newsvending business to W. H. Smith. He then bought the Morning Chronicle on the death of James Perry in 1821 for £42,000, raising most of the purchase money by bills. The transaction involved him with Messrs. Hurst & Robinson, the publishers, and their bankruptcy in 1825 hit him very hard. After losing annually on the Morning Chronicle, Clement sold it to John Easthope in 1834 for £16,500. More profitable for Clement was his ownership of Bell's Life in London, which he purchased between 1824 and 1825. Under the editorship of Vincent George Dowling, Bell's Life in London became a leading sporting paper, with its circulation growing from 3,000 to over 30,000 in the first two decades of Clement's ownership.

Clement died suddenly of apoplexy at Hackney on 24 January 1852. He is buried at Kensal Green Cemetery.
