= Alfred Septimus Dowling =

British law reporter

Alfred Septimus Dowling (1805–1868) was a British law reporter.

== Biography ==
Dowling was the fourth son of Vincent Dowling (1756–1825) of Queen's County, Ireland, but was probably born in London. He was the brother of Vincent George Dowling and Sir James Dowling.

He was called to the bar at Gray's Inn on 18 June 1828, and became a special pleader in the common law courts, and also went the home circuit. He was admitted a member of Serjeant's Inn on 12 November 1842, and made a judge of county courts, circuit No. 15, Yorkshire, by Lord Chancellor Cottenham on 9 November 1849. On 20 August 1853 he was gazetted one of the commissioners for inquiring into the state and practice of the county courts.

He died of an internal cancer at his residence, 34 Acacia Road, St. John's Wood, London, on 3 March 1868, aged 63. His widow, Bertha Eliza, died on 25 March 1880, aged 67.

== Publications ==
Downling's works includes:

1. A Collection of Statutes passed 11 George IV and 1 William IV, 1830–2, 2 vols.
2. A Collection of Statutes passed 2 William IV and 3 William IV, 1833.
3. Reports of Cases in the King's Bench, Common Pleas, and Exchequer, 1833–8, 9 vols.
4. Reports of Cases in Continuation of the above, by A. Dowling and Vincent Dowling, 1843–4, 2 vols.
5. Reports of Cases in Continuation of the above, by A. S. Dowling and John James Lowndes, 1845–51, 7 vols.

On some of the title-pages only the name A. Dowling is found.
