= Edward Fitzgibbon =

Irish writer

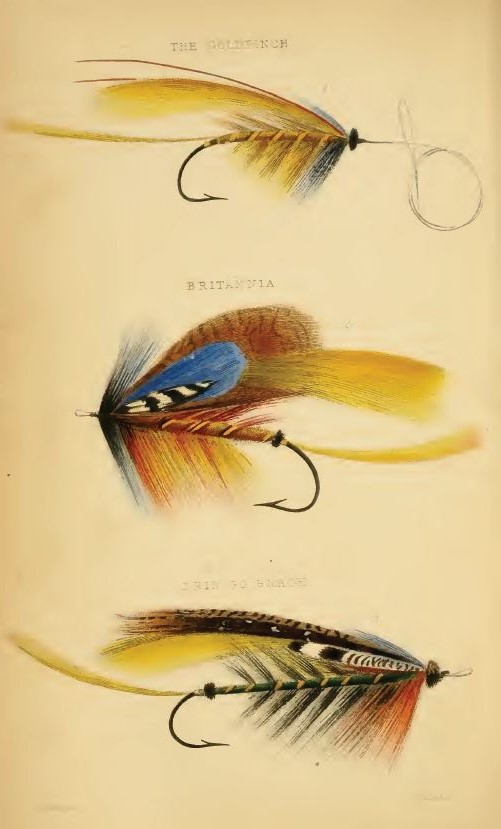
Page from The Book of Salmon by Edward Fitzgibbon

Edward Fitzgibbon (1803–1857) was an Irish writer, using the pseudonym Ephemera.

== Life ==
The son of a land agent, Fitzgibbon was born at Limerick in 1803. He was devotedly attached to fishing from boyhood. He came to London when he was 14, after his father died. At 16 he became apprentice to a surgeon in the city, but left the profession in disgust two years later and became a classical tutor in various parts of England for three years, finding time where ever he could to practise his favourite sport. He then visited Marseille, where he remained for six years, devoting himself to politics and the French language and literature, and becoming a welcome guest in literary and polite circles. Having taken some part in the revolution of 1830, he returned to England and recommended himself to the notice of John Black, the editor of The Morning Chronicle. Being admitted to the staff, he worked with success in the gallery of the House of Commons. For a long series of years he wrote on angling for 'Bell's Life in London,' his knowledge of the subject and the attractive style in which his articles were written giving them great celebrity. For twenty-eight years he was a diligent worker for the daily press. His 'Lucid Intervals of a Lunatic' was a paper which at the time obtained much attention. He wrote often for The Observer, and was a theatrical critic of considerable acumen.

Fitzgibbon made a great impression upon all who knew him by the brilliancy of his gifts. He possessed unblemished integrity, a kind and liberal disposition, much fire and eloquence, and the power of attaching to him many friends. From 1830 to the time of his death his writings had given a marvellous impulse to the art of fishing, had caused a great improvement in the manufacture and sale of fishing tackle, and largely increased the rents received by the owners of rivers and proprietors of fishing rights. He once killed fifty-two salmon and grilse on the River Shin in fifty-five hours of fishing. His 'Handbook of Angling' (1847), which reached a third edition in 1853, is perhaps the very best of the enormous number of manuals on fishing which are extant. Besides it Fitzgibbon wrote, in conjunction with Shipley of Ashbourne, 'A True Treatise on the Art of Fly-fishing as practised on the Dove and the Principal Streams of the Midland Counties,' 1838; and 'The Book of the Salmon,' together with A. Young, who added to it many notes on the life-history of this fish, 1850. 'Ephemera' regarded this as the acme of his teachings on fishing. He also edited and partly rewrote the section on 'Angling' in Elaine's 'Encyclopædia of Rural Sports' (1852), and published the best of all the practical editions of 'The Compleat Angler' of Walton and Cotton in 1853.

== Death ==
With his fine genius, excellent classical attainments, and perfect knowledge of French, Fitzgibbon would have been more famous but for an unfortunate weakness. He had periodical fits of drinking. Physicians viewed his case with much interest, as his weakness seemed almost to amount to a kind of monomania, in the intervals of which his life was marked by abstemiousness and refined tastes. Fitzgibbon often promised that he would write his experiences of intoxication, which his friends persuaded themselves would have won him fame. But he became a wreck some years before his death, on 19 November 1857, after a month's illness. He died in the communion of the Roman Catholic Church leaving no family.

He was buried in the dissenters section on the western side of Highgate Cemetery (plot no.8437). The grave, which no longer has a headstone, is adjacent to the boundary wall up from the grave of Michael Faraday.
