= Berrima Gaol =

Prison in New South Wales, 1839–2020

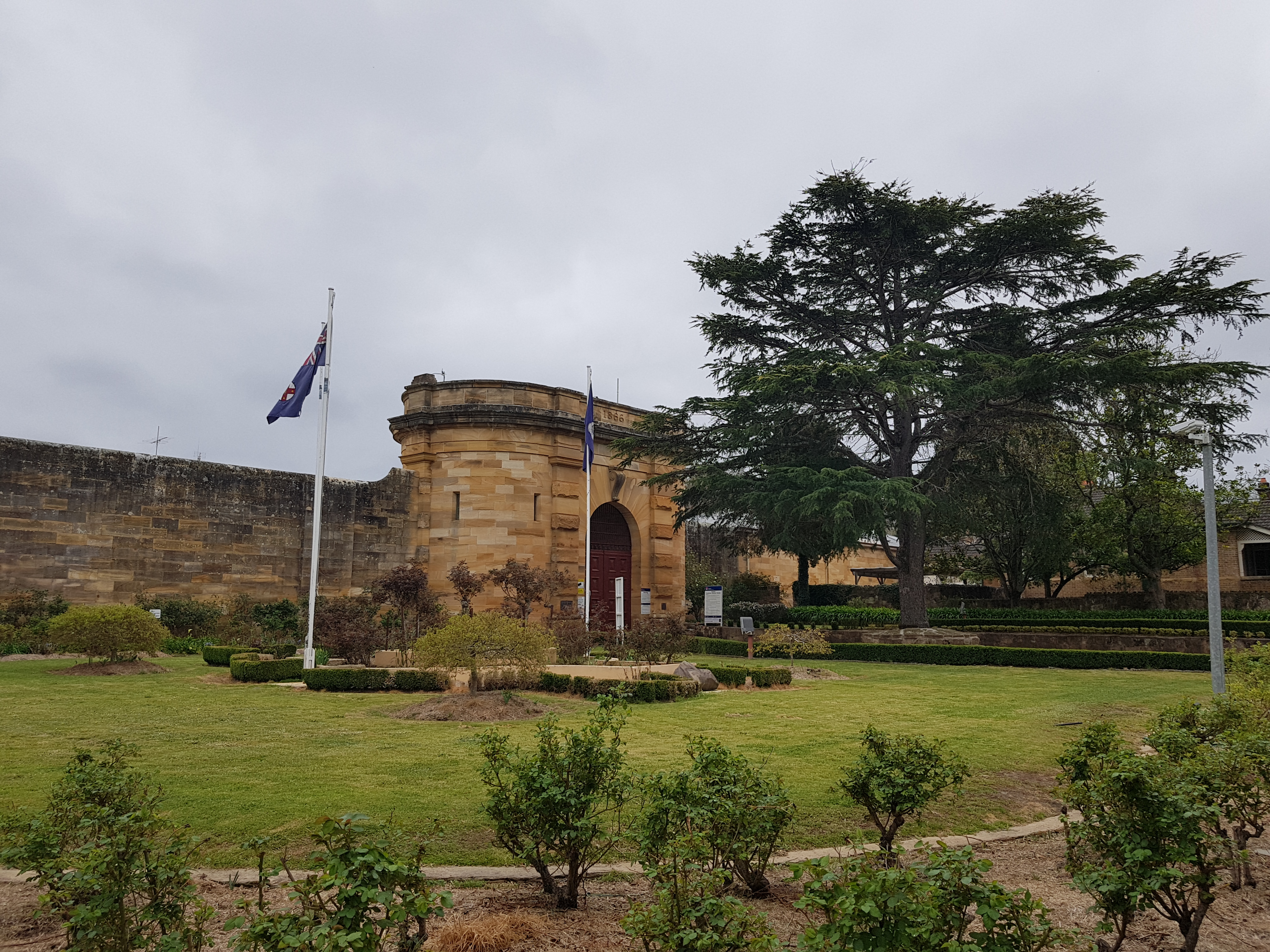
- Eastern wall and gatehouse built in the 1860s
- Interactive map of Berrima Gaol
- Location: Berrima, New South Wales; 34°29′15″S 150°20′08″E
- Status: Closed
- Opened: 1839
- Closed: 2020
- Former name: Berrima Gaol; Berrima Internment Camp; Berrima Prison Camp; Berrima Training Centre; Berrima Correctional Complex; Berrima Correctional Centre
- Building details

Technical details
- Material: Sandstone and brick

Design and construction
- Architect: James Barnet
- Architecture firm: Colonial Architect of New South Wales

Register of the National Estate
- Designated: 21 March 1978

New South Wales Heritage Register
- Official name: Berrima Correctional Centre
- Designated: 2 April 1999
- Reference no.: 00807

Berrima Gaol is a heritage-listed former prison in Berrima, New South Wales. Established in 1839, it was used for a variety of prison and internment purposes until its final closure in 2020, at which point it was the oldest Australian correctional facility in operation. The site was subsequently sold to a Sydney property developer in 2022.

== History ==
=== Planning, construction and initial use (1830–1847) ===
==== Planning and design ====
A town plan for Berrima, including a courthouse and a prison, was prepared in 1830 by Robert Hoddle in his capacity as assistant to Surveyor General Sir Thomas Mitchell. The plan, which anticipated Berrima becoming the principal town in the area, was approved by Governor Bourke in 1831. Subsequently, a design for Berrima was drawn up by the Colonial Architect's Office. This design was strongly influenced by the Society for the Improvement of Prison Discipline, who advocated for a panopticon approach to prison architecture.

==== Construction ====
In 1834, a contract for the construction of Berrima Gaol was awarded to former convict James Gough in partnership with John Richards. Due to slow progress, new contractors were sought in 1836. The work was undertaken by convict labour iron gangs, and was completed in 1839. The finished prison comprised three wings radiating from a central building, each containing 14 cells, all surrounded by a stone wall 4.3 m (14 ft) high.

==== Initial use ====
The newly constructed prison was put into use immediately. In October 1839, Berrima Gaol saw its first prison break when two cattle duffers escaped. Up until 1844, several inmates of Berrima Gaol were executed by hanging. These included the Irish-Australian serial killer John Lynch, bushranger Patrick ‘Paddy’ Curran, and the only woman ever hanged at Berrima, Lucretia Dunkley, who was sentenced to death for mariticide.

==== 1850s decline ====
Goulburn Gaol, located 60 kilometres to the south-west, opened in 1847 and quickly supplanted Berrima Gaol as the principal prison of the area. As a consequence, funding for the operation of Berrima Gaol as a prison was withdrawn.

=== Use as a separate system model prison (1860–1890) ===
==== 1860s renovation ====
Increasing pressures on the criminal justice system meant that Berrima Gaol did not permanently close after Goulburn Gaol opened. Instead, the colonial government formally re-proclaimed Berrima Gaol in 1859 and appointed a new gaoler in 1860. This was followed by substantial renovations, completed in 1866, which included new cells, yards and watch towers, and a new hospital, kitchen, bakehouse, school room and gaoler's residence. However, the most lasting legacy of the 1860s renovation was an expansion of the outer walls, which were raised by 1.5 m (5 ft), and augmented with a new eastern wall and gatehouse.

==== Separate system operation ====
Following the renovations, most of Berrima Gaol was operated as a separate system model prison for "refractory" detainees, due to it being the only prison at the time where the colonial authorities could fully implement solitary confinement. Rather than merely serving the Southern Highlands area as it had in its first incarnation, prisoners whose sentence met certain duration thresholds were now initially transferred into Berrima Gaol from across New South Wales to undergo separate treatment for several months, and then afterwards returned to other prisons for the remainder of their sentence. Two cramped, completely dark cells were reserved for sensory deprivation punishment of the most insubordinate of prisoners.

==== 1878 royal commission ====
Berrima Gaol soon developed a fearsome reputation. In 1878, a royal commission was appointed to investigate the management and discipline of the prison, prompted by reports of excessively cruel discipline meted out by William Small Jr, the gaoler since 1863. The royal commission described Small as a "severe disciplinarian" and found that some unjustifiable instances of excessive punishment had occurred under his command, but the commissioners were unable to substantiate many of the allegations made against his governorship and ultimately made no recommendation against him. Subsequently, Small continued in his posting at Berrima for several years until he was promoted and replaced as gaoler in the mid-1880s.

=== Site expansion and prison reforms (1890–1909) ===
==== Construction of governor's residence ====
During the 1890s additional lands around the prison were added to the site, and in 1898 a new residence for the governor of the prison was built beyond the outer walls. Construction of a deputy governor's residence followed soon afterwards, while further works on the cellblocks happened at the same time.

==== Neitenstein's reforms ====
Meanwhile, in 1896 Captain Frederick William Neitenstein was appointed Comptroller-General of Prisons. A reformer, Neitenstein moved away from past prison practices towards a focus on reducing recidivism. To this end, from October 1897 prisoners at Berrima Gaol were no longer allowed to associate during mealtimes, increasing orderliness, and were put to work in skill-based labour such as tailoring, shoemaking and agriculture. Moreover, the more coercive aspects of prison punishment for which Berrima Gaol was known, such as confinement in dark cells, were wound back.

Neitenstein retired from his office as Comptroller-General in 1909, having overseen a substantial reduction in the prison population of New South Wales. In the same year, Berrima Gaol was deemed surplus to requirements and once again closed as a cost-reduction exercise, saving £4,000 per annum. (Note: equivalent to A$635,000 in 2022 when adjusted via CPI or A$863,000 in 2022 when adjusted via GDP deflation)

=== Non-correctional uses (1909–1942) ===
==== Rabbit knackery ====
After its closure, Berrima Gaol was used as a knackery for invasive introduced rabbits. From this facility a wide variety of commercial byproducts were produced, mostly for export to the German Empire. However, the rabbit processing works at Berrima Gaol was short-lived.

==== Internment camp during WWI ====
Following the outbreak of the First World War in 1914, the newly elected Third Fisher ministry passed the War Precautions Act 1914 through Parliament, which cut off trade with enemy states and enabled the internment of enemy aliens. Berrima Gaol became one of several internment camps established in New South Wales, operating a satellite of the main Holsworthy Internment Camp. The first internees arrived in early 1915. They numbered around 300, mostly civilian officers from the German merchant marine, along with some prisoners-of-war from the Imperial German Navy light cruiser SMS Emden and from occupied German New Guinea. The internees were given considerable autonomy, being allowed free roam outside the walls within a 3 km (2 mi) radius during the day until the evening roll-call at half-past six. Accordingly, many of the internees passed the time on the banks of the nearby Wingecarribee River, where they built gardens, huts, marinas, boats and a bridge.

==== Tourist attraction during interwar period ====
With the First World War over, by the end of 1919 all internees had left Berrima, and the building again became unused. During the subsequent interwar period, it was leased out to a returned serviceman, who operated the gaol as a tourist attraction.

==== Fire during WWII ====
The advent of the Second World War saw a need to requisition Berrima Gaol again, this time for use as an Australian Army supply depot. In July 1942, shortly after its conversion for this purpose, an uncontrollable fire broke out. Almost all the buildings were gutted, with only stonework surviving.

=== Post-war reuse as a prison (1944–2011) ===
==== 1940s reconstruction ====
Following the fire, the NSW Government decide to reconstruct Berrima Gaol using prisoner labour again, to relieve overcrowding at other facilities. To this end, the site was re-proclaimed as the Berrima Prison Camp in September 1944, thirty-five years after its last use as a state prison. As part of the works, almost all structures within the prison walls were demolished and rebuilt to a new design, with the exception of the original interior 1839 gateway. Construction was completed in 1949, after five years work by a prison labour gang of less than 30. At this point the prison was reclassified as the Berrima Training Centre, intended to rehabilitate prisoners by teaching them practical trade skills.

==== Berrima Correctional Complex ====
In 1997, the prison was renamed by proclamation from Berrima Training Centre to Berrima Correctional Complex. The building was listed on the New South Wales State Heritage Register on 2 April 1999. After one hundred and sixty six years as a men's prison, it changed into a medium security women's prison in 2001.

==== 2011 closure ====
In the 2011 NSW State Budget, the Government announced that the prison would be closed, which took effect on 4 November 2011. Immediately prior to its closure in 2011, it was an all-female low-to-medium-security prison, and was responsible for the administration of a periodic detention centre and court cells at Wollongong.

=== Final years as a prison (2016–2021) ===
==== Berrima Correctional Centre ====
The Berrima Correctional Centre was temporarily re-opened on 27 September 2016 as part of a statewide initiative to add 1400 beds to the New South Wales prison population. It was expected to house 75 minimum security prisoners.

In 2019, the correctional centre became the centre of a scandal. A prison officer, Colin Kelleher, was arrested and later found guilty of having a romantic relationship with an inmate, Kim Quach. He was suspended and given a 12 month community corrective order.

==== 2020 closure ====
By 2020, the Berrima Correctional Centre was the oldest Australian correctional facility still in operation, was no longer fit-for-purpose and had become surplus to the needs of Corrective Services NSW. The correctional centre was formally decommissioned in March 2021, having been inoperative since the previous April. In 2022, the site was sold to a property developer.

== Proposed re-development ==
Following the sale by the NSW Coalition Government in May 2022, the Sydney property developer, Blue Sox Investments, applied for development via the State Significant Development process. Blue Sox released early details of its plans in early 2024.

The property developer has a project website with its design concept which includes:

- Construction of 60 hotels units outside the walls on bank of the Wingecarribee River;
- demolition of the 1949 cells;
- a 3-storey carpark;
- function centre; restaurant; and wellness centre.

Plans also include cutting three holes into the eastern street-facing wall (see image in photo gallery).

Some concerned residents formed a group, Berrima Heritage Matters, which is against any development outside the walls and has a proposal for future use of the site.

The Berrima Residents Association, a longtime advocate for the heritage values of Berrima village, supported a community-based bid during the Expression of Interest phase of the NSW Government's sale process but was unsuccessful. The proposal was that "the property be retained by the community and re-purposed as a significant cultural, economic and social asset and open to the public as a significant tourist destination".

== Photo gallery ==
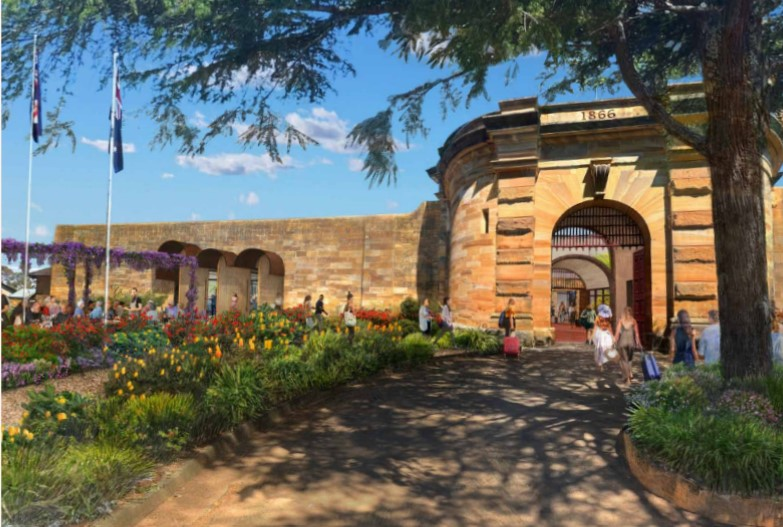
A Sydney property developer plans to re-develop Berrima Gaol. Plans include cutting three large holes into the front wall

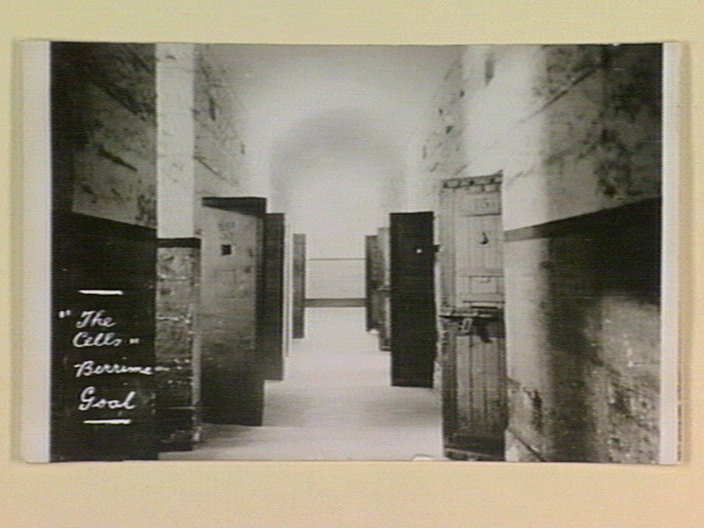
Cellblock

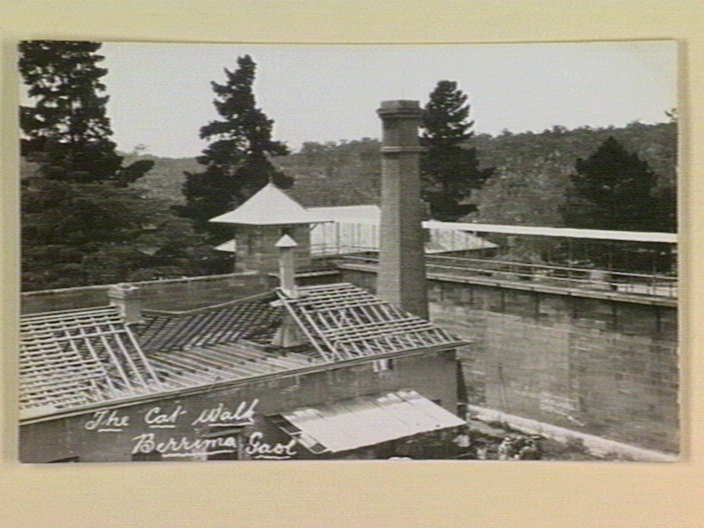
Prison yards and catwalk

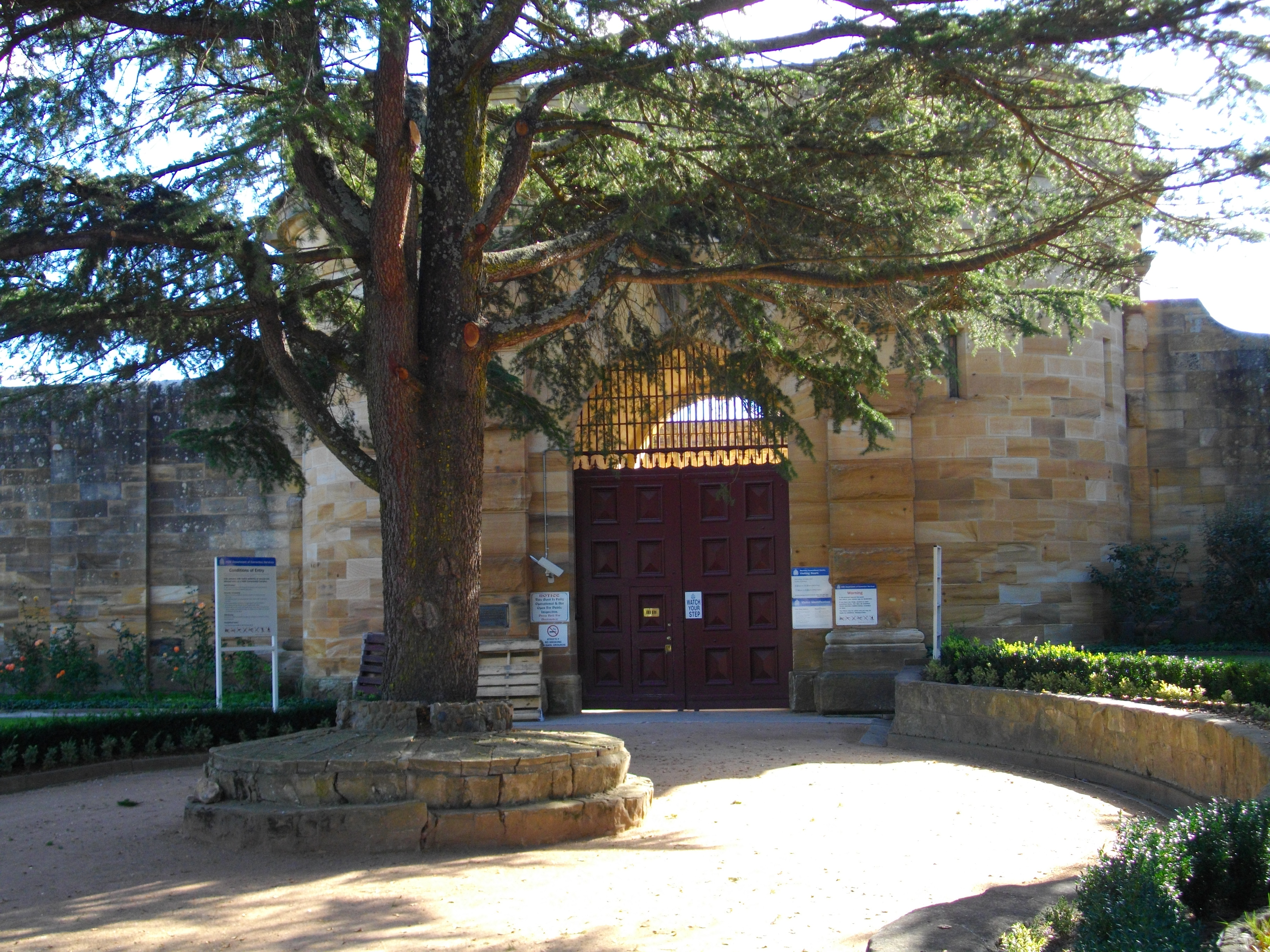
The old Berrima Gaol was, in its latter days, a training centre for female convicts

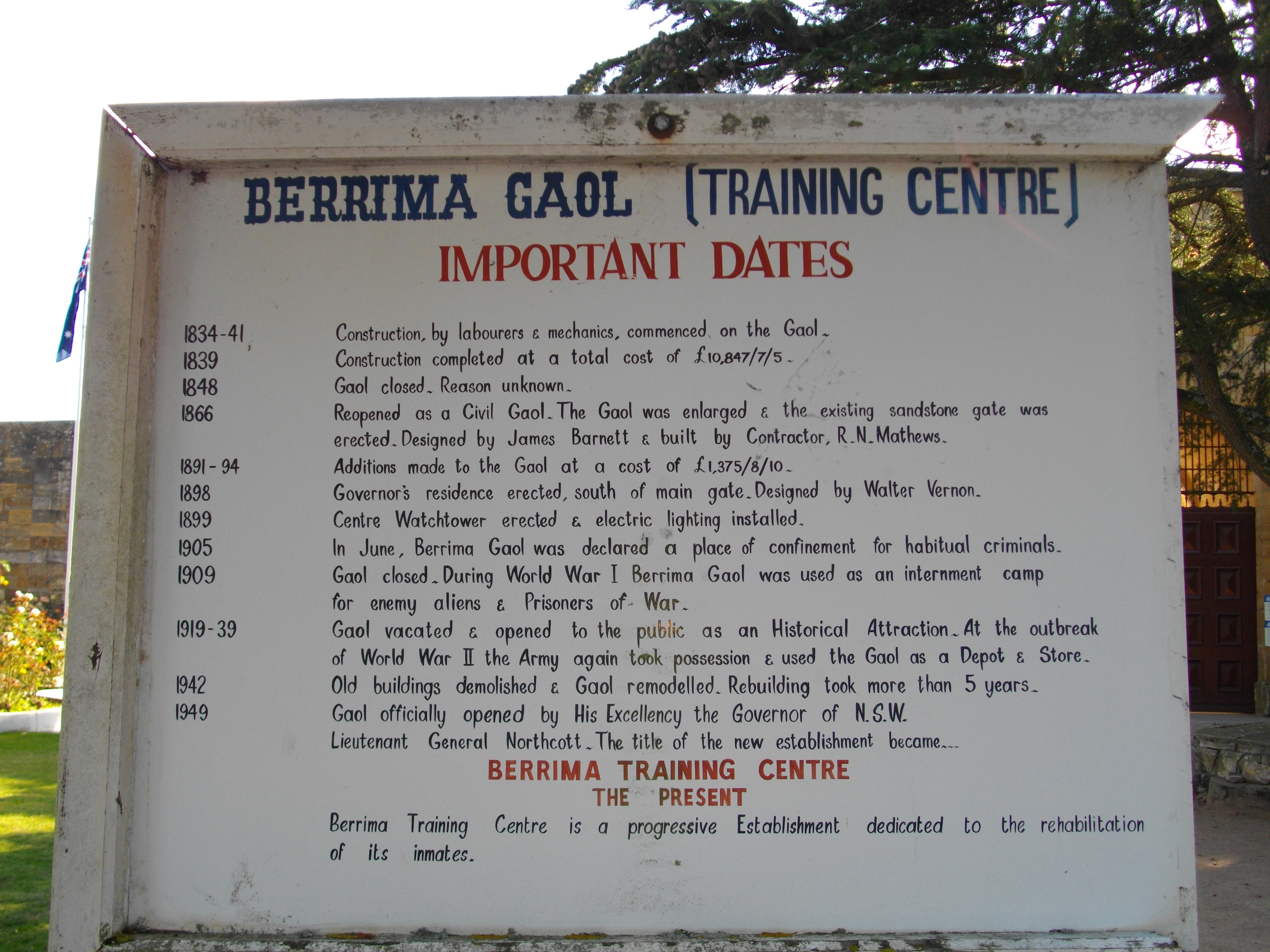
This notice outside the building outlines the jail's historical timeline

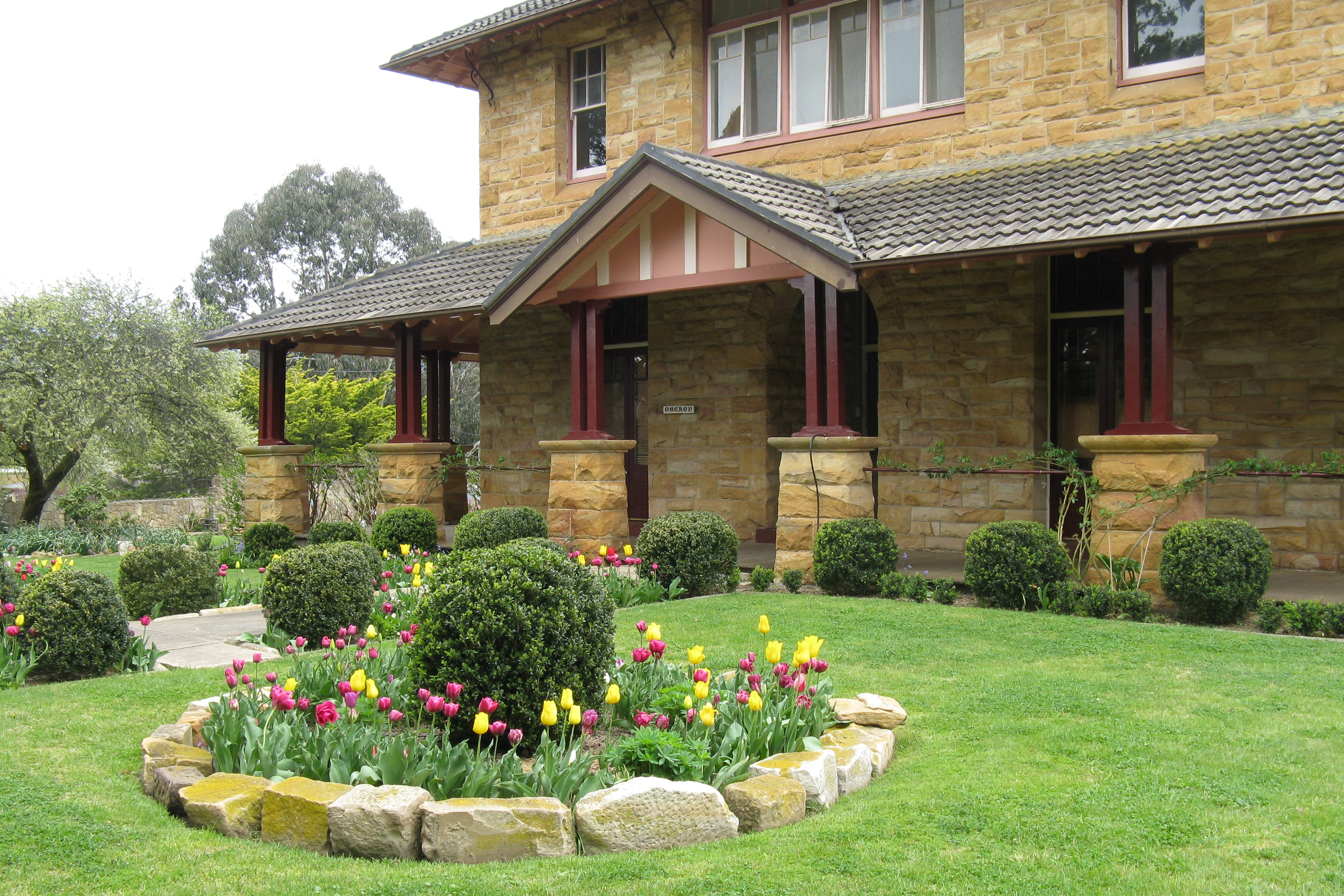
Governor's Residence

== See also ==
- Punishment in Australia
