= Charles Henry Newmarch =

English cleric and author

Charles Henry Newmarch (1824–1903) was an English cleric and author.

== Life ==
Born at Burford, Oxfordshire, on 30 March 1824, he was second son of George Newmarch, a solicitor of Cirencester, and Mary his wife. After education from March 1837 at Rugby School, he spent some time in the merchant shipping service and in Eastern travel. Then settling in Cirencester, Newmarch became interested in the antiquities of the neighbourhood, He was the main founder in 1851 the Cirencester and Swindon Express, which was soon amalgamated with the Wilts and Gloucester Standard. He became joint editor of that paper, and till the end of his life was a regular contributor under the name of "Rambler".

Newmarch matriculated at Corpus Christi College, Cambridge, in 1851, graduating B.A. in 1855. He was ordained deacon in 1854, priest in 1855, and served as curate at Brockworth. He was from 1856 to 1893 rector of Wardley-cum-Belton, Rutland; and was rural dean of the district from 1857 to 1867. He was interested in agricultural matters, contributing to Bell's Life in London on the subject; he championed the cause of the village labourers, who took his part against Joseph Arch, when Arch visited Belton in his tour of the village districts in 1872. He took an active part in church building in Rutland, and restored the chancel of his parish church.

Deafness led to Newmarch's retirement in 1893 to 37 Upper Grosvenor Road, Tunbridge Wells, where he died on 14 June 1903. A tablet to his memory was erected in Belton church in 1912.

== Works ==
Newmarch wrote:

- Five Years in the East (1847) under the pseudonym R. N. Hutton
- Recollections of Rugby, by an old Rugbeian (1848), anonymous
- Jealousy (1848, 3 vols.), novel
- Illustrations of the Remains of Roman Art in Cirencester (1850, 2nd edit. 1851), with James Buckman
- Newmarch Pedigree (1868), with his elder brother George Frederick Newmarch.

== Family ==
Newmarch married on 6 February 1855, at Leckhampton, Anne Straford of Cheltenham and Charlton Kings, third daughter of J. C. Straford. They had two sons and three daughters; one daughter survived him.
