= Francis Frederick Brandt =

English barrister and author

Francis Frederick Brandt (1819, Gawsworth Rectory, Cheshire – 6 December 1874, 8 Figtree Court, Temple, London) was an English barrister and author.

Brandt was eldest son of the Rev. Francis Brandt, rector of Aldford, Cheshire, 1843–50, who died in 1870, and Ellinor, second daughter of Nicholas Grimshaw of Preston, Lancashire. He was educated at Macclesfield grammar school, entered at the Inner Temple in 1839, and practised for some years as a special pleader. Called to the bar at the Inner Temple on 30 April 1847, he took the North Wales and Chester circuit. He was a successful and popular leader of the Chester and Knutsford sessions, had a fair business in London, especially as an arbitrator or referee, was one of the revising barristers on his circuit, and was employed for many years as a reporter for the Times in the common pleas. About 1864 he was offered and declined an Indian judgeship.

In his earlier days he was a writer in magazines and in Bell's Life. The first of his books appeared in 1857, and was entitled Habet! a Short Treatise on the Law of the Land as it affects Pugilism, in which he attempted to show that prize-fighting was not of itself illegal. His next work was a novel called Frank Morland's Manuscripts, or Memoirs of a Modern Templar, 1859, which was followed by Fur and Feathers, the Law of the Land relating to Game, &c., 1859, Suggestions for the Amendment of the Game Laws, 1862, and Games, Gaming, and Gamesters' Law, 1871, a book of considerable legal and antiquarian research, which reached a second edition.

He died at his chambers, having suffered much from a neuralgic complaint, and was buried at Christ Church, Todmorden. He was a zealous and efficient member of the Inns of Court Rifle Corps. Brandt was never married.
