= Dunvegan Castle (1819 ship) =

History

United Kingdom
- Name: Dunvegan Castle
- Namesake: Dunvegan Castle
- Owner: Finlay & Co.
- Builder: James Macrae, Chittagong
- Launched: 5 October 1819
- Fate: Lost in 1837

General characteristics
- Tons burthen: 446, or 44630/94 (bm)
- Length: 109 ft 7 in (33.4 m)
- Beam: 30 ft 4 in (9.2 m)
- Propulsion: Sail

Dunvegan Castle was a merchant ship built at Chittagong in British India in 1819. She made two voyages transporting convicts from England and Ireland to Australia. She also transported troops at least twice, once to Burma (1824) and once to Spain (1835). She was lost in 1837.

== Career ==
In 1824, Dunvegan Castle was one of the transports belonging to the second division of the Madras Force participating in the First Anglo-Burmese War.

On 4 July 1828, she sailed to Mauritius and Ceylon under a license from the British East India Company.

On her first convict voyage, under the command of William Walmsley and with surgeon Robert Dunn, she departed Sheerness on 30 September 1829. She stopped at Hobart Town and arrived in Sydney on 30 March 1830. She embarked 180 male convicts and there were five convict deaths en route.

On her second convict voyage, under the command of John Duff and with surgeon Patrick McTernan, she departed Dublin, Ireland on 1 July 1832, and arrived in Sydney on 16 October 1832. She embarked 200 male convicts and had no deaths en route.

In early 1836, she sailed to Spain with some 150 troops of the British Auxiliary Legion. The Legion was a unit of volunteers that went to Spain to support the Liberals and Queen Isabella II of Spain against the Carlists in the First Carlist War.

== Fate ==
She was last listed in Lloyd's Register in 1836, with Dawhiney, master, G. Clark, owner, and trade Falmouth–Newcastle. The entry is marked "LOST".

She was wrecked on 25 April 1837, on the Lemon Sand, Yarmouth. She was on a voyage from South Shields, County Durham to Demerara.

== Notable people transported aboard ==
- Mortimer Lewis
- John Lynch (serial killer)
