= Frank Lewis Dowling =

British newspaper editor

Frank Lewis Dowling (18 October 1823 – 10 October 1867, in Norfolk Street, Strand, London) was a British newspaper editor.

Dowling was the son of Vincent George Dowling and was most likely born in London. He was called to the bar at the Middle Temple on 24 November‌ 1848. He took over the editorship of Bell's Life in London after the previous editor, his father, became ill in 1851. He was known for his urbanity, and for the fair manner in which he discharged the duties of arbitrator and umpire in numerous boxing disputes. He managed arrangements for the international fight between Thomas Sayers and John C. Heenan on 17 April 1860, and it was on his advice that the combatants agreed to consider it a drawn battle and each received a belt.

He married Frances Harriet on 29 October 1853, the fourth daughter of Benjamin Humphrey Smart of 55 Connaught Terrace, Hyde Park, London.

He edited and brought out the annual issues of Fistiana, or the Oracle of the Ring, from 1852 to 1864, as well as preparing a further edition which did not appear until a year after his death.

He died of tuberculosis at his lodgings.
