= James Dowling =

Australian politician (1787–1844)

Sir James Dowling
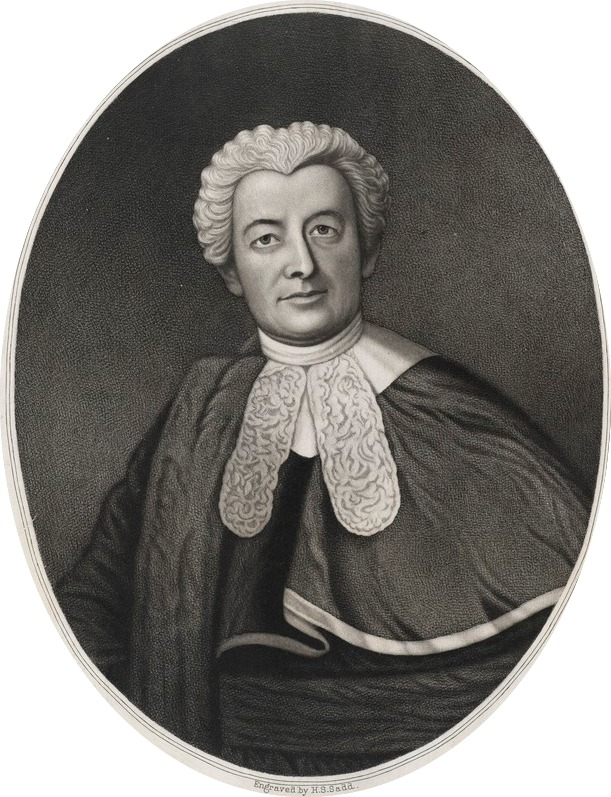
- Sir James Dowling

Chief Justice of New South Wales
- In office 1837–1844
- Preceded by: Sir Francis Forbes
- Succeeded by: Sir Alfred Stephen

Personal details
- Born: 25 November 1787 London, England
- Died: 27 September 1844 (aged 56) Woolloomooloo, New South Wales
- Resting place: Devonshire Street Cemetery; Waverley Cemetery
- Occupation: Jurist

Sir James Dowling (25 November 1787 – 27 September 1844) was an English-born Australian jurist in New South Wales, Chief Justice of New South Wales 1837 – 1844.

== Early life ==
James Dowling was born in London, England, the son of Vincent Dowling (1756–1825) of Queen's County, Ireland, and brother of Alfred Septimus Dowling (1805–1868), a British law reporter, Vincent George Dowling, & 2 other brothers.

== Career ==
Following the brutal killing of 28 unarmed Aboriginal peoples in the Myall Creek massacre on 10 June 1838, Dowling presided over the first trial in which a jury acquitted eleven colonists of the murder of one person, referred to as Daddy. Dowling also sat in the Full Bench which determined questions of law following the conviction of seven colonists of the murder of two children and an adult referred to as Charley.

== Personal life and death ==
At the time of his death, Dowling was preparing a volume of law reports of the decisions of the Supreme Court of New South Wales. The volume was eventually published in 2005. Many of these cases are also online.

South Dowling Street in Sydney is named after him.

== See also ==
- List of judges of the Supreme Court of New South Wales

== Sources ==
- T.D. Castle and Bruce Kercher (eds), Dowling's Select Cases, 1828 to 1844: Decisions of the Supreme Court of New South Wales (Francis Forbes Society for Australian Legal History, Sydney, 2005).

Legal offices
Preceded by Sir Francis Forbes	Chief Justice of New South Wales; 1837–1844	Succeeded by Sir Alfred Stephen
