= Henry Hall Dixon =

English sporting writer (1822–1870)

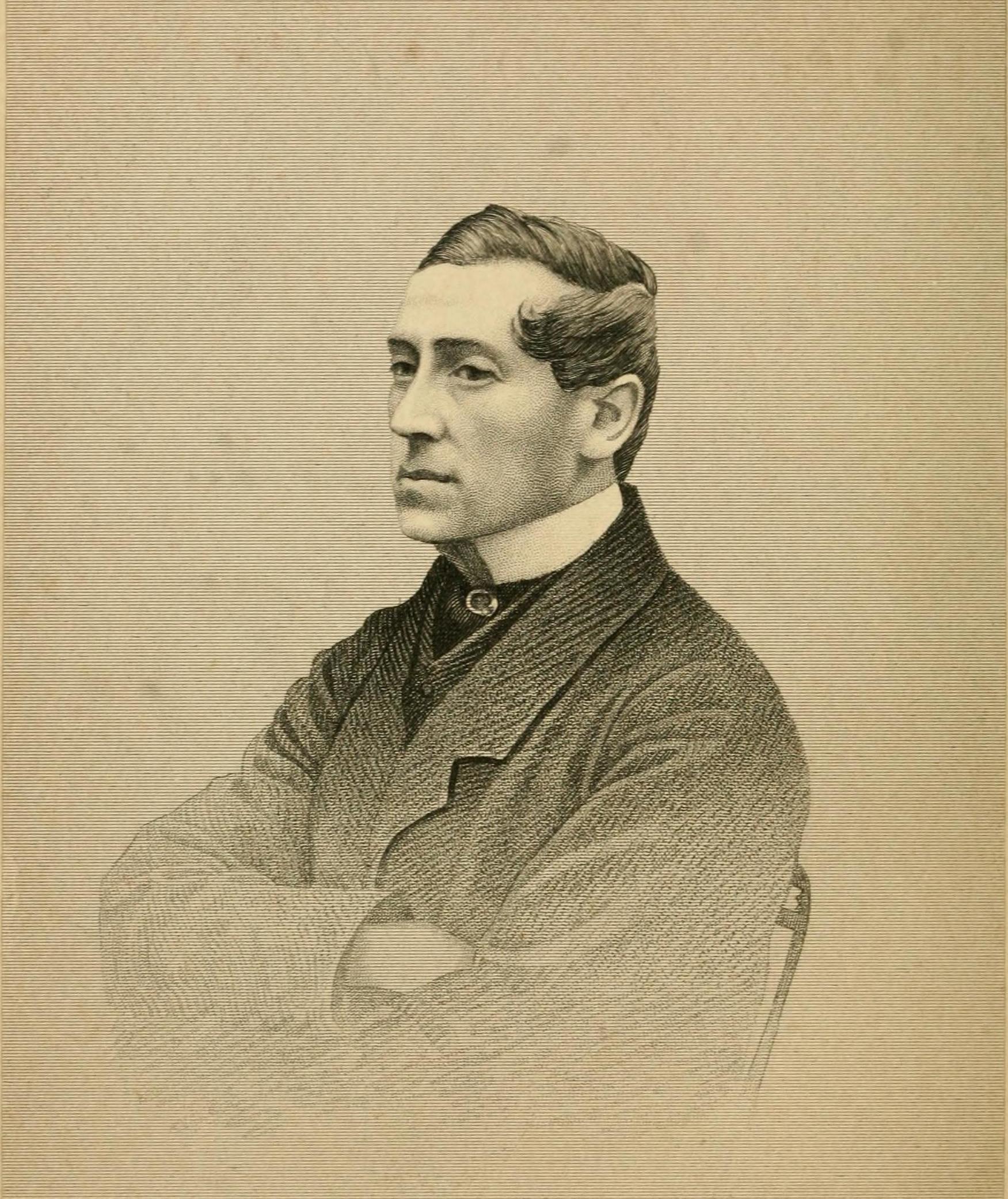

Henry Hall Dixon (16 May 1822 – 16 March 1870) was an English sporting writer known by his pen name, "The Druid".

== Life ==
Henry Hall Dixon was born at Warwick Bridge, Cumberland, on 16 May 1822. He was the second son of Sarah Rebecca and Peter Dixon. He was educated at Rugby School and at Trinity College, Cambridge, from which he graduated in 1846. He took up the profession of the law, but, though called to the bar in 1853, soon returned to sporting journalism, in which he had already made a name for himself, and began to write regularly for The Sporting Magazine, in the pages of which appeared three of his novels, Post and Paddock (1856), Silk and Scarlet (1859), and Scott and Sebright (1862). He also published a legal compendium entitled The Law of the Farm (1858), which ran through several editions. His other more important works were Field and Fern (1865), giving an account of the herds and flocks of Scotland, and Saddle and Sirloin (1870), treating in the same manner those of England. He died at Kensington on 16 March 1870.
