= Duckmaloi Road =

Major rural road in New South Wales, Australia

Duckmaloi Road Oberon Street New South Wales
- Coordinates: 33.703710°S 149.854246°E (West end); 33.676884°S 150.050916°E (East end)

General information
- Type: Rural road
- Length: 25.7 km (16 mi)
- Gazetted: March 1950
- Maintained by: Transport for NSW, Oberon Council, City of Lithgow
- Tourist routes: Tourist Drive 1 (through Oberon)

Major junctions
- West end: Carrington Avenue; Oberon, New South Wales
- East end: Jenolan Caves Road; Hampton, New South Wales

Location(s)
- Major settlements: Duckmaloi

Duckmaloi Road (and at its western end through Oberon as Oberon Street) is a 25.7-kilometre (16.0 mi) rural road in Australia linking Oberon to Jenolan Caves Road just south of Hampton.

== Route ==
Oberon Street starts at the intersection with Carrington Avenue and North Street in central Oberon and heads east, changing name to Duckmaloi Road at the intersection with Tarana Road in eastern Oberon, before descending to cross Fish River Creek. It passes to the north of the village of Duckmaloi, then crosses the Duckmaloi River and ascends up and passes the Hampton State Forest which lies north of the road. It terminates at the intersection with Jenolan Caves Road 4 km (2.5 mi) south of Hampton.

It is fully sealed with two lanes in each direction, with the occasional overtaking lane.

== History ==
The passing of the Main Roads Act of 1924 through the Parliament of New South Wales provided for the declaration of Main Roads, roads partially funded by the State government through the Main Roads Board (later Transport for NSW). Main Road No. 558 was declared along this road on 1 March 1950, from the intersection with Oberon-Tarana Road in Oberon to the intersection with Hartley-Jenolan Caves Road near Hampton).

The passing of the Roads Act of 1993 updated road classifications and the way they could be declared within New South Wales. Under this act, Duckmaloi Road today retains its declaration as Main Road 558.

== Upgrade ==
The road has seen some upgrades in its history including:

- A new two-lane concrete bridge over the Duckmaloi River, built by the Department of Main Roads, 1963.
- A new two-lane concrete bridge over Fish River Creek, built by the Roads & Traffic Authority, 1990.
- Upgrade of the Duckmaloi River bridge, done by Roads & Maritime Services and Transport for NSW, 2019.

In 2021, then Minister for Regional Transport and Roads Paul Toole announced $1.5 million in upgrades for Duckmaloi Road including:

- vehicle-activated signs
- curve alignment markers
- improved sealed road shoulders on curves
- a full-width traversable clear zone
- roadside barriers and profile edge and centre lines

== Major intersections ==
LGA	Location	km	mi	Destinations	Notes
Oberon	Oberon	0	0.0	Carrington Avenue (Tourist Route 1 west), to O'Connell Road – Bathurst and Abercrombie Road – Goulburn	Western terminus of Oberon Street, Tourist Route 1 continues west along Carrington Avenue
Oberon	Oberon	0	0.0	North Street – Oberon, Tarana	
Oberon	Oberon	0.4	0.25	Ross Street (Tourist Route 1 south), to Edith Road – Jenolan Caves	Tourist Route 1 continues south along Edith Road
Oberon	Oberon	1.6	0.99	Tarana Road – Oberon	Eastern terminus of Oberon Street, western terminus of Duckmaloi Road
Oberon	Oberon	2.5	1.6	Albion Street – Oberon	Ring road around central Oberon
Fish River Creek		3.8	2.4	Bridge over river (name not known)	
Oberon	Oberon	5.6	3.5	Titania Road – Edith	
Oberon	Duckmaloi	12.7	7.9	Nunans Hill Road – Hazelgrove	
Duckmaloi River		14.5	9.0	Bridge over river (name not known)	
Lithgow	Hampton	25.7	16.0	Jenolan Caves Road (Tourist Route 1) – Lithgow, Katoomba, Jenolan Caves	Eastern terminus of Duckmaloi Road
1.000 mi = 1.609 km; 1.000 km = 0.621 mi: Route transition
