= Jenolan Caves Road =

Road in New South Wales, Australia

Jenolan Caves Road New South Wales
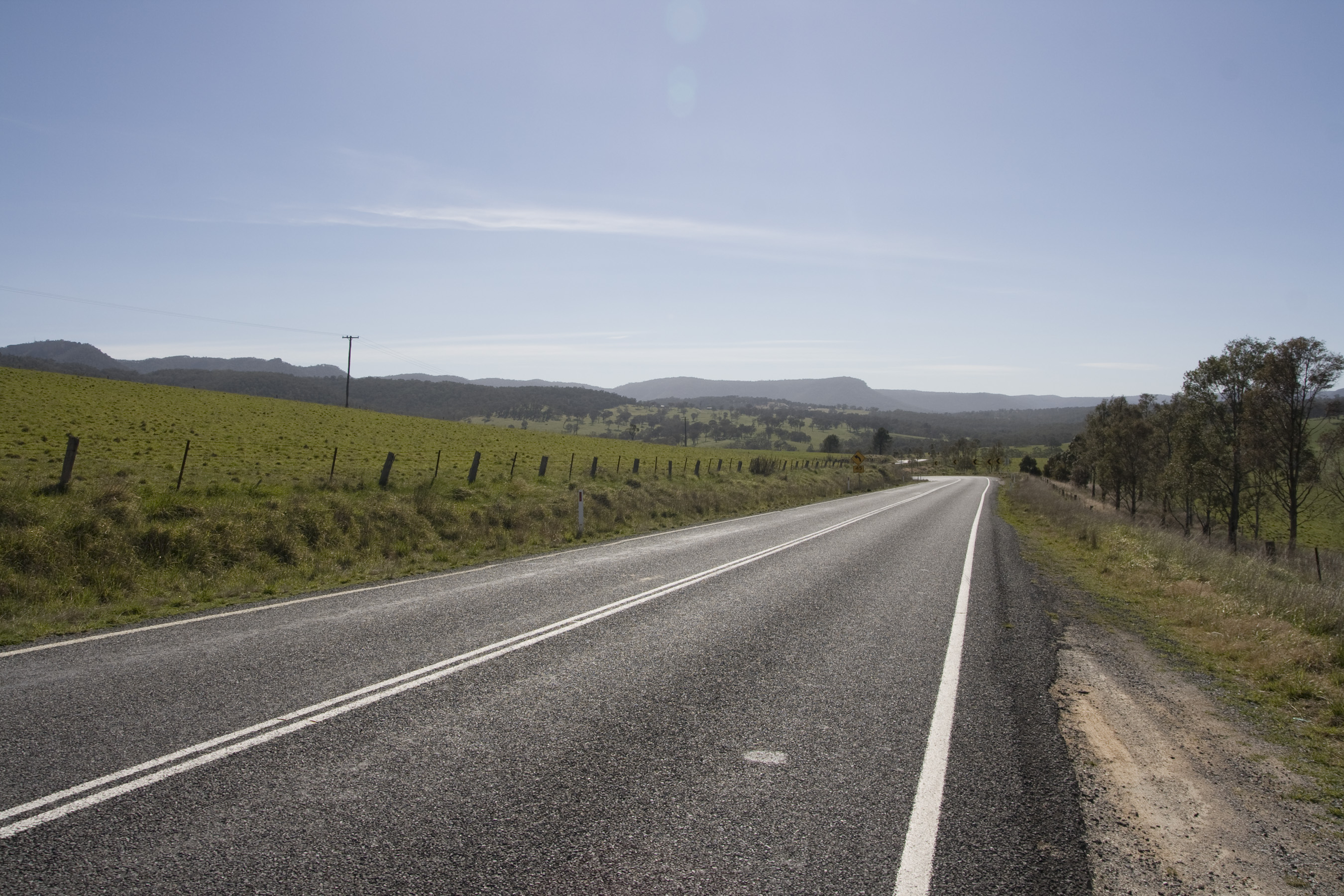
- Jenolan Caves Road, Hartley
- Coordinates: 33.542435°S 150.167072°E (Northeast end); 33.832835°S 149.998862°E (Southwest end)

General information
- Type: Rural road
- Length: 49.7 km (31 mi)
- Gazetted: August 1928
- Maintained by: Transport for NSW
- Tourist routes: Tourist Route 1

Major junctions
- Northeast end: Great Western Highway; Hartley, New South Wales
- Duckmaloi Road
- Southwest end: Edith Road; Jenolan, New South Wales

Location(s)
- Major settlements: Lowther, Hampton, Jenolan

Jenolan Caves Road is a rural road in New South Wales, Australia, linking Great Western Highway at Hartley to Edith Road at Jenolan.

The road is a part of Tourist Drive 1 linking the Blue Mountains to Bathurst via Oberon and Hampton.

== Route ==
The road starts at the intersection of the Great Western Highway and Blackmans Creek Road, then travels south and crosses the Coxs River (Glenroy Bridge). From there it travels southwest and ascends Mount Blaxland, then continues to Hampton and to the Duckmaloi Road intersection. Next it winds south to the 5-Mile section which descends to the Grand Arch. It then goes through Jenolan Caves and leads to a parking lot at Jenolan Caves House. From there it continues northwest on the 2-Mile section before turning into Edith Road at the Kanangra Walls Road intersection.

The road is fully sealed across its entire length. The road is as narrow as one lane on the 5-Mile, Grand Arch, and 2-Mile sections, but the majority of the road is two lanes wide.

== History ==
The passing of the Main Roads Act of 1924 through the Parliament of New South Wales provided for the declaration of Main Roads, roads partially funded by the State government through the Main Roads Board (MRB). Main Road No. 253 was declared along this road on 8 August 1928, from the intersection with Great Western Highway at Hartley) via Hampton to Jenolan Caves (and continuing northwest to Oberon); with the passing of the Main Roads (Amendment) Act of 1929 to provide for additional declarations of State Highways and Trunk Roads, this was amended to Main Road 253 on 8 April 1929.

The passing of the Roads Act of 1993 updated road classifications and the way they could be declared within New South Wales. Under this act, Jenolan Caves Road today retains its declaration as part of Main Road 253, from Hartley to Jenolan Caves (and continuing northwest via Oberon to Bathurst).

== Closures ==
The road has been closed several times over the years due to bushfires and landslips. Two notable closures were the section between Hampton and Jenolan Caves between January and June 2020 due to bushfire damage and landslips from heavy rain and floods, and closure of the same section in March 2021 due to landslips and parts of the road washed away due to heavy rain and flooding. On May 25, 2021, the road was reopened at Hampton with Stop / Slow restrictions. The 5-Mile section was still closed. The 2-Mile section was reopened on May 10, 2021.

== Major intersections ==
LGA	Location	km	mi	Destinations	Notes
Lithgow	Hartley	0.0	0.0	Great Western Highway (A32) – Lithgow, Mount Victoria	Northern terminus of road and Tourist Route 1
Coxs River		2.1	1.3	Glenroy Bridge	
Lithgow	Hartley	6.2	3.9	McKanes Falls Road – Lithgow	
Lithgow	Lowther	12.2	7.6	Lowther Siding Road – Little Hartley	
Lithgow	Hampton	19.4	12.1	Hampton Road – Rydal	
Lithgow	Hampton	23.7	14.7	Duckmaloi Road – Oberon	
Oberon	Jenolan	49.7	30.9	Kanangra Walls Road – Kanangra-Boyd National Park	
Oberon	Jenolan	49.7	30.9	Edith Road (Tourist Route 1) – Oberon, Bathurst	Southwestern terminus of road, Tourist Route 1 continues northwest along Edith Road
1.000 mi = 1.609 km; 1.000 km = 0.621 mi: Route transition

== See also ==
- Highways in Australia
- List of highways in New South Wales
- Fish River
