= Duckmaloi, New South Wales =

Duckmaloi
- Town
- Coordinates: 33°42′13″S 149°57′28″E
- Country: Australia
- State: New South Wales
- Region: Central West
- LGA: Oberon
- Location: 13 km (8.1 mi) E of Oberon

Government
  - State electorate: Bathurst
  - Federal division: Calare

Population
  - Total: 49 (2016 census)
- Postcode: 2787

Duckmaloi is a rural locality in the local government area of Oberon in the Central West region of New South Wales. The locality is about 13 kilometres (8.1 mi) east of the town of Oberon. The 2016 census recorded a population of 49 for the state suburb of Duckmaloi.

== Geography ==
The Duckmaloi River forms much of the eastern boundary, and the Fish River flows through from south-west to north-east where it is joined by the Duckmaloi River and forms the north-eastern boundary.

== Road infrastructure ==
Duckmaloi Road provides access to the locality from Oberon to the west and from Hampton to the east.
