= Lindlegreen Barn =

- Location within New South Wales Location within Australia
- 33°32′03″S 149°43′41″E
- Location: 2509 O'Connell Road, O'Connell, Oberon Shire, New South Wales, Australia

History
- Built: 1827

Site notes
- Architect: Thomas Hassall

New South Wales Heritage Register
- Official name: The Lindlegreen Barn; Hassall Barn
- Type: State heritage (built)
- Designated: 24 August 2018
- Reference no.: 2012
- Type: Barn
- Category: Farming and Grazing
- Builders: John Barker

Lindlegreen Barn is a heritage-listed former Aboriginal land, farm and barn and now shed at 2509 O'Connell Road, O'Connell, Oberon Shire, New South Wales, Australia. It was designed by Thomas Hassall and built during 1827 by John Barker. It is also known as The Lindlegreen Barn and Hassall Barn. It was added to the New South Wales State Heritage Register on 24 August 2018.

== History ==
=== O'Connell Region ===
O'Connell is believed to have one of the highest concentrations of earth buildings in Australia, with some structures dating back to the early 1800s. (Note: The following is extracted from the nomination by Angus McKibbin and a 2010 report by Christo Atiken, Heritage Advisor to Oberon Shire Council, as well as the Australian Dictionary of Biography entry for Thomas Hassall.)

Lindlegreen is part of the 324-hectare (800-acre) farm granted to Reverend Thomas Hassall by Governor Brisbane in June 1823. The land was in part a fulfillment of a grant made to Hassall by Governor Macquarie in 1818, but not surveyed or registered. Hassall called his farm Lampeter, or Llambeda, after the theological college in Wales where he studied.

Hassall was born in Coventry, England in 1794 and travelled with his parents to Tahiti in 1796 and, subsequently, Sydney in 1798. Hassall was son of missionary Rowland Hassall, preacher and landholder in the Dundas and Parramatta areas after the arrival of the family in the colony. The Hassall family had a close association with Samuel Marsden and were involved in early itinerant ministries in the Sydney area. In May 1813 Thomas Hassall opened the first Sunday school in Australia in his father's house. This venture was so successful that Hassall senior, John Eyre, and other leading Dissenters and Methodist formed the NSW Sunday School Institution in December 1815. As Hassall's religious convictions strengthened, he decided to enter the ministry and he became the first Australian candidate for ordination.

Following ordination Hassall became Marsden's curate in Parramatta and in 1822 he married Marsden's eldest daughter Anne. Hassall was appointed the first Chaplain of the Bathurst District in early 1826 which was incidentally the area where his father Rowland had conducted the first sermon. While Chaplain, Hassall lived at Lampeter Farm where he built Salem Chapel, and he preached regularly at a barn at Kelso which had opened as a church in 1825. In March 1827 Hassall was appointed to the new parish of the Cowpastures which he described as "Australia beyond Liverpool". In this parish, where he remained for the rest of his life, Hassall resided at the estate of Denbigh at Cobbitty. He appears to have kept some interest in his farm at O'Connell as in the 1828 census he is listed as having 41 employees there, which were nearly all convicts.

Lampeter was one of six blocks at O'Connell Plains held by sons or sons-in-law of Rowland Hassall. Lampeter was Lot 9 and was adjacent to the present O'Connell Road from Beaconsfield Road to Mutton Falls Road.

The Lindlegreen Barn was built in 1827 based on the available account book details in the Hassall family correspondence at the Mitchell Library. (Note: Researched by Merryl Hope) The details noted the payment of A£17 to John Barker for putting up a barn. Barker, a labourer, aged 30 was listed in the 1828 census in Hassall employment at Bathurst. The Hassall's had apparently been storing wheat at O'Connell Plains as early as 1822 and it is possible that the banr was used for this purpose. While there is no reference to the building materials used in this account, in a 1902 publication by Hassall's eldest son, James S. Hassall, he indirectly refers to some general aspects by noting that "some cottages (at Denbigh) had been built, not of sods, as at Bathurst, but of rammed earth". Hassall also later built a chapel, Salem Chapel, in the vicinity of the barn in 1834. This chapel survived until 1975 as part of the Anglican church group located to the west of Lindlegreen. The barn is marked on the 'Plan of 41 acres of Land to be given by Rev'd Mr T. Hassall for a Clergyman's Residence at O'Connell plains 1838'. As such, it is slightly unclear if the barn was part of a rectory here after this date.

Later ownership of the property includes the following: 1920 a further subdivision of one hectare (two acres) between the road and Fish River and another of just over three hectares (seven acres) containing the house and barn with both lots being sold to Catherine Morgan, wife of Samuel Richard Morgan, storekeeper; 1951 sold by Iva Mary Morgan to Letitia Caroline Spicer, spinster of Concord; 1961 sold to John and Theresa Condon; 1961 sold to Joyce Parsons, proprietor of the O'Connell Service Centre; 1970 sold to John Reynders, stationhand of Tarana; 1981 sold to Ronal and Sylvia Farlow; 1988 sold to Robert and Alice Ashelford; and 2015 sold to Bradley Andrew Hargens.

The history of the house Lindelgreen and the evolution of the building has yet to be documented. The 1838 survey plan shows the barn and the chapel, but also a number of buildings on the northern side of Beaconsfield Road close to the barn, one of which is likely the later School of Arts. Peg Savage, a local O'Connell historian, suggests in her historical notes that Lindlegreen may have been called Lampeter Cottage, however, it is also said that Hassall may have also built a second house called Lampeter close to the village near Mutton Falls Road.

Oberon Council allocated a $110,000 grant from the NSW Office of Environment & Heritage towards three workshops teaching O'Connell residents how to maintain and repair earth buildings. Workshop coordinator Angus McKibbin has fond memories of playing in the state-heritage listed Lindlegreen Barn (1827) as a child, which encouraged him to kick-start the project. 'Over the last 50 years, I've watched the barn deteriorate and after discussions with the current owners, we decided to resurrect the building before it was too late', he said. The Bathurst and District branch of the National Trust of Australia (NSW) presented their monthly heritage award for July to this joint Oberon/O'Connell project aiming to restore the region's buildings.

== Description ==
Lindlegreen is a small farm group on the O'Connell Road approximately one kilometre (zero point six two miles) northwest of the centre of the village of O'Connell. The 1.6-hectare (4.0-acre) farm is located on the corner of Beaconsfield and O'Connell Roads and comprises the following buildings: residence fronting O'Connell Road, slab timber barn at the rear fronting Beaconsfield road, an early earth barn at the rear, and a number of other minor rural structures.

The earth barn is constructed of cob; a mixture of shale, clay, straw and water and is used to build substantial structures. The clay acts as an agglutinant and the straw as a reinforcement. The mixture is made by hand and turned over with cob picks. Cob is laid as a continuous course, trampled, then smoothed. Each layer has to dry and set before the next can be laid. This technique is traditional to parts of Wales and the west of England (such as Devon and Cornwall).

The barn at Lindlegreen is a simple rural form approximately 4–4.8 by 12–13.5 metres (13 ft–16 ft × 39 ft–44 ft) with gable ends and tapered walls, 450-millimetre (18 in) thick at the base. The building has a weatherboard skillion, in a fragile condition, on the southern side and evidence of an earlier structure (demolished) on the northern side. The roof is a simple pitched / gabled form sheeted with galvanised iron and timber infill to the western gable. A single entry point is on the northern side. The building externally is in a weathered and poor condition with erosion to the faces of the earthwork, particularly on the western side, where there is extensive vertical structural cracking. Evidence of earlier painted surfaces remain under the protection of the narrow eaves. Internally, the ground floor is timber boarded and the walls generally exposed earth. A low attic space is accessed by ladder and has a timber boarded floor on large round timber bearers that partially project through the external eroded walls. Interesting points of early construction detail are the straw content of the eroded walls, the isolated stone "quoins" to the eroded corners of the external walls, the timber pegs to the floor bearers and shingle clad roof below the galvanised iron sheeting. It appears the exterior walls were originally painted with a black pitch over which limewash was painted.

It appears there was an early tradition in building in cob in this area as the residence of the property is built of the same material (1850s), as well as the nearby O'Connell Hotel (1865).

=== Condition ===
As at 12 June 2018, the condition of the building is poor overall. There is extensive erosion and weathering of the earth walls, particularly the western elevation and its associated southwest and southeast corners. There appearst to have been long-standing water related issues with the western gable and evidence of past repairs and underpinning using concrete. The upper level of the western gable has seriously eroded due to rainwater and wind driven rain damage over many years. A small grants program in 2012 assisted with installation of gutters and downpipes to better manage water flow. Ongoing issues include surface water runoff fown the paddock from the south towards the base of the earth walls, wall surface damage aggravated by livestock in the paddock, brushing of adjacent tree branches, and wind and rain causing the loss of the weathering face of some walls, adequacy of collar ties to roof / rafters, uncertain clay soils resulting in cyclical movements, ongoing structural movement of the fragile upper wall and in proximity of wide wall cracks.

Stabilisation is urgently required to the western gable to halt ongoing movement and potential partial collapse which may precipitate additional damage to adjacent walls or roof.

The building appears to be intact, but suffering from bad deterioration to exterior walling. Needs urgent maintenance works.

=== Further information ===
This assessment was initially made based on the photographic evidence provided in the nomination and verified during a site visit in March 2018.

== Heritage listing ==
As at 26 March 2018, the Lindlegreen Barn at O'Connell is of state heritage significance as a rare example of cob construction. It showcases early colonial builders early reliance on the cob construction technique, using a mix of shale, clay, straw and water, to build substantial walled structures due to the difficulty in sourcing other building materials. The technique relied on the clay acting as an agglutinant and the straw as a reinforcing agent, and was mixed by hand and turned over with a specialised cob pick. The tradition was brought by early settlers originating from the west of England and Wales, and like other traditional building techniques, was a skill passed down in families from generation to generation.

Built in 1827, only four years after the official government survey of the area, the barn represents the period of very early European settlement of inland NSW.

The Hassall family, who built the barn, were prominent in colonial NSW. Friends and servants of Governor Macquarie, whom they hosted at their farm "Macquarie Grove" on the Nepean River near Camden, Rowland Hassall was appointed by Governor Macquarie as Superintended of Government Stock in 1815. In 1818, Macquarie granted the 324 hectares (800 acres) of land to Rowland and his sons, and upon survey and registration in 1823, the land was officially granted by Governor Brisbane.

Lindlegreen Barn was listed on the New South Wales State Heritage Register on 24 August 2018 having satisfied the following criteria.

The place is important in demonstrating the course, or pattern, of cultural or natural history in New South Wales.

The Lindlegreen Barn is of state historical significance as it represents the very early settlement of inland NSW. It was built in 1827, only four years after the official government survey of the area under Governor Brisbane. The barn is a relic of one of the earliest agricultural hubs planned in the Bathurst region. The barn was built by a former convict, John Barker, who was employed by the Hassall family. Barker was paid A£17 for his work.

The place has a strong or special association with a person, or group of persons, of importance of cultural or natural history of New South Wales's history.

The Lindlegreen Barn has a strong historical association with the Hassall family. This family are significant at a State level for their associations with some of the most prominent figures of early Colonial Australia. The barn was built on land granted to the Hassall's by Governor Brisbane in 1823, a part fulfillment of a grant made by Governor Macquarie in 1818, prior to any official survey or registration. Governor Macquarie had engaged Rowland Hassall as his Superintendent of Government Stock in 1815 and the Hassall's hosted Macquarie on their farm "Macquarie Grove" located on the Nepean River showcasing their close bond. Rowland's son Thomas became an important early minister in the Anglican Church and married Anne Marsden, the daughter of Reverend Samuel Marsden, a prominent figure in the Church of England, and the colony's largest sheep breeder. The Lindlegreen Barn was built for the Reverend Thomas Hassall by John Barker who was listed as a labourer in the 1828 census and in Hassall's employ at Bathurst.

The place is important in demonstrating aesthetic characteristics and/or a high degree of creative or technical achievement in New South Wales.

The Lindlegreen Barn is of State aesthetic significance because it is a technical and architectural achievement for its period. As an early cob barn, it retains a high degree of integrity. The structure is testimony to the builder's expertise in utilising the cob building technique. The natural building material, made from subsoil, water, fibrous organic material (typically straw), and sometimes lime, has a unique character and presentation.

The place possesses uncommon, rare or endangered aspects of the cultural or natural history of New South Wales.

The Lindlegreen Barn is a rare early cob building in a State context. Moreover, it is one of a rare number of cob structures surviving in Australia, demonstrating the early architectural construction techniques available to settlers in the early 1800s. The barn is a significant example that could be used as a showcase of the innovative construction methods adopted in the establishment of early inland settlements through NSW.

The place is important in demonstrating the principal characteristics of a class of cultural or natural places/environments in New South Wales.

The Lindlegreen Barn is a representative example of an early cob building in a State context. It demonstrates the building techniques available in the very early settlement of inland NSW. The original structure can still be observed without interference or alteration, allowing a unique insight into the construction techniques and material used in NSW during the early 1800s.

== See also ==
- Australian residential architectural styles
