= The Plot to Overthrow Christmas =

1938 radio play by Norman Corwin

The Plot to Overthrow Christmas is a radio play written by Norman Corwin. It was first performed on December 25, 1938.

The play is a fantasy story about a plot to assassinate Santa Claus. In Hell, Mephistopheles has a meeting with various conspirators to discuss ways to end Christmas. After a few failed proposals, Lucrezia Borgia convinces the others that they could simply assassinate Santa Claus. The former emperor Nero is chosen at the assassin for the job. Santa finds a way to convert Nero to his own cause, counting on Nero's love for music.

== Plot ==
The play, a fantasy told entirely in rhyme, begins with a narrative introduction. It proceeds without further narration, but a character named Sotto voce occasionally interrupts with parenthetical footnotes for the audience. Sound effects depict a descent to Hell: a gong, followed by two crashes of thunder; then an electronic hum, first descending, then ascending in pitch; which dissolves into a sustained violin note, which finally turns into a classical cadenza.

The violin is being played by the Roman emperor Nero, whose playing is interrupted by a courier summoning him to an urgent meeting called by the Devil, Mephistopheles. Mephisto explains to an assembly including Nero, Ivan the Terrible, the Biblical Haman, the Roman emperor Caligula, the Borgias, and Simon Legree, that he is concerned about the thwarting of his efforts to corrupt humanity, by the peace and good will generated by the Christmas holiday. He solicits proposals to deal with the matter. First, Caligula suggests poisoning Christmas foods and candies. Next, Nero suggests corrupting sacred Christmas music by converting it to jazz music style, as has been done to classical music. Then Legree suggests bribing the US Congress to outlaw Christmas, but Mephisto points out the uncertainty of depending on corrupt politicians, who could just as easily be turned the other way. Finally, Lucrezia Borgia suggests assassinating Santa Claus, a deed she is anxious to do herself. Mephisto puts the proposals to a vote, and Borgia's plan wins. Nero is then chosen by lottery as the assassin.

After a bit of fuss about how to get to Earth and to find Santa, Nero ascends to Earth with a gun in Act II and makes the arduous trek to Santa's domicile in the North Pole. Santa invites him in, well aware of Nero's sinister purpose. Santa tells Nero that the Devil cares nothing about Nero, and is only using him to acquire as large an earthly empire as possible. Nero briefly succumbs to this logic, but then takes Santa's argument as a battle of wits, and boasts of his intellectual superiority and cultural (musical) sensitivity. Santa counters Nero's boasting by expounding on the sentimental joys and wonders of Christmas, of which Nero knows nothing. This touches Nero's heart and causes him to repent of his evil purpose and ask how he can help Santa. Santa then showers Nero with hospitality, and runs to get a present for him: a Stradivarius violin. Santa also gives him a piece of sheet music, and the play closes with Nero playing The First Noel on the Stradivarius.

== Conception and early productions ==
In 1938, Norman Corwin was hired by the CBS Radio Network and given his own show, Norman Corwin's Words Without Music. After the show on the week before Christmas, his producer put him on the spot by asking him what he intended to do for a Christmas show. Corwin came up with the title off the top of his head. This constrained his writing, but gave him the opening line: "Did you hear about the plot to overthrow Christmas?" The play was first broadcast on December 25. By 1940, Corwin was leading CBS's Columbia Workshop, and he again produced The Plot to Overthrow Christmas on December 22 of that year. CBS had Corwin produce and direct the play a third time on December 19, 1944, with most of the original cast, which included Will Geer as Mephistopheles. Santa Claus was played by House Jameson, and Nero was played by black stage and radio actor Eric Burroughs. Henry Morgan appeared in the 1944 broadcast as the narrator, as Ivan the Terrible, and Simon Legree. Corwin called Burroughs "the finest Negro actor in radio" after his 1936 appearance in Orson Welles' Federal Theatre production of Macbeth. Jameson later appeared in supporting roles in the 1948 film The Naked City and in nine episodes of its television series adaptation between 1959 and 1963.

In 1960, Corwin collaborated with composer Walter Scharf to turn the play into an opera, for which he provided the libretto. However, Corwin and Scharf could not agree on business terms, and the opera remained only in manuscript form. It was performed only once, in 2000 at Brigham Young University.

== Recreation on public television ==
In 1969, Los Angeles public television station KCET produced a program about Corwin's play, which included an interview with Corwin about the play's origin, and a rehearsal and television reading of the play. The show was rebroadcast on PBS on December 23, 1971, as an episode of Hollywood Television Theatre. KCET rebroadcast the program in 2010 (about a year before Corwin's death) in honor of his 100th birthday, and followed it with a new interview with Corwin.

Corwin added two scenes to his original script for the TV production. On his way to the North Pole, Nero encounters a reporter who attempts to poll him on his opinions of classical composers and conductors. He also briefly encounters a woman speaking a strange-sounding language; Corwin decided to add this after hearing an extra cast as one of the demons imitate the sound of a tape being rewound.

=== Cast ===
Corwin cast several contemporary veteran radio and television character actors for his 1969 television production.

- John McIntire as the Devil; McIntire was a character actor known from his starring role in the television series Wagon Train from 1961 to 1965.
- Karl Swenson as Nero; Swenson was a veteran film and television character actor, best known as Lars Hanson from 1974 to 1978 on television's Little House on the Prairie.
- Jeanette Nolan as Lucrezia Borgia; Nolan, a radio, film and television actress, was the wife of McIntire.
- Parley Baer as Simon Legree; Baer was a radio and television character actor known as the next-door neighbor on The Adventures of Ozzie and Harriet and as the mayor of Mayberry on The Andy Griffith Show.
- Edward Platt as Sotto Voce; Platt was known as Maxwell Smart's boss on the 1960s TV series Get Smart.
- Alan Reed, Sr. as Santa Claus; Reed was famous as the original voice of Fred Flintstone in the 1960s TV series The Flintstones.
- Jerry Hausner as the courier; Hausner appeared on I Love Lucy as the agent of Ricky Ricardo (Desi Arnaz), and as the voice of cartoon character Mr. Magoo's nephew Waldo.
- Paul Condylis as Haman and the Announcer. He played roles in What's Up, Doc?, and Targets.
- Henry Corden as Ivan the Terrible; Corden was best known for taking over the voice of Fred Flintstone when Reed died in 1977.
- Byron Kane as the Reporter; made 43 appearances on TV shows and movies.
- Steve Franken as Caligula; Franken appeared numerous times on TV and film.

== Recent performances ==
A localised version of the play was rehearsed, performed and recorded live on November 27, 2022 at the Malachi Gilmore Memorial Hall (built 1937) in the town of Oberon, New South Wales, Australia.
