= Jenolan, New South Wales =

Locality in New South Wales, Australia

Jenolan
- Town
- Coordinates: 33°49′06″S 150°01′19″E
- Country: Australia
- State: New South Wales
- Region: Central West
- LGA: Oberon Council
- Location: 28 km (17 mi) SE of Oberon

Government
  - State electorate: Bathurst
  - Federal division: Calare

Population
  - Total: 36 (SAL 2021)
- Postcode: 2790

Jenolan is a rural locality in the local government area (LGA) of Oberon Council in the Central West region of New South Wales. The locality is about 28 kilometres (17 mi) south-east of the town of Oberon. The 2021 census recorded a population of 36 for the locality.

== History ==
The name “Jenolan Caves” was adopted in 1884. It is assumed that the locality name was derived from the caves.

== Geography ==
The Jenolan Caves are within the locality, and the Jenolan River flows through.

== Road infrastructure ==
Jenolan Caves Road provides access to the locality from Hartley on the Great Western Highway, and Edith Road provides access from Oberon.
