= Lowther, New South Wales =

Lowther New South Wales
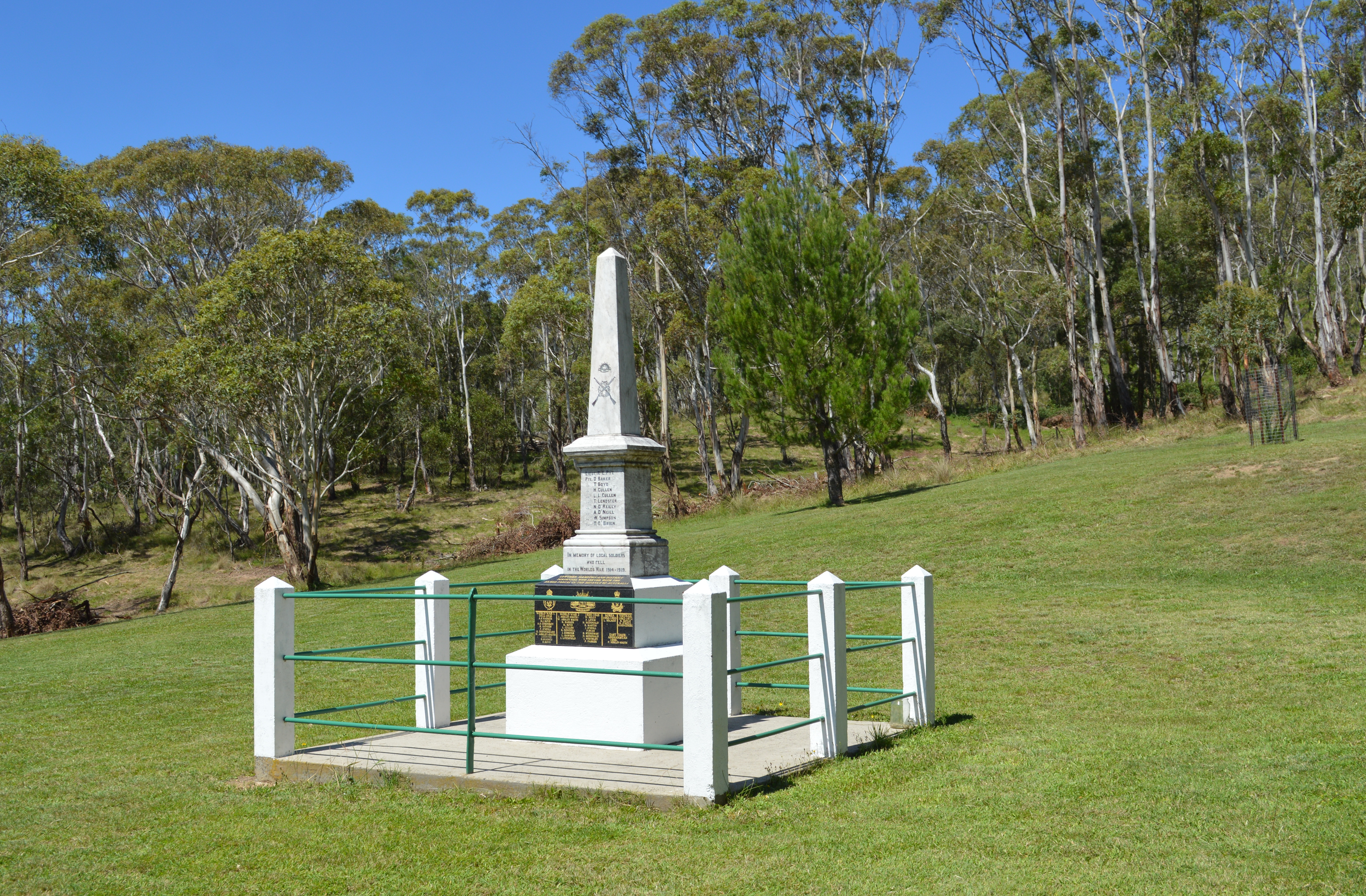
- War memorial at Lowther, 2015

- Coordinates: 33°37′10″S 150°06′14″E
- Population: 69 (SAL 2021)
- Postcode(s): 2790
- Location: 142 km (88 mi) SW of Sydney; 21 km (13 mi) S of Lithgow; 8 km (5 mi) NE of Hampton
- LGA(s): City of Lithgow
- State electorate(s): Bathurst
- Federal division(s): Calare

Lowther is a locality in New South Wales, Australia. The locality is in the City of Lithgow local government area, 142 kilometres (88 mi) south west of the state capital, Sydney.

At the 2021 census, Lowther had a population of 69.
