= Duckmaloi River =

River in New South Wales, Australia

Coordinates: 33°47′S 149°55′E

Duckmaloi River Duckmaloi, Fish River, Duck Maloi River
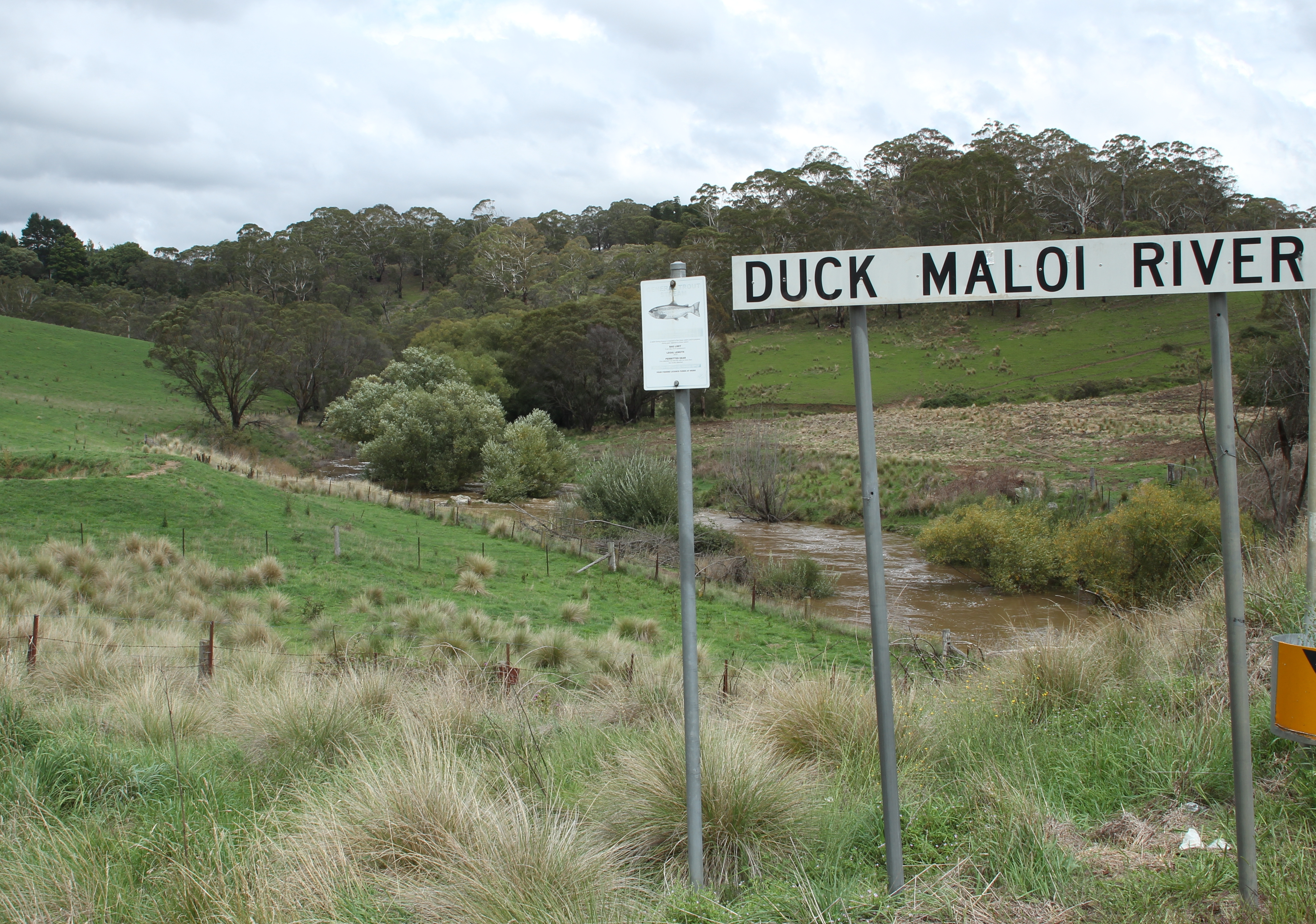
- Duckmaloi River, near Oberon, after heavy rainfall, 2013

Location
- Country: Australia
- State: New South Wales
- Region: South Eastern Highlands (IBRA), Central Tablelands
- Local government area: Oberon

Physical characteristics
- Source: Great Dividing Range
  - location: near Shooters Hill
  - elevation: 1,280 m (4,200 ft)
- Mouth: confluence with the Fish River
  - location: near Oberon
  - elevation: 1,010 m (3,310 ft)
- Length: 27 km (17 mi)

Basin features
- River system: Macquarie River, Murray–Darling basin
- Reservoir: Duckmaloi Weir

Duckmaloi River, a perennial stream that is part of the Macquarie catchment within the Murray–Darling basin, is located in the Central Tablelands region of New South Wales, Australia.

The Duckmaloi River rises on the western slopes of the Great Dividing Range east of Shooters Hill, and flows generally to the north and then east, where it forms its confluence with the Fish River near Oberon; dropping 265 metres (869 ft) over the course of its 27 kilometres (17 mi) length.

A small weir on the river, called the Duckmaloi Weir, forms part of the Fish River Water Supply Scheme and was constructed during 1963. The Scheme supplies water to Oberon and Lithgow Councils and the Sydney Catchment Authority for town water supplies, as well as Wallerawang and Mount Piper power stations owned by Delta Electricity for power generation purposes. The waters surrounding the weir are a site for a large platypus colony.

== See also ==
- Rivers of New South Wales
- List of rivers of Australia
