= Jenolan Caves =

Limestone caves in New South Wales, Australia

- Tharawal: Binoomea, Bindo, Binda; Fish River Caves
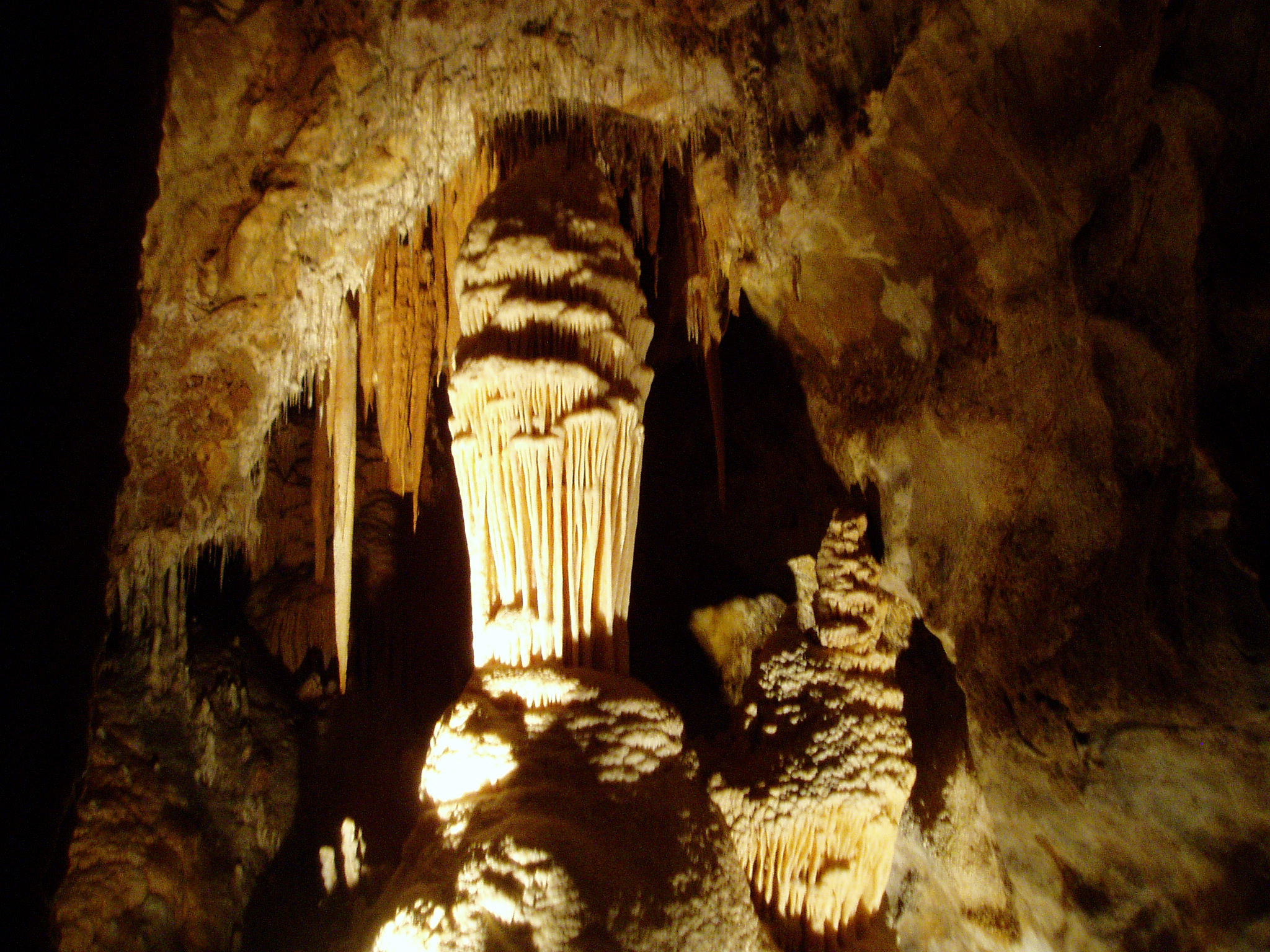
- The Grand Column

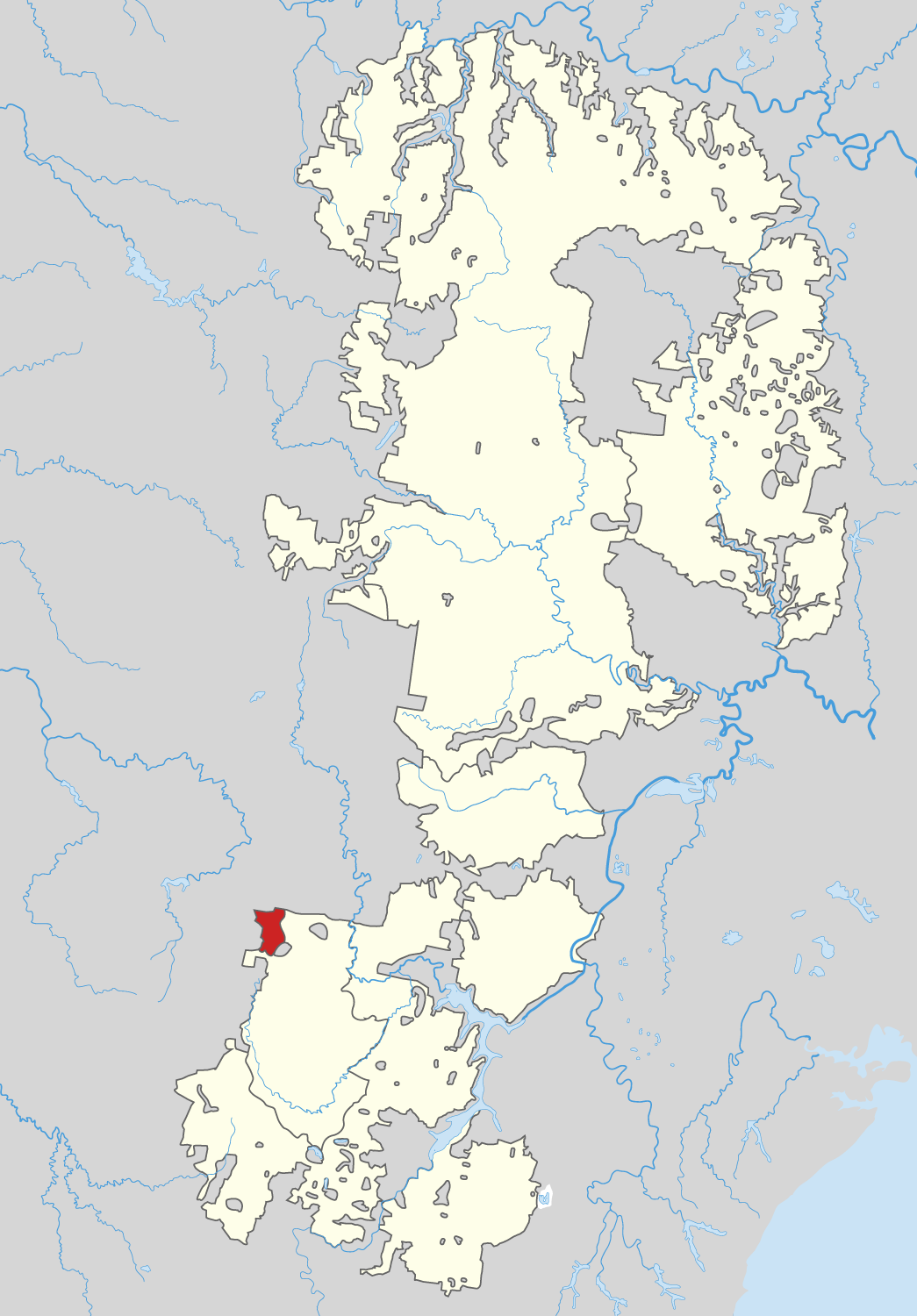
- Location of the Jenolan Karst Conservation Reserve, shaded in red, on the Greater Blue Mountains World Heritage Area
- Location: Oberon, New South Wales, Australia
- Discovery: 1838 – James Whalan (European)
- Geology: Limestone
- Entrances: 300
- Access: Public; eleven show caves open daily
- Lighting: LED
- Website: http://www.jenolancaves.org.au/

UNESCO World Heritage Site
- Location within New South Wales Location within Australia

UNESCO World Heritage Site
- Official name: Greater Blue Mountains Area
- Location: New South Wales, Australia
- Part of: Greater Blue Mountains Area
- Criteria: Natural: (ix), (x)
- Reference: 917
- Inscription: 2000 (24th Session)
- Area: 1,032,649 ha (2,551,730 acres)
- Buffer zone: 86,200 ha (213,000 acres)
- Coordinates: 33°49′14″S 150°1′17″E

Australian National Heritage List
- Official name: Jenolan Caves, Jenolan Caves Rd, Oberon, NSW, Australia
- Type: Natural
- Designated: undated
- Part of: Greater Blue Mountains Area UNESCO World Heritage List
- Reference no.: 106242
- Place File No.: 1/07/236/0007
- Area: 145 hectares (360 acres)

Jenolan Karst Conservation Reserve
- IUCN category III (natural monument or feature)
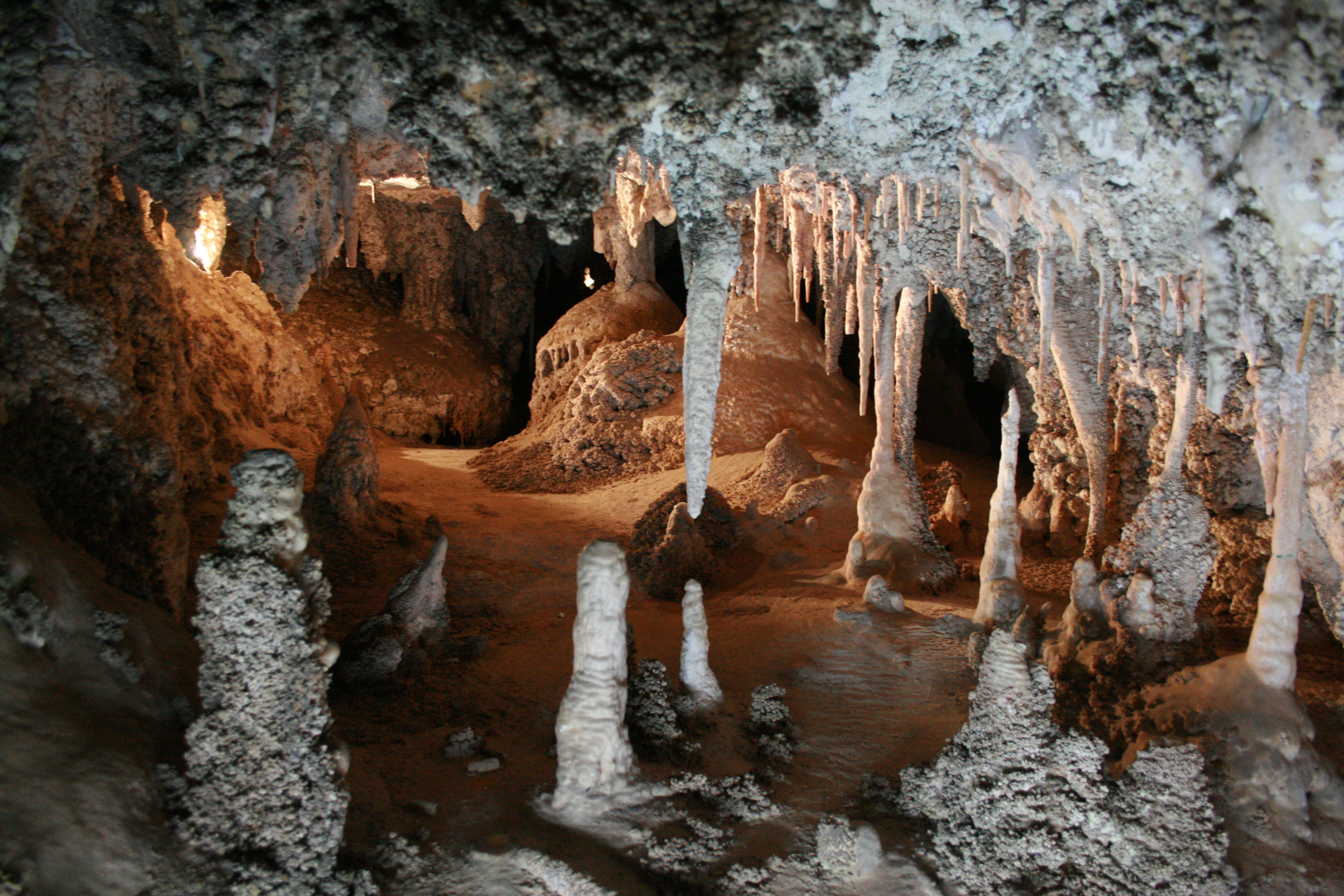
- The Imperial Cave at Jenolan Caves

- Location within New South Wales
- Location: New South Wales
- Nearest city: Oberon
- Area: 30.83 km^{2} (11.90 sq mi)
- Established: 6 December 1997
- Governing body: Jenolan Caves Reserve Trust; NSW National Parks & Wildlife Service

New South Wales Heritage Register
- Official name: Jenolan Caves Reserve; Binoomea; Binda Caves; Fish River Caves; McKeon's Caves; McEwan's Creek Caves; Bendo Caves; Jenolan Karst Conservation Reserve
- Type: State heritage (landscape)
- Designated: 25 June 2004
- Reference no.: 1698
- Type: Cave
- Category: Landscape – Natural

The Jenolan Caves (Tharawal: Binoomea, Bindo, Binda) are limestone caves located within the Jenolan Karst Conservation Reserve in the Central Tablelands region, west of the Blue Mountains, in Jenolan, Oberon Council, New South Wales, in eastern Australia. The caves and 3,083-hectare (7,620-acre) reserve are situated approximately 175 kilometres (109 mi) west of Sydney, 20 kilometres (12 mi) east of Oberon and 30 kilometres (19 mi) west of Katoomba (74 kilometres (46 mi) by road). Dating back to 340 million years ago, it is the oldest known and dated open cave system in the world.

The caves are the most visited of several similar groups in the limestone caves of the country, and the most ancient discovered open caves in the world. They include numerous Silurian marine fossils and the calcite formations, sometimes pure white, are noted for their beauty. The cave network follows the course of a subterranean section of the Jenolan River. It has more than 40 kilometres (25 mi) of multi-level passages and over 300 entrances. The complex is still being explored. The caves are a tourist destination, with eleven illuminated show caves open to paying visitors.

The caves and conservation reserve are one of the eight protected areas that was inscribed in 2000 to form part of the UNESCO World Heritage-listed Greater Blue Mountains Area. The Jenolan Karst Conservation Reserve is the most westerly of the eight protected areas within the World Heritage Site. The reserve forms part of the Great Dividing Range and was listed on the (now defunct) Register of the National Estate in 1978. The Jenolan Caves are listed on the Australian National Heritage List.

== Etymology ==
The word Jenolan is believed to be an indigenous word for "high place"; derived from the Tharawal word, Genowlan, for a "high place shaped like a foot". An alternative (although highly unlikely) meaning comes from the name "J E Nolan" that was found smoked by a candle on the roof of a cave.

== History ==
=== Geology ===
By measuring the ratio of radioactive potassium and trapped argon gas, which was produced when the potassium decayed, scientists determined the age of the clay in the caves to be approximately 340 million years old, thereby making the cave complex the world's oldest known and dated open cave system. The Commonwealth Scientific and Industrial Research Organisation (CSIRO) in association with the University of Sydney and the Australian Museum lead the efforts in scientific research into the caves.

=== Indigenous culture ===
For thousands of years, the Jenolan area has been part of the culture of local indigenous peoples. The area holds significance to the Gundungurra and Wiradjuri peoples, who knew it as Binomil or Bin-oo-mur, and a variety of similar names. A Dreamtime creation story of the Gundungurra people describes how the countryside came into being, and involves a struggle between two ancestral creator spirits – one a giant eel-like creature, Gurangatch, and the other, Mirrigan, a large native cat or quoll. The Gundungurra people penetrated the caves as far as the subterranean water, carrying sick people to be bathed in this water, which they believed to have curative powers.

=== European discovery ===
There are no known contemporaneous accounts of the discovery of the caves by Europeans – though Charles Whalan is attributed as the first to conduct visitors to the caves in the 1840s. However, in Charles Whalan's obituary and other sources, credit for the caves' discovery is given to his brother, James Whalan. Though most accounts were written some decades after the initial discovery, and differ somewhat in the details, it is generally accepted that in 1838 (or possibly 1841), James Whalan was in pursuit of an ex-convict and active local thief named McKeown, who had stolen livestock, tools, clothing and a flour grinder, was tracked to the area. In this pursuit, James Whalan discovered the cave system and reported its existence to his brother Charles – who further explored the caves.

The caves, originally known as the Fish River Caves, came under the control of the NSW Government in 1866—becoming only the second area in the world reserved for the purpose of conservation. The following year, Jeremiah Wilson was appointed as the first "Keeper of the Caves". Wilson not only explored the already known Elder and Lucas Caves but later discovered the Imperial, Left Imperial (now known as Chifley), Jersey and Jubilee Caves.

The caves were open to tourism early, but there was little protection from visitors damaging formations until the collection of souvenirs and the writing of graffiti was banned in 1872. In 1884 the name Jenolan Caves was adopted.

The road to the caves originally went via Tarana, which meant that travellers from the south had to take a long, roundabout route of about 140km (90 mi) from Katoomba to Tarana, and, from there, to Oberon, New South Wales. In the mid-1880s, hotel keepers in Katoomba wanted to improve business by constructing a road to the Caves from their town, but the steep, rough ground between the caves and town was a major obstacle, and several attempts failed. However, representations were made to the Premier by Peter Fitzpatrick of Burragorang, who was connected to some mining operations near Katoomba. In April 1884, William Marshall Cooper, Surveyor of Public Parks for the State Government, was assigned the job, and worked out a horse-and-carriage track in a 10-day trek from Katoomba to the Caves. The route was, he remarked, 42km (26 mi) from the Western Hotel in Katoomba. "... Anyone accustomed to walking can do it comfortably in 12 hours ... when the proposed horse track is completed, it will be a very enjoyable ride of five hours." It became known as the Six Foot Track.

By 1885, Parliament had approved A£2,500 for the construction of Cooper's bridle track, with the work starting at the most difficult area, the Megalong Cleft, where a zig-zag had to be cut, partly in solid rock, to reduce the grade to 1:5.5. The first recorded passage of the completed bridle track from Katoomba to Jenolan was by the Governor, Lord Carrington, in September 1887. Lord Carrington also made the first official visit to the caves at the completion of his journey, accompanied by Wilson.

In 1898 the current Jenolan Caves House was built, replacing the earlier wooden accommodation house built by Jeremiah Wilson, which had been partially destroyed in 1895 by fire.

J. C. (Voss) Wiburd became "Keeper of the Caves" in 1903 and discovered (with fellow guide and friend Jack Edwards) five more caves within eighteen months: the River, Pool of Cerberus, Temple of Baal, Orient and Ribbon Caves. He remained Keeper until 1932, when he left due to the Government's policy at the time of compulsory retirement at the age of 65.

The Chifley Cave, originally known as the Left Imperial Cave, was renamed in 1952 in honour of Ben Chifley, the Federal local member of parliament and former Prime Minister, who had died the previous year. In 1968, the Orient Cave became the first in the world to be cleaned, due to contamination by mud from the previous access route and a nearby coal boiler. The soot from the boiler was entering the cave via a new tunnel blasted 400 feet through to the Orient cave in 1954 to allow easier access (entering at Bat End). Steam cleaning was found to be damaging to the crystal formations, due to the rapid expansion and contraction caused by the heat from the steam, and these days water from the caves' own underground rivers is used if cave cleaning becomes necessary.

Since 2011, the CSIRO in association with the Australian Nuclear Science and Technology Organisation began using a new hand-held mapping system to map some of the caves in three-dimensional detail.

== Caves ==
Large portions of this extensive cave system are accessible only to experienced cavers, especially those areas along the underground river system.

Eleven show caves have been developed for regular tourism and are open to the public.

List of show caves accessible to the public
Cave name	European discovery	Image	Accessibility	Lighting	Description	Source(s)					
Cave name	European discovery	Image	Accessibility	Lighting	Description	Source(s)	Lucas	1860	Popular among visitors	LED	Named in honour of John Lucas MP who pushed to have the caves preserved in the 1860s, this cave features a number of large chambers including the cathedral, over 50 metres (160 ft) high, and the vast Exhibition Chamber which contains the Broken Column formation. Due to its size and acoustics, the Cathedral Chamber is also used for wedding ceremonies and recitals.
River	1903		Extensive show cave; most strenuous	LED	Includes some of its most famous features, including the Minaret, the Grand Column and the Queen's Canopy, as well as part of the River Styx. Until 1923 when a concrete bridge was built, a section of river in this cave was crossed by a small boat.						
Chifley	1880		Extensive show cave	LED	The Chifley Cave was the first cave in the world to be lit by electric light, in 1880. Two of the cave's chambers are still decorated with historic coloured lights.						
Imperial	1879		Easy for tourists	LED	The Imperial contains some of the best fossil deposits and several Tasmanian devil bones. Note that while fossils may not be clearly evident to the casual visitor, in fact, the bedrock in which the caves are formed is richly endowed with marine fossils.						
Orient	1904		Opened in 1917	LED	This cave contains some of the grandest formations in the complex and was steam cleaned to preserve them in 1968. Until 1954, this cave, along with the Temple of Baal and Ribbon Caves, were only accessible through the River Cave. That year, the Binoomea Cut was constructed near Caves House to facilitate easier access to these caves. An LED-based lighting system was installed in this cave in 2009.						
Ribbon	1904			LED	The Ribbon Cave is 60 metres (200 ft) long and is richly decorated. This cave is known for particularly good examples of 'ribbon' helictites.						
Pool of Cerberus	1903			LED	This cave is a lower arm of the River Cave. The major formations here are the Bath of Venus and part of the underground river system that forms the Pool of Cerberus itself. It also includes rare aragonite formations.						
Jubilee	1893			LED	The Jubilee Cave is the longest show cave at Jenolan. It takes the longest amount of time to visit as it is fairly remote from the other caves. Of the caves shown at Jenolan to the public it is the least visited due to the length of the tour and the small tour groups that can be taken there.						
Temple of Baal	1904			LED	This cave consists of only two large chambers, one of which is dominated by the huge 9-metre shawl formation called the Angel's Wing. The cave is also noted for a high incidence of the peculiar formations known as Helictites. The name derives partly from the biblical story of Baal and other more obscure ancient mythology. The feature names in the cave also partly relate to the biblical story, as well as Esoteric Freemasonry. Recent 2006 development work has upgraded the lighting and added an audio accompaniment to the cave experience.						
Nettle Cave	1838		Self–guided audio tour	LED	The Nettle Cave lies between the Grand Arch and the Devils Coach House. The cave takes its name from the nettles which grow near its entrance (note that raised walkways protect visitors from their stings); an upper part of this cave can be seen from inside the Devil's Coach House. Originally shown as a guided tour, the cave was closed to the public in 1932 and re-opened in 2006, combined with the adjoining Devil's Coach House. The Nettle Cave hosts "Crayfish backs", stromatolites shaped by cyanobacteria, light and wind. They are estimated to be at least 20,000 years old. Due to rock falls (made more probable by drought, according to the cave guides) the easy access path from the Grand Arch to the Devil's Coach House is currently closed. The open cave is best accessed via a 270-stair descent from the Carlotta Carpark.						
The Grand Arch	1838		Assembly point for tours		The road from Sydney passes through the Arch and six of the cave tours leave from assembly points within it. Adjacent to the Grand Arch is the Devil's Coach House, a vast open-ended chamber that forms part of the many nature walks in the area. High above both of these is Carlotta Arch, a free-standing arch that is all that remains of a higher cavern system long since eroded and collapsed. Along with these areas, there are several other caves in the area, some of which are available for special tours.						
Elder Cave	1848		Adventure caving		Named from the Elder tree, visitors would climb down to enter the doline (sinkhole). The Elder Cave was the first of the caves at Jenolan to be found and opened to tourists. It was later considered too difficult to develop adequately and tours eventually ceased; however, in the late 1990s, the Elder Cave was re-opened for adventure caving, and is sold as the Plughole Tour. It is not as decorated as the regular show caves, but features signatures left by early visitors and includes a short section of the Imperial Cave.						
Aladdin Cave	1897				The Aladdin Cave was first explored in the hope of developing a shorter path to the Jubilee Cave. It has similar decorations to the Jubilee Cave.						
Jersey Cave	1891				An extension of the Elder Cave. One of the features is a fossilised thylacine skeleton.						
Arch Cave	1838				This cave lies above Nettle Cave and part of it can be seen from the Devils Coach House. The entrance to this cave is at the base of Carlotta Arch (hence the name) and the stairs and locked gate can still be reached although the Arch Cave.						

== Tourism ==
The Jenolan Caves are located three hours' drive from Sydney and Canberra. Private coach companies operate day tours from Sydney and from Katoomba railway station. There is no public transport to Jenolan Caves. The caves attract over 250,000 visitors a year, making it one of the most popular tourist locations in rural New South Wales, and has won numerous tourism awards.

Historically the caves were only accessible via the Six Foot Track, a 45-kilometre-long bridle trail from Katoomba established in 1884. This trail became disused in the early 1900s after new roads were built in the area, but was reopened as a bushwalking track in 1984. It is now one of the most popular overnight bushwalks in the Blue Mountains area.

Ten of the area's "dark caves" are open for regular guided tours every day (1 to 2 hours per tour). These show cave tour sizes vary. For example, the delicate Pool of Cerberus Cave can have only 8 on a tour, while the Lucas Cave (with its large chambers) can have up to 65 people per tour.

Tours vary in difficulty. Imperial Cave, for example, has the fewest stairs, while the River Cave is the most strenuous. The average tourist can tour any of these show caves.

A self-guided tour of the huge Nettle Cave/Devils Coach House is also available. The self-guided tour gives visitors a choice of many languages. One of the choices on the self-guided tour is an Aboriginal culture commentary.

Night tours are currently only available to guests of The Grand Jenolan Cave House. Sometimes, on Saturday nights they take guests on guided tours through caves that are not available to day-visitors.

Several undeveloped caves are available for adventure caving (2-hour to all-day tours). These adventure caving tours include the Plughole Tour, which runs daily and includes basic abseiling. Other more challenging adventure caving tours are available.

The Cathedral Chamber, part of the "Lucas Cave" is famous for its acoustics. Underground concerts take place in this chamber. Concerts also take place in the Grand Arch, including the annual 'Carols in the Caves', which raises money for charity.

During school holidays, specially developed tours are available for children. Jenolan Caves has long been a popular destination for school excursions.

The whole of Jenolan Caves will be closed for at least 18 months starting from 15 July 2024. The reasons given only reveal part of the problems with the care, control and management of the Jenolan Karst Conservation Reserve.

=== Jenolan Caves House ===
Tourists visiting Jenolan Caves can stay at the heritage-listed Jenolan Caves House. It was designed in 1897 by government architect Walter Liberty Vernon as a resort or retreat for the wealthy. To cater for the expectations of the well-to-do, Vernon included a ballroom and grand dining room, now Chisolm's Restaurant. Chisolm's is open for dinner every day, serving modern Australian cuisine. Facilities include an hotel/motel complex, self-contained cottages, restaurant, bar, and cafe.

== Heritage listing ==
On 25 June 2004 Jenolan Caves Reserve (excluding the caves) were listed on the New South Wales State Heritage Register for its historical, aesthetic, research and rarity values, with the following inscription:

Jenolan Caves Reserve is of state significance for its historical, aesthetic, research and rarity values. The caves and karst landscapes developed as important scientific and tourist destinations throughout the late 19th and 20th centuries, and the Reserve is highly significant as the first public reserve set aside in NSW for the protection of a natural resource—in this case, the Jenolan Caves.

— Statement of significance, New South Wales State Heritage Register, 2004.

The caves and karst landscapes developed as important scientific and tourist destinations throughout the late 19th and 20th centuries, and the Reserve is highly significant as the first public reserve set aside in NSW for the protection of a natural resource - in this case, the Jenolan Caves. The Reserve is highly regarded for the aesthetic qualities of the caves and cave formations, reflected in cave names such as Aladdin and Gem Cave; for the ability of the caves to demonstrate technological developments such as the first use of electric cave lighting in the 1880s, and the first development of hydro-electric power in Australia. The setting of the caves hamlet in the Jenolan Valley, with the tiny hamlet and picturesque Caves House almost dwarfed by steeply rising cliffs on all sides, the entrance into the hamlet through the fortress-like Grand Arch, and the distinctive Blue Lake formed by the weir for the hydro-electric scheme, all combine to form a landscape of great beauty and distinctiveness.

The Reserve has the ability to yield information on the geological history of NSW and of the Australian continent, and for the archaeological potential of the hamlet area to provide evidence of the early period in the development of tourism in NSW. The number of rare and uncommon flora and fauna species to which it is home, especially within the caves; and the evidence it can demonstrate of the development of tourism, especially mountain and caving tourism, in NSW, add to the significance of the Jenolan Caves Reserve (HO).

The geomorphic history of the Jenolan Caves system is extremely complex, the cave system contains an exceptionally diverse variety of karst and cave types illustrating the full range of processes and products from incipient, scarcely perceptible depressions through to multistage cave developments and decayed remnant features. The McKeowns Valley, north of Blue Lake contains the finest such assemblage in Australia. The Jenolan River valley is one of the most outstanding fluviokarst valleys in the world. The range and diversity of the karst and decoration, including a remarkable diversity of mineral species, is varied, profuse and equal to the finest in the world. The Jenolan Caves and surrounding areas contains a very diverse assemblage of morphologies and mineral species. There is evidence in these features of the influences of palaeo-landscapes. The contribution to the formation of the landscape of structural influences, lithological influences, and drainage patterns is the source of considerable scientific and educational interest at Jenolan. The geomorphology of Jenolan includes a variety of non-karstic phenomena that are important because of their relationship with the karst. Because these features lie adjacent to, and in some cases over, the karst they give considerable insight into the formation of the karst. A large number of invertebrate fossils have been discovered in the limestone of the Jenolan Caves. These include corals, stromatoporoids, algae, brachiopods, gastropods and straight nautiloids. Subfossil remains of many vertebrates are also found in the caves.

The caves provide shelter and habitat for a number of rare species including the Greater sooty owl (Tyto tenebricosa tenebricosa) (rare in Australia) which roosts in the cave known as the Devil's Coach House and the Jenolan Caves Reserve supports a population of the brush-tailed rock-wallaby (Petrogale penicillata). This species is listed as vulnerable on Schedule 12 of the NSW National Parks and Wildlife Act. Also found in the caves is the opilionid arachnid Holonuncia cavernicola which is known only from the Jenolan Caves system. The Caves Reserve contains three rare or endangered plant species. These are Pseudanthus divaricatissimus (3RC), Gonocarpus longifolius (3RC), and Geranium graniticola (3RC). In the latter half of the 19th century the caves were recognised as perhaps the premier natural attraction in Australia. Although they no longer occupy this role, Jenolan remains one of the most important natural heritage areas in Australia. The caves are a very high-profile natural feature in NSW. The Jenolan Caves area is widely used as a research and teaching site for studying the geomorphology and processes involved in karst formation.

Jenolan is one of the most important areas of natural and cultural history in Australia. The area includes one of the largest and most beautiful interconnected cave systems in Australia and is an outstanding site of geological and speleological interest. The Jenolan River, Blue Lake and a system of intimate valleys and watercourses provide a magnificent setting for a distinctive range of native vegetation and fauna. The Caves Reserve was created in 1866, six years before the declaration of the world's first National Park. Since its reported discovery by James Whalan between 1838 and 1841 the area has attracted more than three million visitors. Caves House, and its associated outbuildings, adds to the area's cultural significance. The area also contains a number of important industrial relics, including Australia's first hydro-electric power station and the remnants of the first electric lighting of caves which was installed in the Chifley Cave in 1887.

Jenolan Caves was listed on the New South Wales State Heritage Register on 25 June 2004 having satisfied the following criteria.

The place is important in demonstrating the course, or pattern, of cultural or natural history in New South Wales.

Jenolan Caves Reserve is of state significance for its ability to demonstrate the significant historical activity of identifying and conserving the natural resources of NSW - in this case, the caves and karst landscapes that have developed as important scientific and tourist destinations throughout the late 19th and 20th centuries. The Reserve is highly significant as the first public reserve set aside in NSW for the protection of a natural resource - in this case, the caves, and as such predates the creation of The National Park in 1879. The caves hamlet illustrates the significant human activity of providing accommodation for travellers and tourists since the 1890s in romantic buildings especially designed for this purpose by the Government Architect (HO).

The place has a strong or special association with a person, or group of persons, of importance of cultural or natural history of New South Wales's history.

Jenolan Caves Reserve is significant for its associations with Government Architect Walter Liberty Vernon, who design much of Caves House. Although only the first or 1897 wing was built during his tenure, his plans were respected and adapted by subsequent government architects so that the original style and setting for the building has been largely maintained to the present day (HO).

The place is important in demonstrating aesthetic characteristics and/or a high degree of creative or technical achievement in New South Wales.

Jenolan Caves Reserve is of state significance for its caves and cave formations, which are recognised for their aesthetic qualities. These are reflected in the names of caves such as Aladdin, Orient and Temple of Baal, and formations such as Gem, Arabesque, Angel's Wing and Pool of Reflections. The caves also demonstrate technological developments, including the introduction of electric lighting in caves in the 1880s and the development of hydro-electric power in Australia. The caves hamlet is situated in the Jenolan Valley, where steep cliffs surround the settlement and Caves House. Access to the hamlet is through the Grand Arch, while the Blue Lake was formed by the weir constructed for the hydro-electric scheme. Together, these features contribute to the landscape significance of the reserve (HO).

The place has strong or special association with a particular community or cultural group in New South Wales for social, cultural or spiritual reasons.

Jenolan Caves Reserve is of state significance for its associations with many groups of people, three of which have been particularly identified - tourists, speleologists (that is, those who study caves and engage in caving) and guides. From the 1860s travellers and cavers have visited the Reserve, and cavers have continued to explore and make know to the public more of the caves, their connecting passages and the often unique plants and animals that inhabit this subterranean and lightless world. The caves are also important to the community of caretakers and guides who for nearly 150 years have guided visitors through the caves, shown them the beauty and wonders of the caverns, interpreted and educated people about the geological history of eastern Australia, and made the caves hamlet their home (HO).

The place has potential to yield information that will contribute to an understanding of the cultural or natural history of New South Wales.

Jenolan Caves Reserve is of state significance for its ability to yield information on the geological history of NSW and of the Australian continent, as the benchmark karst landscapes contained within the NSW reserve system, and for the archaeological potential of the hamlet area to provide evidence of the early period in the development of tourism in NSW (HO).

The place possesses uncommon, rare or endangered aspects of the cultural or natural history of New South Wales.

The Jenolan Caves Reserve is of state significance for the number of rare and uncommon flora and fauna species to which it is home, especially within the caves; for containing the greatest diversity of cave invertebrates in NSW; and for the evidence it can demonstrate of the development of tourism, especially mountain and caving tourism, for over a century and a half in NSW (HO).

== Climate ==
Climate data for Jenolan Caves
Month	Jan	Feb	Mar	Apr	May	Jun	Jul	Aug	Sep	Oct	Nov	Dec	Year
Mean daily maximum °C (°F)	25.6 (78.1)	24.6 (76.3)	21.8 (71.2)	16.7 (62.1)	12.8 (55.0)	10.0 (50.0)	9.4 (48.9)	11.5 (52.7)	15.3 (59.5)	19.4 (66.9)	22.4 (72.3)	25.0 (77.0)	17.9 (64.2)
Mean daily minimum °C (°F)	11.6 (52.9)	11.7 (53.1)	10.0 (50.0)	6.4 (43.5)	3.2 (37.8)	1.5 (34.7)	0.2 (32.4)	0.9 (33.6)	2.9 (37.2)	5.7 (42.3)	8.1 (46.6)	10.3 (50.5)	6.0 (42.8)
Source: Australian Bureau of Meteorology

== Gallery ==
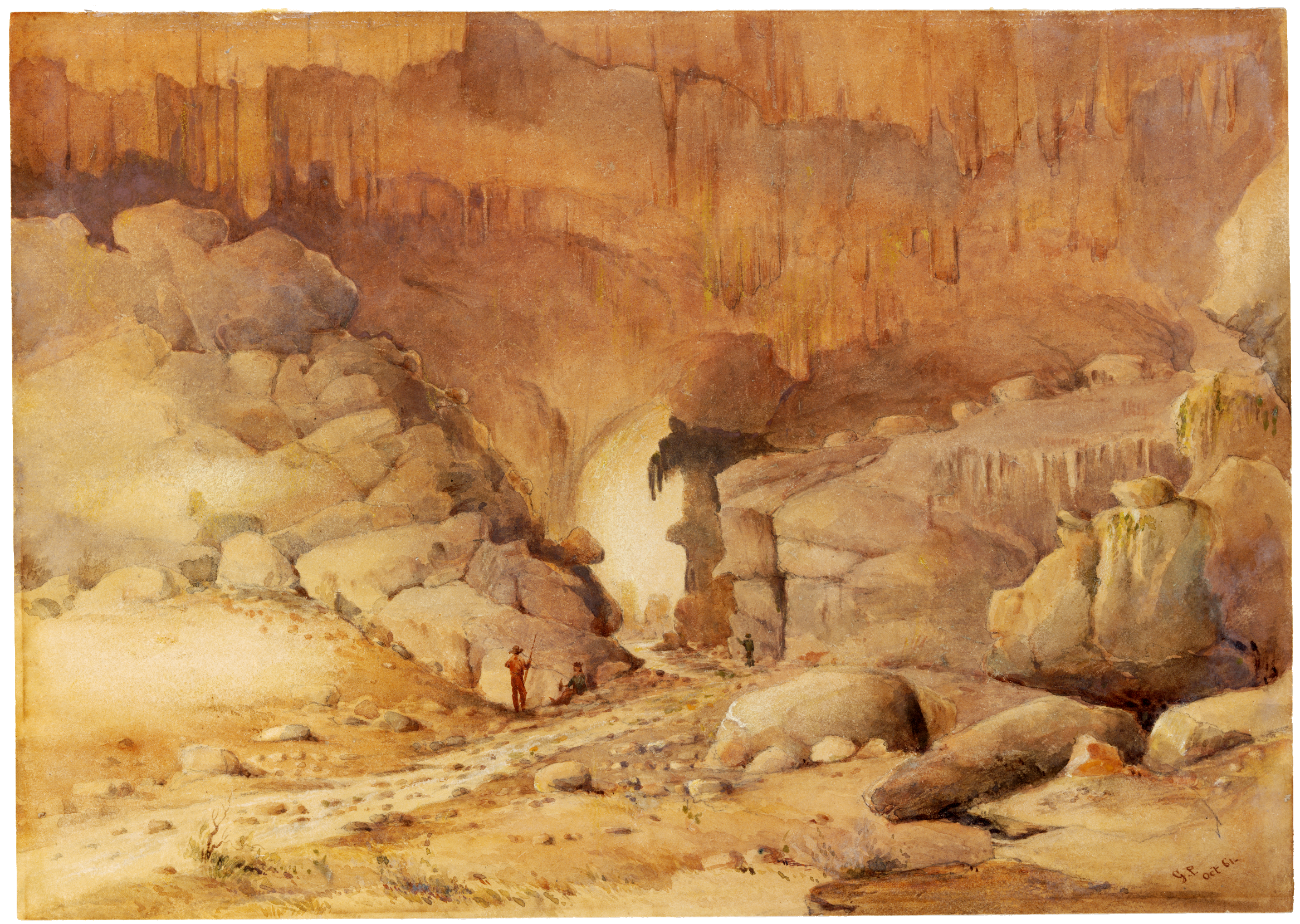
Possibly the earliest-surviving image of the Grand Arch of Jenolan Caves, known in 1861 as Fish River Caves

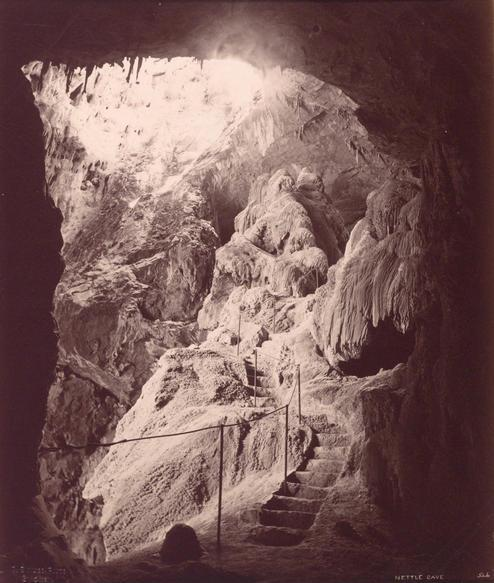
The entrance to Nettle Cave, circa 1888

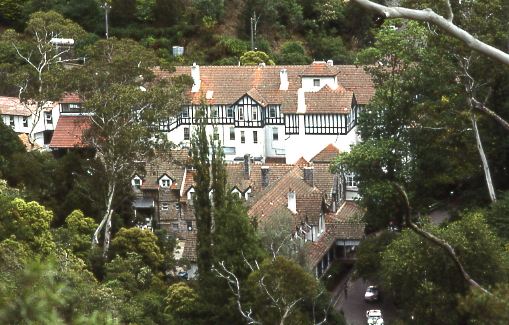
Caves House, Jenolan

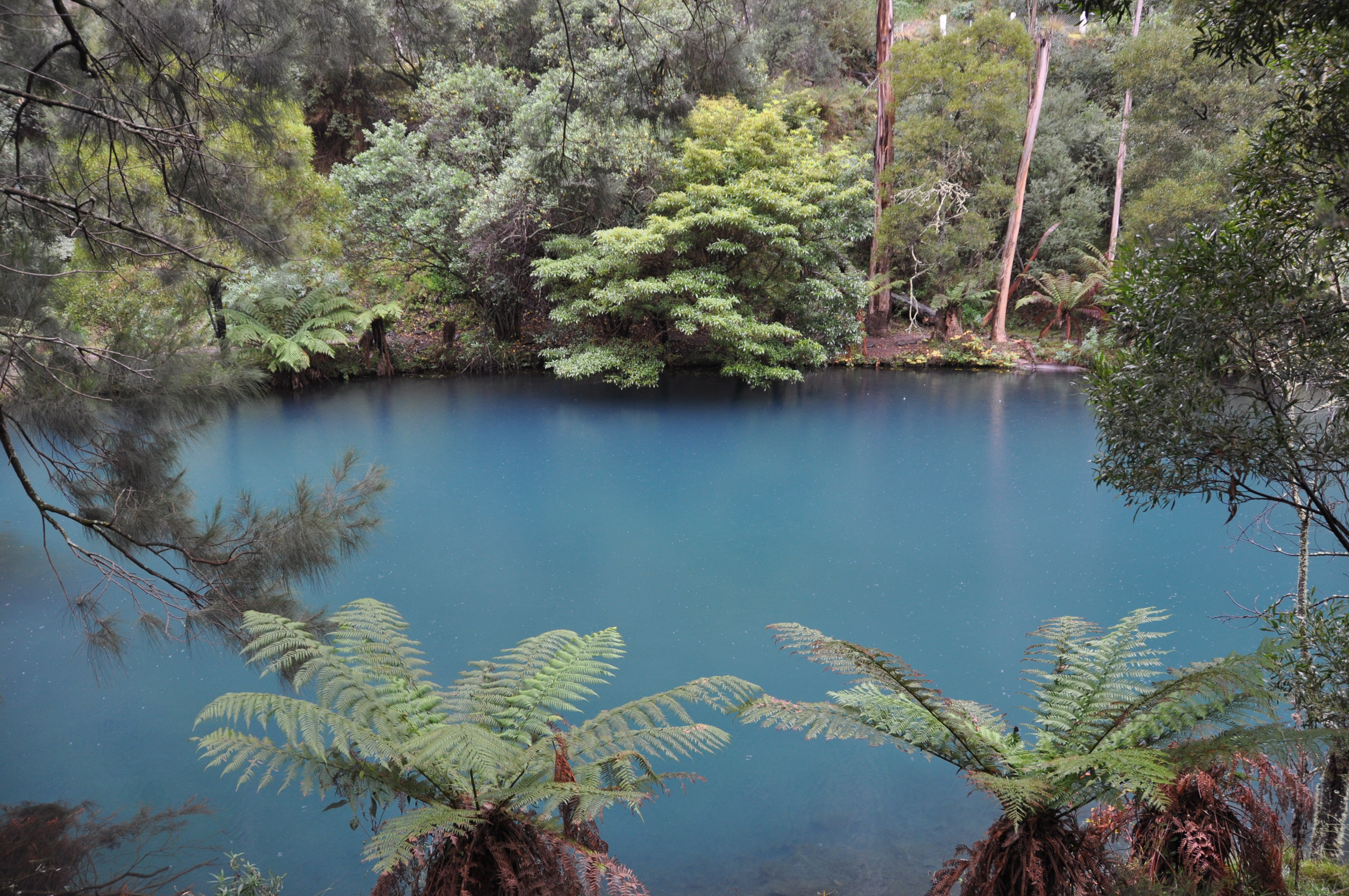
Blue Lake, Jenolan

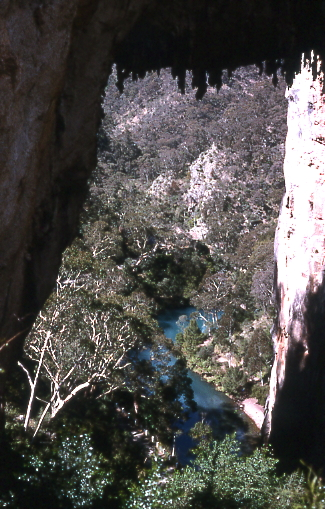
View through Carlotta Arch, Jenolan

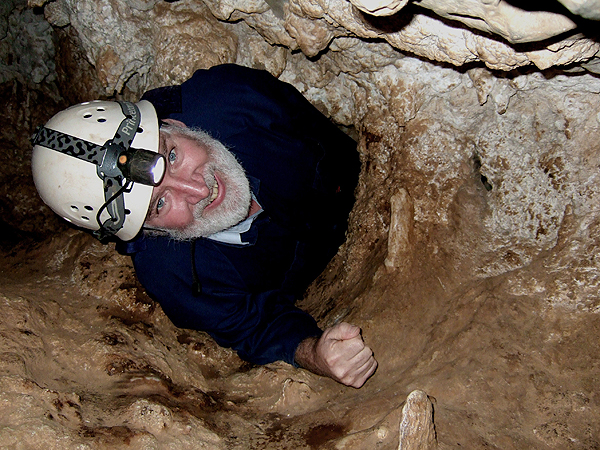
Challenge seekers can do adventure caving at Jenolan

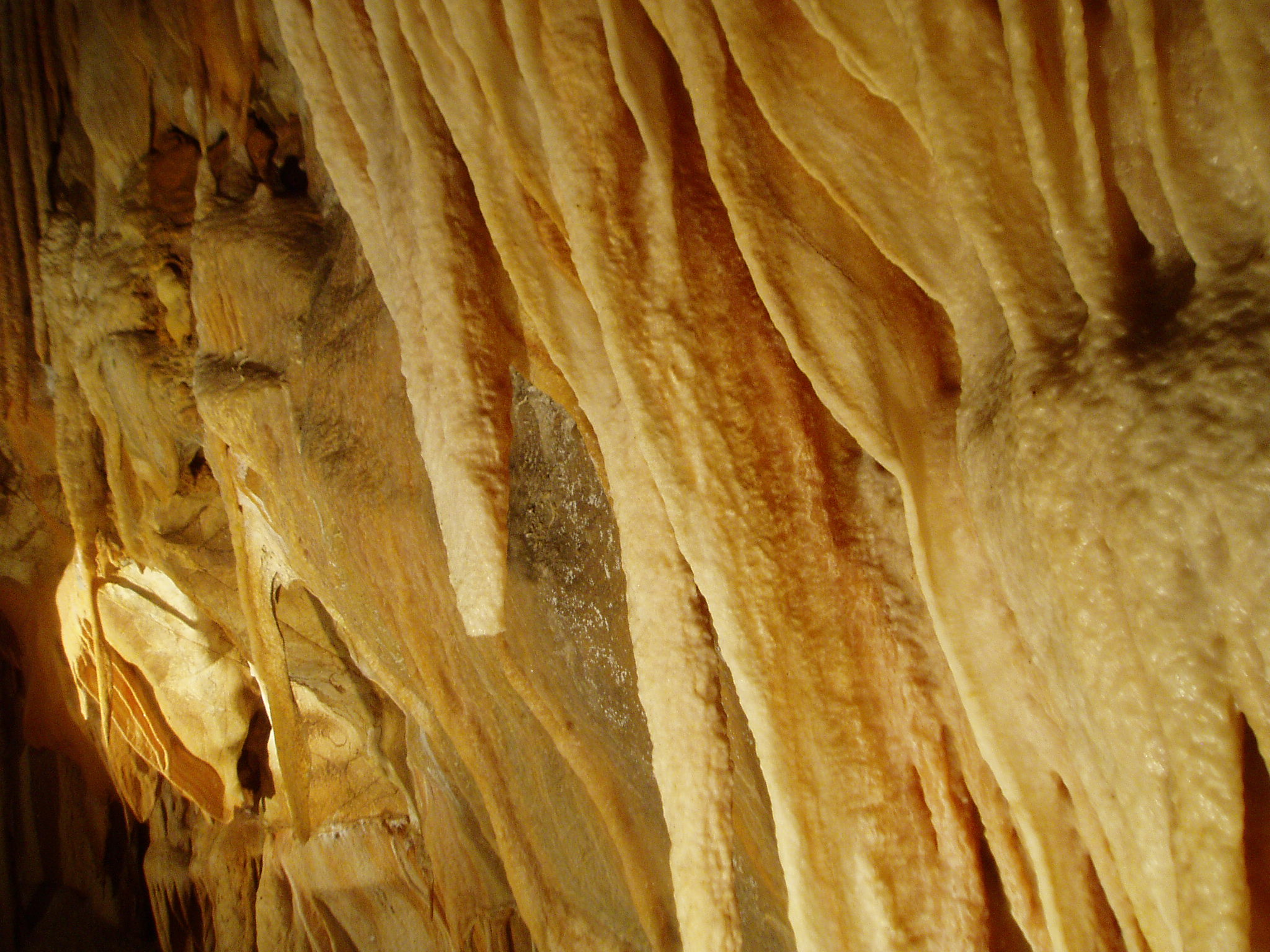
Small shawls

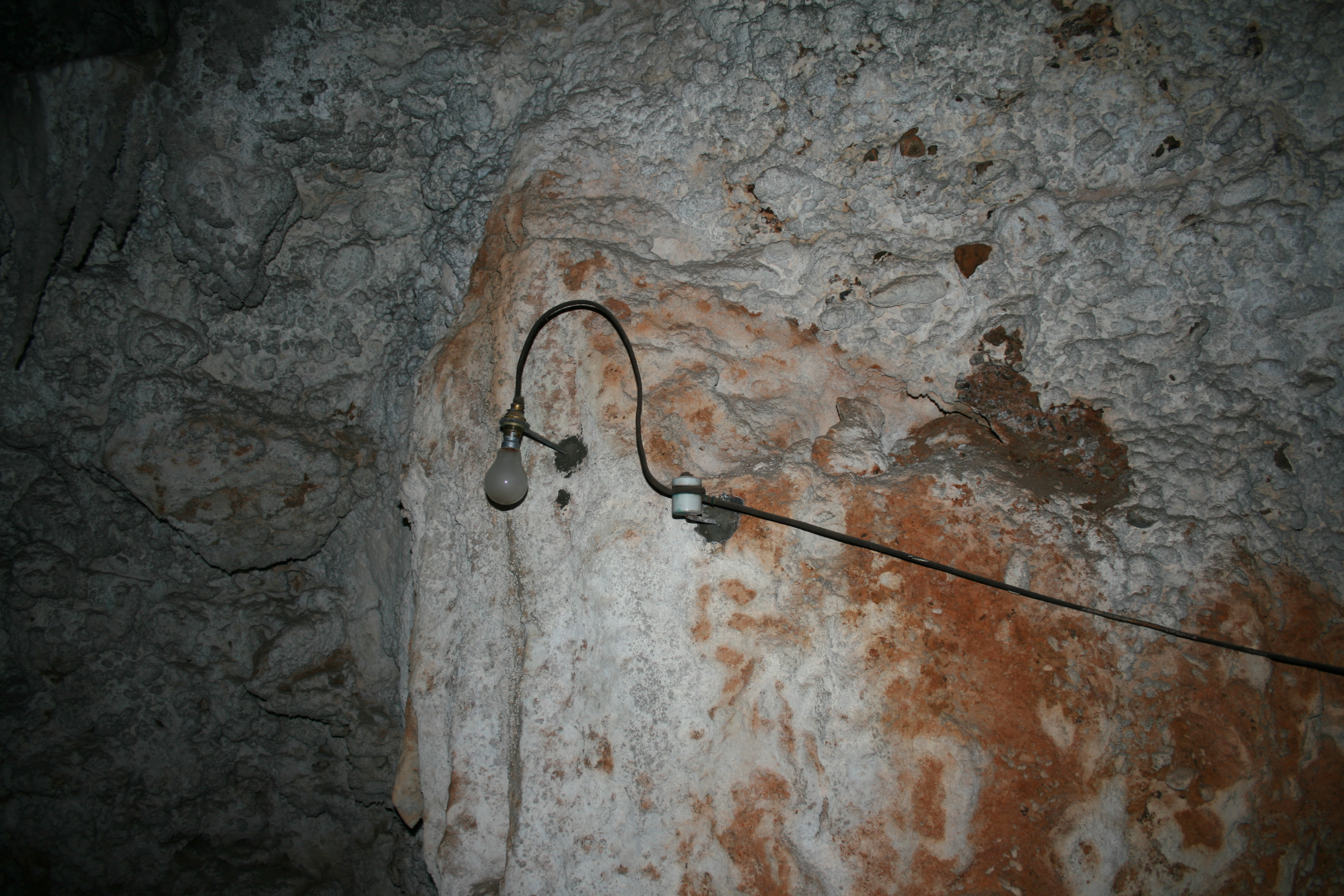
Remains of early electric lighting can still be seen

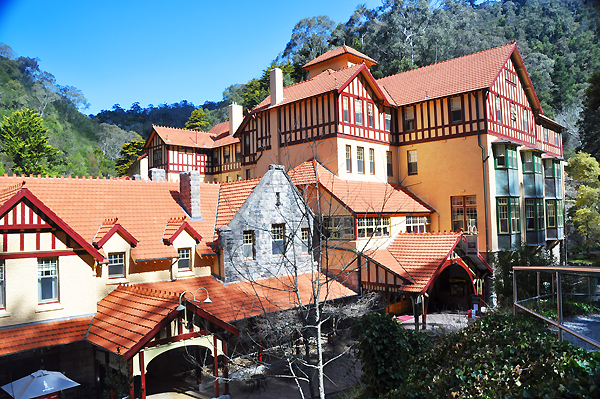
Historic hotel, Jenolan Caves House, offers a range of tourist accommodation

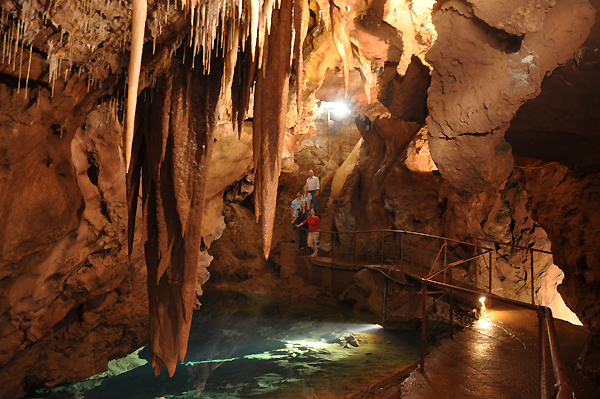
Jenolan offers a range of tourist show caves

== See also ==
- List of caves within the Jenolan Caves karst
- List of caves in New South Wales
- Protected areas of New South Wales
- Speleology
- Jenolan Caves Road
- Three Sisters (Australia)
