= Malachi Gilmore Memorial Hall =

Historic building in New South Wales, Australia

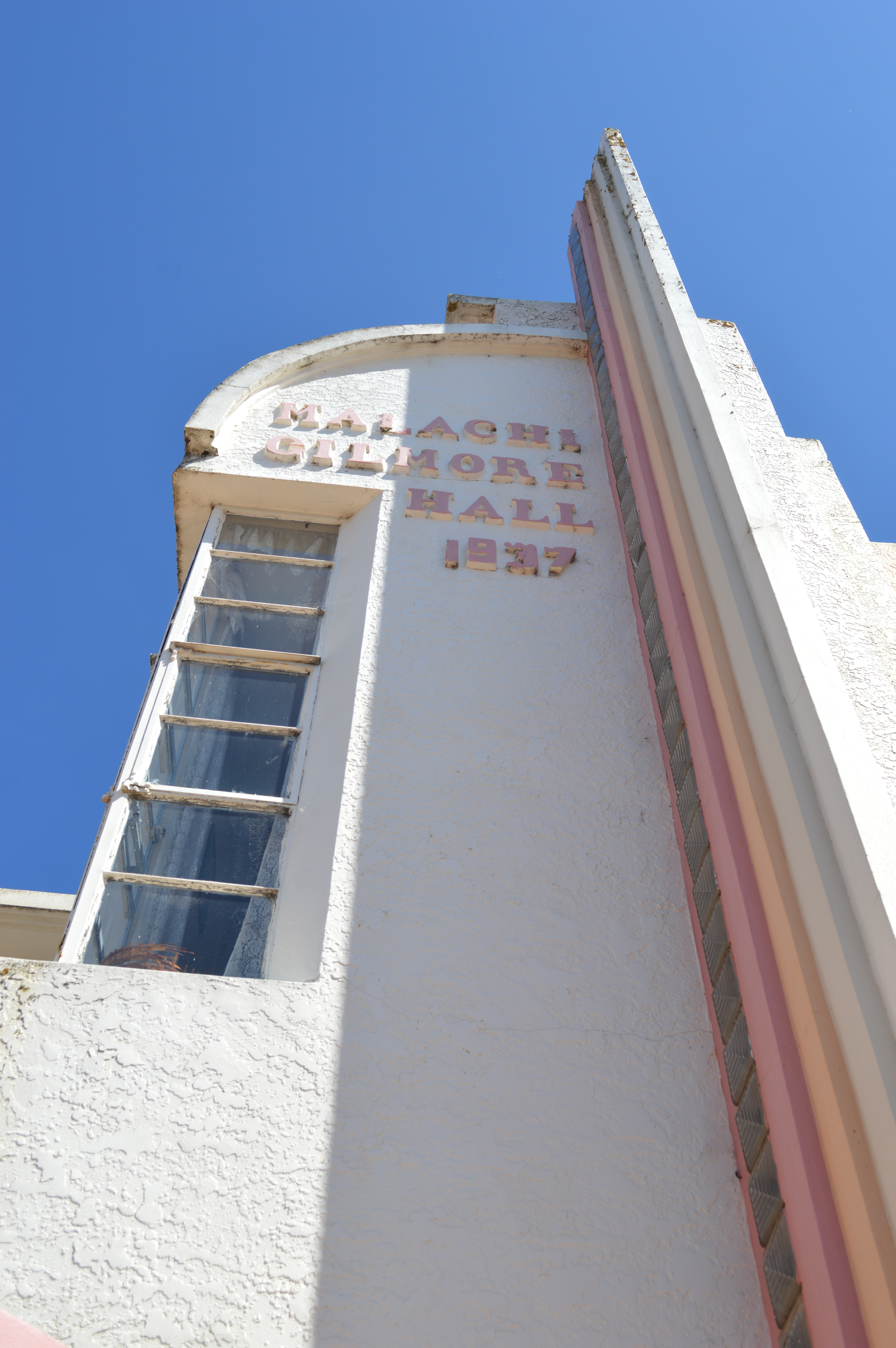
- Malachi Gilmore Memorial Hall in 2015.

- Location within New South Wales Location within Australia
- 33°42′16″S 149°51′26″E
- Location: 124 Oberon Street, Oberon, Oberon Shire, New South Wales, Australia

History
- Built: 1936–1937
- Built for: Catholic Church

Site notes
- Architects: Agabiti & Millane: Bolton Millane, or; Virgil Cizzio
- Architectural style: Inter-war Art Deco

New South Wales Heritage Register
- Official name: Malachi Gilmore Memorial Hall; Magna Theatre (1950s)
- Type: State heritage (built)
- Designated: 5 December 2003
- Reference no.: 1680
- Type: Public hall
- Category: Community Facilities
- Builders: H. A. Taylor

The Malachi Gilmore Memorial Hall is a heritage-listed former cinema and dance hall and now multi-use arts space at 124 Oberon Street, Oberon, Oberon Shire, New South Wales, Australia. It was designed by Virgil Cizzio or Bolton Millane from the firm of Agabiti & Millane and built from 1936 to 1937 by H. A. Taylor. It was also known as the Magna Theatre during the 1950s. The property is privately owned. It was added to the New South Wales State Heritage Register on 5 December 2003.

== History ==
The Malachi Gilmore Memorial Hall was built in 1936-1937 by the local Oberon Catholic Church on land donated by the Gilmore family, a prominent local pioneer family.

Malachi Gilmore (c. 1844-1921) immigrated from Ireland c. 1872 when he was 38 years old. His brother, Michael Gilmore, had a property near Oberon and Malachi was a frequent visitor who helped run the property after his brother's death, although it appears he never actually lived in Oberon. He did buy a large block of land in the centre of town. He died in Redfern in 1921 aged 77. In 1936 his descendants subdivided his land and gave a large town allotment to the Catholic Church for the purpose of building a community hall.

Construction of the hall was organised by Rev Dr Gummer and funded by money raised by the local community. The architect was Bolton Millane or Virgil Cizzio of Agabiti & Millane, a Sydney architectural firm known for their work for the Catholic Church. The builder was H. A. Taylor, also of Sydney. Curiously, the hall was built in reverse to the architect's plans. Construction began in August 1936 and was completed in 1937. Local red bricks from the Bathurst Brick Company were used to build the hall. The building was designed as both a community hall and cinema with a capacity to seat 500 people. It was officially opened on 22 February 1937.

The first lessee was probably Les Anstiss, who showed movies on Wednesday and Saturday nights. The business was later taken over by Herb David, a local film collector who also took a travelling movie show to Rockley. Movies continued to be shown until the 1970s. From 1937 to 1977, the hall was also the venue for numerous local balls, dances, civic receptions and amateur theatricals, thus playing a central role in the social and cultural life of the town. Local historian Philippa Gemmell-Smith, who was commissioned in 2002 by Oberon Council to write a thematic history of the area, states,

"I am impressed by the enormous significance the building had in the social life of Oberon. The local people were extremely isolated by poor roads and poverty until the 1950s and the social life of the town revolved around this building".

In 1964 the Catholic Church offered the hall to the Oberon Shire Council, which declined the offer. The next year, long-term lessee Herb David bought the hall and renamed it the Magna Theatre. Following the death of Herb David, Oberon Shire Council again declined to buy the hall.

In 1985 the Malachi Gilmore Memorial Hall was purchased by Betta Wool which uses the hall as a storage site for wool and leases the front, foyer section to an arts and crafts shop. In 1987 the facade was restored, attracting a "Heritage and Conservation Award" on 7 April 1987, "Presented to Betta Wool Handlers by R. J. Clough, local member for Bathurst" (according to the framed certificate hanging in the office).

A Flickerfest Short Film Festival was held on the premises in 2001. The Oberon Council's Community Based Heritage Study named the Malachi Gilmore Hall as one of the two best-known buildings in the district.

At the time of the opening of the Malachi Gilmore Memorial Hall a description of the Hall was reported as follows:

The Malachi Gilmore Memorial Hall recently completed at Oberon has for its architectural basis the famous Pharos pylon of Alexandria. This historical pylon had a height of 460 feet. It was built by Sostratus of Cynidus. The architects of the Oberon Hall conceived the idea of making it a minor replica of the Pharos pylon. This design was accepted by the parish priest (Dr. A.J. Gummers[?]) and the representatives of the late Malachi Gilmore, who was a native of Ireland. This was a startlingly bold design, but now that the hall has been completed it is a really beautiful building without being in the least incongruous. It is one of the architectural landmarks not merely of the town, but also of the whole district between the Blue Mountains and Lithgow. Tourists admire the bold outlines of the new building. Many, ignorant of the antiquity of the design (the Pharos tower was supposed to have been erected 283BC, and was favourably commented on by Pliny and Strabo, ancient historians), regard it as ultra modern in conception. An old hall adjoining emphasises the bold outlines of the new building. A striking feature of the front of the new building is the use of glass bricks supplied by the Australian Glass Company, Sydney. The remainder of the building is stoutly built in brick and concrete. The hall measures 110 feet by 40 feet. It is used mainly for Roman Catholic social functions. . . Mr H. A. Taylor, Sydney, was the builder of the hall."

— The Sydney Morning Herald, 1937.

It was purchased by new owners in 2017, who sought to renovate the building to use for its original purpose. It was restored with the assistance of funding from the New South Wales Government, and reopened in 2019 as a multi-use arts space.

== Description ==
The Malachi Gilmore Memorial Hall occupies a prominent position in the main street of Oberon. Its asymmetrical façade is a striking Inter-war Art Deco addition to the streetscape of Oberon Street and the town generally.

The façade is rendered concrete with a complex massing of curving and rectangular shapes presenting a stepped skyline to the street. The emphasis is generally horizontal except for a central portion with a vertical pier rising to a height of nearly 14 metres. The metal-framed windows create a grid-like pattern and are stepped in size and proportion to match the stepped façade. Glass bricks form a large curved wall. The building's name is rendered in stylized lettering on the façade.

The interior of the façade section of the building is largely intact and contains a foyer with fireplace, gallery, cloak rooms, bio-box and rewinding rooms at the front. In the main hall the walls are decorated with plasterwork, with some original Morene Art stucco work. The flooring of the foyer and main hall is West Australian jarrah hardwood. Under the main hall is another floor with slab concrete flooring supporting "supper rooms" and opening at ground level onto the large parking area at the rear of the property. The foyer is approximately 65 square metres (700 sq ft) and the hall has 279 square metres (3000 sq ft) of dancing space. Curiously, the hall was built in reverse of the architect's plans.

Some major, although not structural changes were made during the 1980s, disconnecting the façade from the main hall section of the building. A stud wall now blocks the view that was formerly available from an upstairs viewing area onto the main hall (this viewing area has been converted in part to an office and in part left as open space). Similarly a stud wall blocks the view that was formerly available from the mezzanine level projection room into the main hall. At the time of renovation two new bathrooms were built in the façade section. A section of the stage in the main hall section was also cut out to make room for an elevator to convey goods from the rear parking area.

Thorne, Tod and Cork point out that one of the building's eccentricities is that "the auditorium does not match the façade in any way. The former is a rather plain country hall with a stage, proscenium, stalls and small gallery" (1996, 302). According to Scott Robinson of the NSW Art Deco Society, "The Malchi Gilmore Hall is a most unusual combination of a diminiative (sic) Modern "picture palace" front (with its vertical fin and roof) and Modern Movement rectiliniarity of the stepped massing of the building behind the front" (quoted in the Heritage Inventory nomination form submitted by the Friends of the Malachi Gilmore Hall, 2001). Ross Thorne's 1983 "Theatres/Cinemas in NSW" states that the exterior of the hall is "unique in a kind of west-coast USA 1930s design style with a vague Frank Lloyd Wright influence produced by the feeling of horizontality (in parts). It also has a very strong vertical element at the front, and glass bricks in the manner of Depression Modern". Thorne, Tod and Cork's "Movie Theatre Heritage Register" states, "there is nothing quite like it elsewhere in New South Wales. Even by today's standards, the building is unusual and futuristic" (1996, 302).

The architectural significance of the hall has been widely recognised and is reflected in the large number of heritage listings: Oberon Shire Council LEP, RAIA Register of Twentieth Century Buildings, the Register of the National Trust of Australia (NSW), the Register of the Art Deco Society, and Ross Thorne's Movie Theatre Heritage Register.

=== Modifications and dates ===
The building was completed in 1937. The façade was restored in 1987.

At some stage the original supper room and kitchen were converted into a stage and lower section.

In 1985, following its purchase for use as a wool store, internal walls were constructed that divided the foyer from the main hall and also divided the balcony section from the main hall. A large hole was made in the stage to allow wool bales to be lowered into the section below, and two internal toilets were installed.

The building underwent a heritage restoration in 2017-19.

== Heritage listing ==
As at 12 February 2009, the Malachi Gilmore Memorial Hall was of state significance as an outstanding example of Interwar Art Deco architecture in regional New South Wales. Designed by the Sydney office of Agabiti & Millane and completed in 1937, the facade features curved walls and rooflines, geometric windows, glass bricks, an asymmetrical, stepped skyline and other 1930s "picture palace" details. Built on land donated to the Catholic Church by a pioneering settler family, with funds raised by the congregation, it served as a community centre for the entire Oberon community between 1937 and 1977. The elaborate facade contrasts with the large "plain country hall" behind, which has low architectural significance but high social significance as an historic venue for numerous local balls, dances, civic receptions and amateur theatricals for 40 years. Situated in a prominent location in the main street of Oberon, the Malachi Gilmore Memorial Hall is a well-known local landmark and makes an important contribution to the streetscape.

Malachi Gilmore Memorial Hall was listed on the New South Wales State Heritage Register on 5 December 2003 having satisfied the following criteria.

The place is important in demonstrating the course, or pattern, of cultural or natural history in New South Wales.

The Malachi Gilmore Memorial Hall is of state significance as an outstanding example of Interwar Art Deco architecture in regional New South Wales. Built on land donated to the Catholic Church by Malachi Gilmmore's pioneering settler family, with funds raised by the congregation, it served as a community centre for the entire Oberon community between 1937 and 1977. As a venue for numerous local balls, dances, civic receptions and amateur theatricals for 40 years, it played a central role in the social and cultural life of Oberon.

The place has a strong or special association with a person, or group of persons, of importance of cultural or natural history of New South Wales's history.

The Malachi Gilmore Memorial Hall is of high local significance for its associations with the following people of note:

GILMORE FAMILY: prominent early settlers in Oberon and benefactors of the Catholic Church.

MILLANE AND AGABITI: Bolton Millane was the architect for the Malachi Gilmore Memorial Church. Millane and Agabiti were a Sydney design and architectural firm that specialised in church work, especially for the Catholic Church. Millane was a registered architect from 1924-1969 and Hamlet Agabiti, a designer of ecclesiastical interiors (altars, baldachinos etc). Little is known of the firm or the individual partners. Another known example of their work is the chapel at Our Lady of the Sacred Heart Convent, Kensington, (1937).

HERB DAVID: local cinema operator and long-term lessee and later owner of the Malachi Gilmore Memorial Hall.

The place is important in demonstrating aesthetic characteristics and/or a high degree of creative or technical achievement in New South Wales.

The Malachi Gilmore Memorial Hall is of state significance as an outstanding example of Interwar Art Deco architecture in regional New South Wales. Designed by Bolton Millane and completed in 1937, the hall features curved walls and rooflines, geometric windows, glass bricks, an asymmetrical, stepped façade and other 1930s "picture palace" details. The architectural significance of the hall has been widely recognised in heritage listings such as the Oberon Shire Council LEP, RAIA Register of Twentieth Century Buildings, the Register of the National Trust of Australia (NSW), the Register of the Art Deco Society, and Ross Thorne's Movie Theatre Heritage Register, where it is variously described as "unique", "unusual", "eccentric" and "futuristic". Situated in a prominent location in the main street of Oberon, the hall is a well-known local landmark and makes an important contribution to the streetscape.

The place has a strong or special association with a particular community or cultural group in New South Wales for social, cultural or spiritual reasons.

The Malachi Gilmore Memorial Hall is of high local significance as the venue for numerous local balls, dances, civic receptions and amateur theatricals, thus playing a central role in the social and cultural life of the town for 40 years between 1937 and 1977. The significance of the hall to the town is also demonstrated by its listing on the Oberon Shire Council LEP, the award-winning conservation works to its façade in 1987, and the formation of the Friends of the Malachi Gilmore Hall, a local community group who wish to return the hall to community uses.

The place has potential to yield information that will contribute to an understanding of the cultural or natural history of New South Wales.

The Malachi Gilmore Memorial Hall has some research significance in relation to the expression of Art Deco style in regional NSW including the typical use of rendered bricks, glass bricks, metal railings, ornate interior plaster and stucco work. The site is unlikely to display archaeological potential relating to former uses or occupation as it was the first building on the site and occupies most of the site.

The place possesses uncommon, rare or endangered aspects of the cultural or natural history of New South Wales.

The Malachi Gilmore Memorial Hall is of state significance as a rare and highly unusual example of the Interwar Art Deco style. It makes an important contribution to the history of the Art Deco movement in New South Wales. Following restoration of the façade in 1987, the building is intact, both internally and externally.

The place is important in demonstrating the principal characteristics of a class of cultural or natural places/environments in New South Wales.

The Malachi Gilmore Memorial Hall is of high local significance as an example of a community hall and cinema, many of which built in the early-to-mid twentieth century throughout Sydney and regional New South Wales. The hall interior is typical of country halls. Though representative as a building type, the Malachi Gilmore Memorial Hall is a highly unusual example because of the exuberance of the architectural detailing of its facade.

== See also ==
- Australian non-residential architectural styles
