= Fish River (Oberon) =

River in New South Wales, Australia

Fish River Fish River Creek
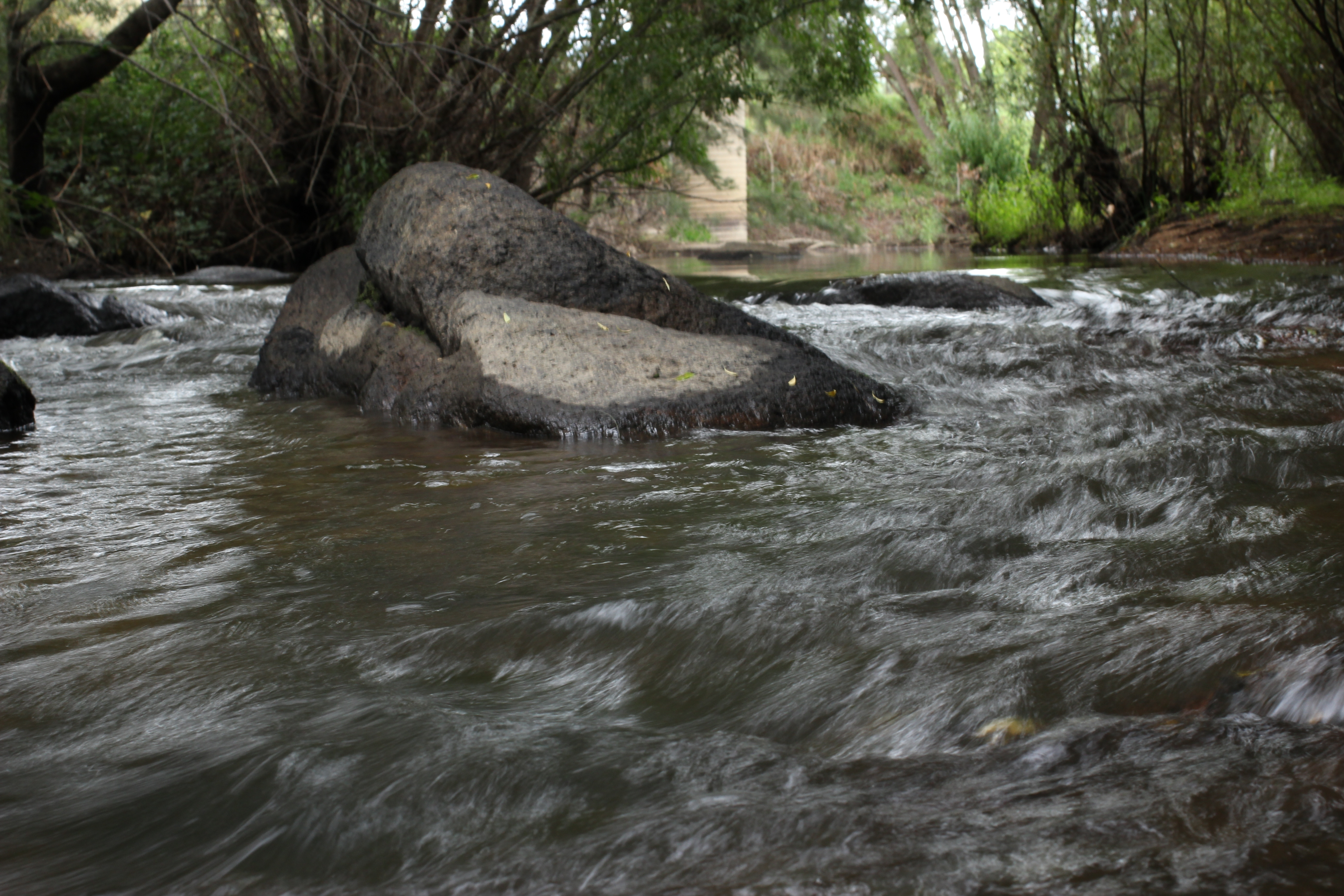
- Fish River, pictured near O'Connell, 2013
- Etymology: the amount of fish in the river

Location
- Country: Australia
- State: New South Wales
- IBRA: South Eastern Highlands
- District: Central West
- Municipality: Oberon

Physical characteristics
- Source
  - location: near Shooters Hill
  - elevation: 1,160 m (3,810 ft)
- Mouth: confluence with the Macquarie River
  - location: near White Rock
  - coordinates: 33°29′34″S 149°37′28″E
  - elevation: 668 m (2,192 ft)
- Length: 119 km (74 mi)

Basin features
- River system: Macquarie catchment, Murray–Darling basin
- Tributaries
  - left: Antonys Creek, Back Gully, Frying Pan Creek, Joseph Smiths Creek, King George Gully, Kings Stockyard Creek, Nicks Creek, Sawpit Creek, Sidmouth Valley Creek, Slippery Creek, Snakes Valley Creek, Springwater Creek, Stony Creek, Waterfall Creek
  - right: Burnt Creek, Deep Creek, Duckmaloi River, Dwyers Gully, Eusdale Creek, Harveys Gully, Hickory Gully, Honeysuckle Gully, Knoffs Creek, Long Arm Gully, Off Flats Creek, Saltwater Creek, Solitary Creek, Wickety War Creek
- Reservoir: Lake Oberon

Fish River, a perennial stream that is part of the Macquarie catchment within the Murray–Darling basin, is located in the central western district of New South Wales, Australia. The Fish River is in Wiradjuri country and its indigenous name is Wambuul, which means "winding river".

The Fish River rises on the plateau south east of Oberon, and flows generally to the north-west, becoming the main headwater of the Macquarie River. It merges with Campbells River, just east of Bathurst, forming the Macquarie River. The river is impounded by a reservoir near Oberon which supplies water for the region. The Fish River descends 493 metres (1,617 ft) over its 119 kilometres (74 mi) course.

The Fish River was given its name by George Evans in 1813, because of the large number of fish they found in it, being a rare permanent stream.

== See also ==
- Rivers of New South Wales
