= Oberon Council =

- Local government area
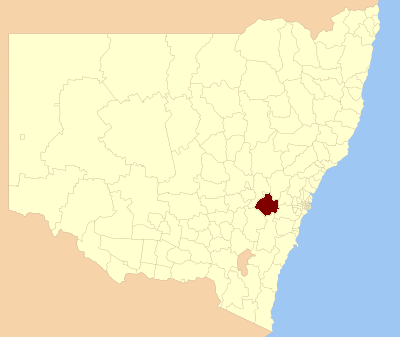
- Location in New South Wales

- Interactive map of Oberon Council
- Coordinates: 33°43′S 149°52′E
- Country: Australia
- State: New South Wales
- Region: Central West
- Council seat: Oberon

Government
  - Mayor: Andrew McKibbin (Independent)
  - State electorate: Bathurst
  - Federal division: Calare

Area
  - Total: 3,659 km^{2} (1,413 sq mi)

Population
  - Total: 5,580 (2021 census)
  - Density: 1.5250/km^{2} (3.950/sq mi)
- Website: Oberon Council
LGAs around Oberon Council
Bathurst	Bathurst	Lithgow
Bathurst	Oberon Council	Blue Mountains
Upper Lachlan	Upper Lachlan	Wollondilly

Oberon Council is a local government area in the Central West region of New South Wales, Australia.

The mayor of Oberon Council is Andrew McKibbin, an independent politician.

== Localities ==
Oberon Council includes the towns and villages of Oberon, Black Springs, Shooters Hill, Edith, O'Connell, Hazelgrove, Mount David, Jenolan and Burraga. It also includes the minor localities of Arkstone, Duckmaloi, Essington, Isabella and Porters Retreat.

== Heritage listings ==
The Oberon Council has a number of heritage-listed sites, including:

- Jenolan Caves Road: Jenolan Caves
- Lindlegreen Barn O'Connell
- O'Connell Hotel
- 6 Foot Track.
- Yerranderie.
- Oberon, 124 Oberon Street: Malachi Gilmore Memorial Hall
- Ramsgate Cottage.
- Oberon, Tarana-Oberon railway: Oberon railway station

== Demographics ==
According to the Australian Bureau of Statistics there:

- were 5,503 people as at 30 June 2006, the 125th largest Local Government Area in New South Wales. It was equal to less than 0.1% of the New South Wales population of 6,827,694
- was an increase of 60 people over the year to 30 June 2006, the 99th largest population growth in a Local Government Area in New South Wales. It was equal to 0.1% of the 58,753 increase in the population of New South Wales
- was, in percentage terms, an increase of 1.1% in the number of people over the year to 30 June 2006, the 41st fastest growth in population of a Local Government Area in New South Wales. In New South Wales the population grew by 0.9%
- was an increase in population over the 10 years to 30 June 2006 of 648 people or 13% (1.3% in annual average terms), the 32nd highest rate of a Local Government Area in New South Wales. In New South Wales the population grew by 622,966 or 10% (1.0% in annual average terms) over the same period.

== Council ==
=== Current composition and election method ===
Oberon Council is composed of nine councillors elected proportionally as a single ward. All councillors are elected for a fixed term of office. The mayor is elected by the councillors at the first meeting of the council for a 2-year term. The most recent election was held on 4 December 2021. The makeup of the council is as follows:

Party	Councillors
Independents and Unaligned	9
Total	9

The current Council, elected in 2021, in order of result is:

Councillor	Party	Notes
Mark Kellam	Independent	Mayor
Clive McCarthy	Unaligned	
Ian Tucker	Unaligned	
Katy Graham	Independent	
Lauren Trembath	Independent	
Andrew McKibbin	Unaligned	
Mick McKechnie	Unaligned	
Bruce Watt	Independent	
Helen Hayden	Unaligned	

== Election results ==
=== 2024 ===
2024 New South Wales local elections: Oberon
Party	Candidate	Votes	%	±%
Independent	1. Francis O'Connor (elected); 2. Jill O'Grady (elected); 3. Robert Coulter (Ind. Nat); 4. Michael Cyre; 5. Robert Lee; 6. Brenda Lyon; 7. Tatiana Coulter; 8. Raymond Fitzpatrick; 9. Robert Snoch	1,029	31.0	
Independent	Clive McCarthy (elected)	420	12.7	−0.8
Independent	Katie Graham (elected)	382	11.5	+2.1
Independent	Andrew McKibbin (elected)	328	9.9	+2.2
Independent	Helen Hayden (elected)	321	9.7	+4.9
Independent	Lauren Trembath (elected)	259	7.8	+1.0
Independent	Anthony Alevras (elected)	246	7.4	
Independent	Ian Tucker (elected)	186	5.6	−5.4
Independent	Irene Bishop	85	2.6	
Independent	William Memory	62	1.9	
Total formal votes		3,318	93.4	
Informal votes		236	6.6	
Turnout		3,554	88.2	

=== 2021 ===
2021 New South Wales local elections: Oberon
Party	Candidate	Votes	%	±%
Independent	Mark Kellam (elected)	570	17.7	
Independent	Clive McCarthy (elected)	435	13.5	
Independent	Ian Tucker (elected)	352	10.9	
Independent	Katy Graham (elected)	301	9.4	
Independent	Mick McKechnie (elected)	252	7.8	
Independent	Andrew McKibbin (elected)	249	7.7	
Independent	Lauren Trembath (elected)	220	6.8	
Independent	Bruce Watt (elected)	213	6.6	
Independent	Helen Hayden (elected)	155	4.8	
Independent	Sig Sovik	143	4.4	
Independent	Neil Francis	121	3.8	
Independent	Gregory Bourne	113	3.5	
Independent	Margaret Kilby	91	2.8	
Total formal votes		3,215	95.5	
Informal votes		153	4.5	
Turnout		3,368	84.4	
