= Hampton, New South Wales =

Hampton New South Wales
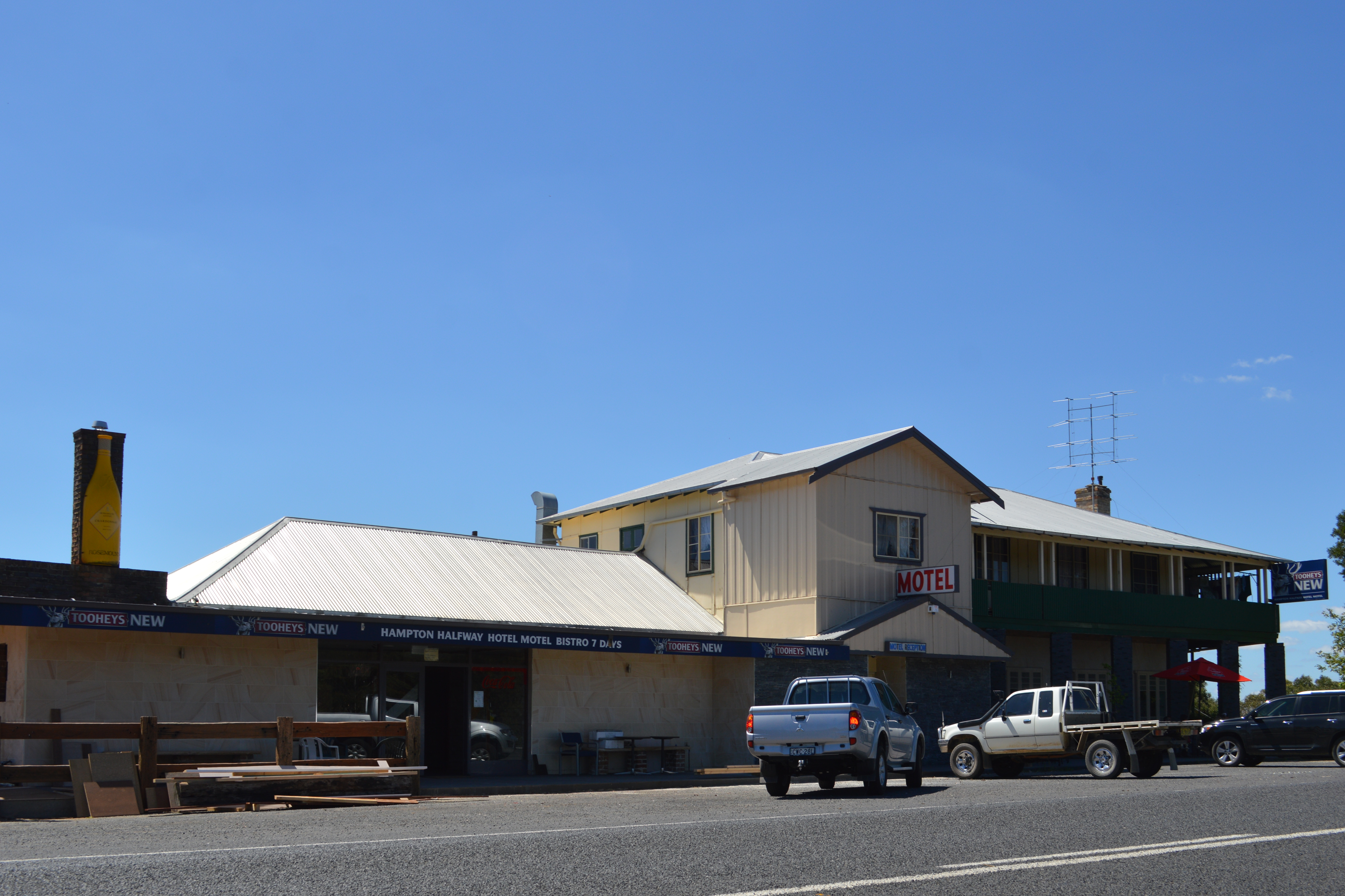
- Halfway Hotel Motel in Hampton

- Coordinates: 33°39′S 150°03′E
- Population: 104 (2016 census)
- Postcode(s): 2790
- Location: 148 km (92 mi) W of Sydney; 27 km (17 mi) s of Lithgow
- LGA(s): City of Lithgow
- State electorate(s): Bathurst
- Federal division(s): Calare

Hampton is a locality in the Central West region of New South Wales, Australia.

== Geography ==
The locality is in the City of Lithgow local government area, 148 kilometres (92 mi) west of the state capital, Sydney.

== Demographics ==
At the 2016 census, Hampton had a population of 104.
