= Oberon, New South Wales =

Oberon
- Town
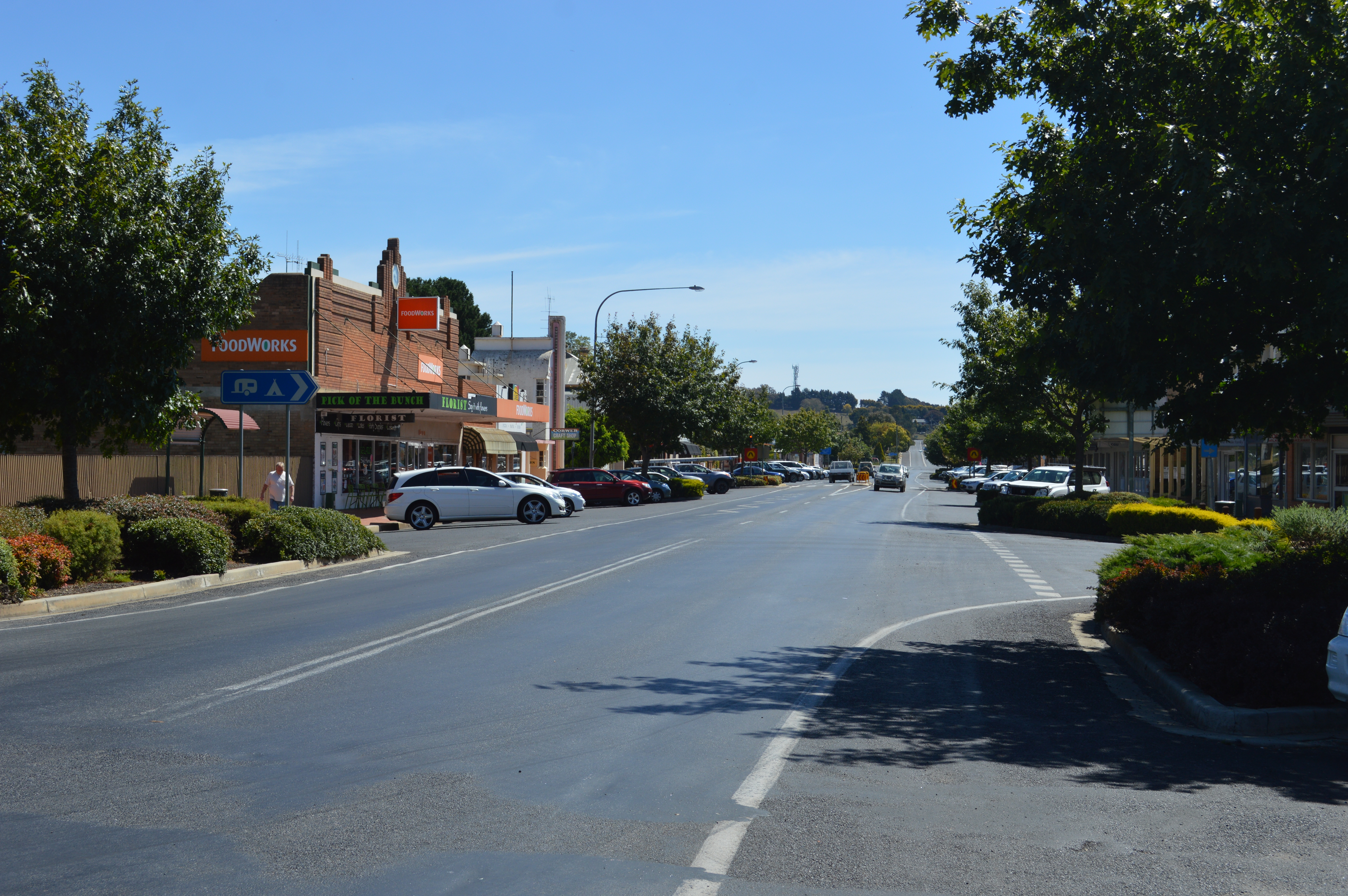
- Oberon Street, the high street of Oberon

- Coordinates: 33°43′S 149°52′E
- Country: Australia
- State: New South Wales
- LGA: Oberon Council
- Location: 187 km (116 mi) W of Sydney; 49 km (30 mi) SE of Bathurst; 143 km (89 mi) N of Goulburn

Government
  - State electorate: Bathurst
  - Federal division: Calare
- Elevation: 1,113 m (3,652 ft)

Population
  - Total: 3,319 (2021 census)
- Postcode: 2787
- County: Westmoreland
- Mean max temp: 16.8 °C (62.2 °F)
- Mean min temp: 5.2 °C (41.4 °F)
- Annual rainfall: 842.9 mm (33.19 in)

Oberon is a town located within the Oberon Council local government area, in the Central Tablelands region of New South Wales, Australia. The main industries are farming, forestry and wood products. The town usually receives snowfall during the winter months, owing to its high elevation. At the 2021 census, Oberon had a population of 3,319 people.

It is the birthplace of Greens politician Bob Brown and journalist Ken Sutcliffe, State Motocross rider Scott Saul and former Penrith Panthers players Ray Blacklock and Mark Booth. Oberon is located near Jenolan Caves and the Kanangra-Boyd National Park.

== History ==
The town was permanently settled in 1839, originally named Bullocks Flat, until it was renamed to Oberon in 1863. Gold was discovered on the Fish River in 1823, leading to a population boost in the area. The Oberon Council was formed in 1906. The Fish River Creek Post Office opened on 1 January 1855 and was renamed Oberon in 1866.

== Heritage listings ==
Oberon has a number of heritage-listed sites, including:

- Blue Mountains National Park: Blue Mountains walking tracks
- 124 Oberon Street: Malachi Gilmore Memorial Hall
- Tarana-Oberon railway: Oberon railway station
- Caves Road: Jenolan Caves

== Commercial area ==
Oberon's main streets are Carrington Avenue–Oberon Street and Ross Street. The town has several parks and sports facilities. Such parks include the Oberon Showground, Cunynghame Oval, and Apex Park. Oberon also has a museum on North Street. Oberon has a caravan park on Cunynghame Street off North Street, a hospital on North Street, a camping ground adjacent to the caravan park and a wood gallery on Oberon Street. Rotary Lookout is located on Abercrombie Road and to the east of the town is the Blenheim State Forest which includes walking tracks.

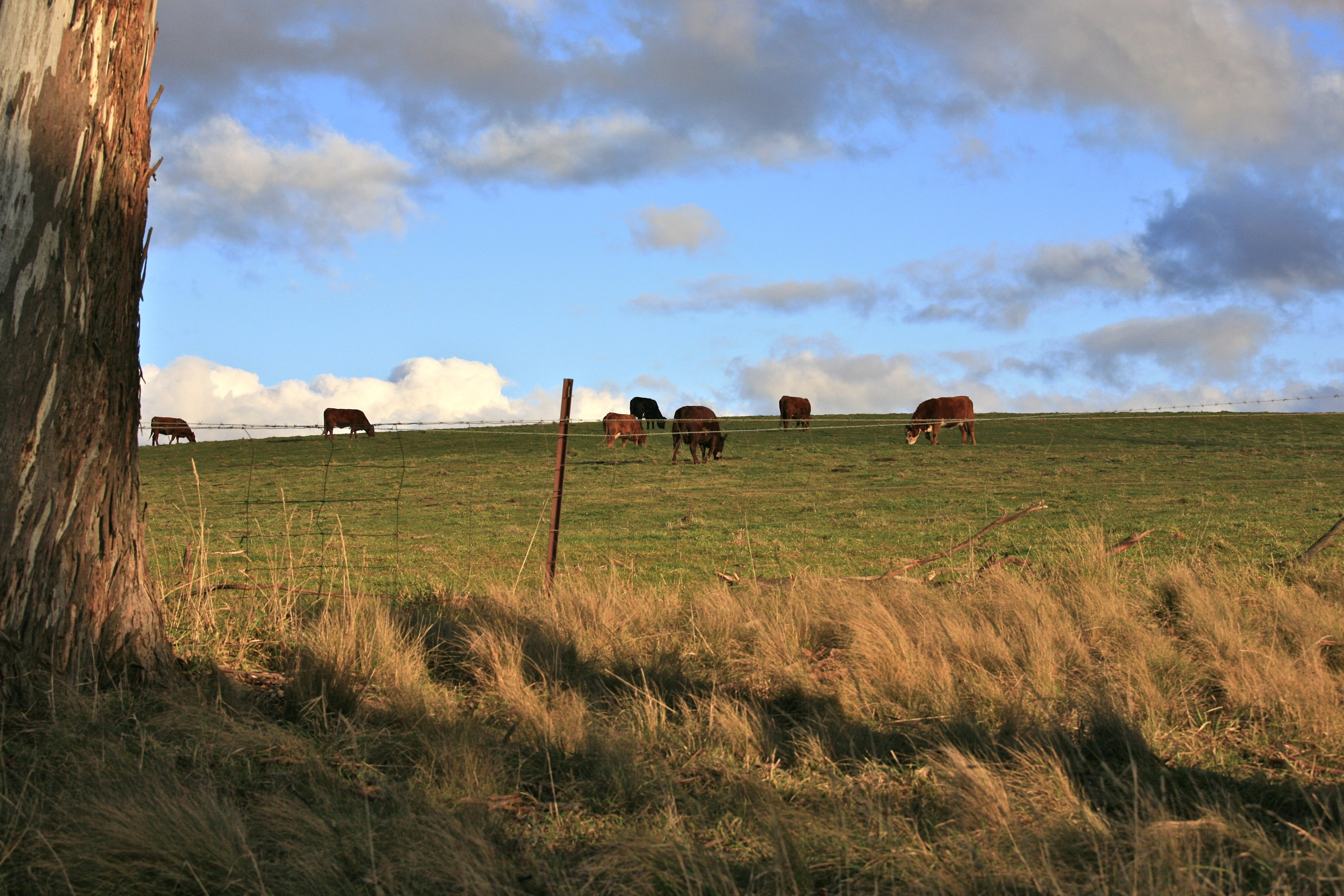
Cows grazing in Oberon

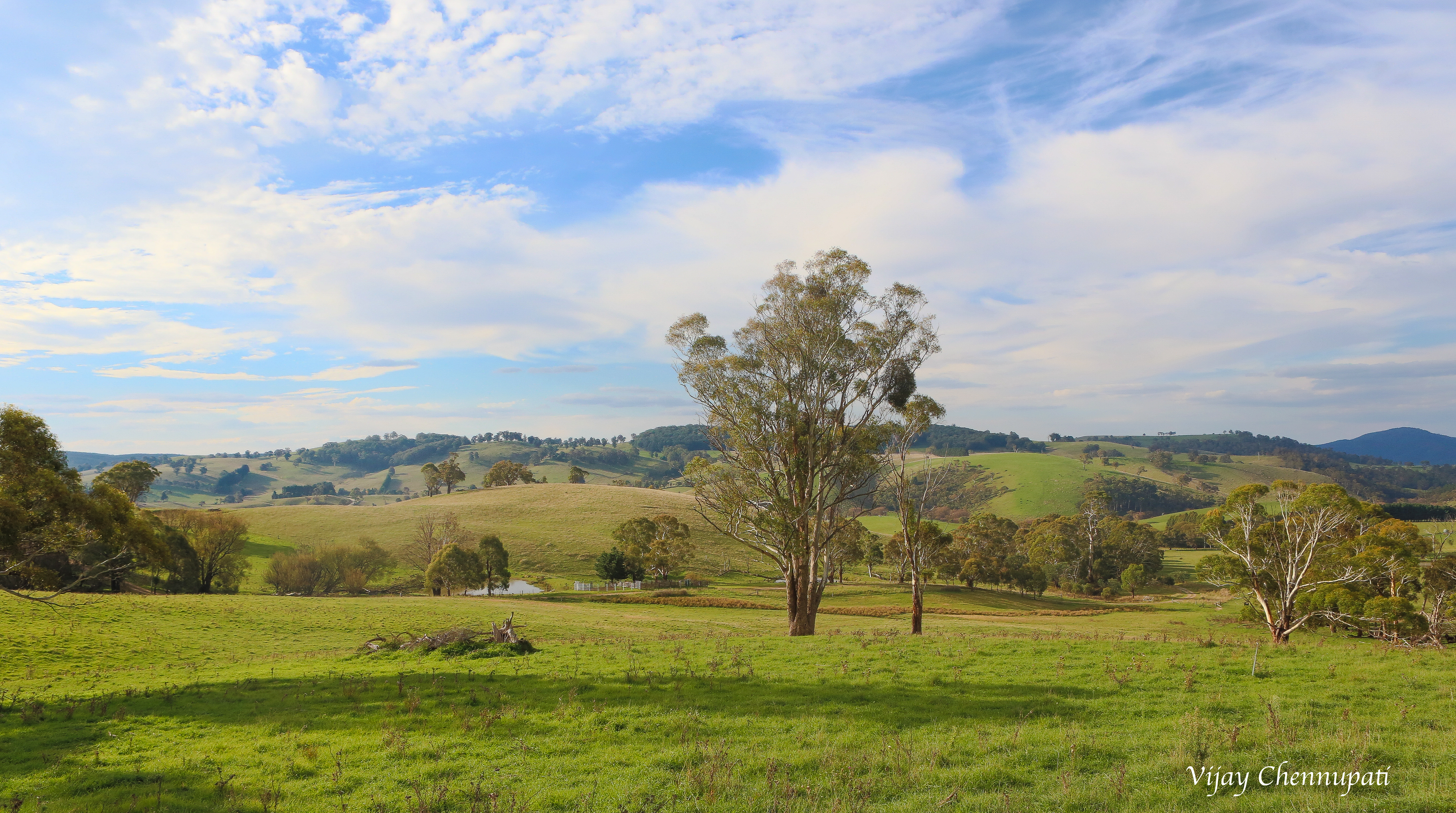
Fields in Oberon

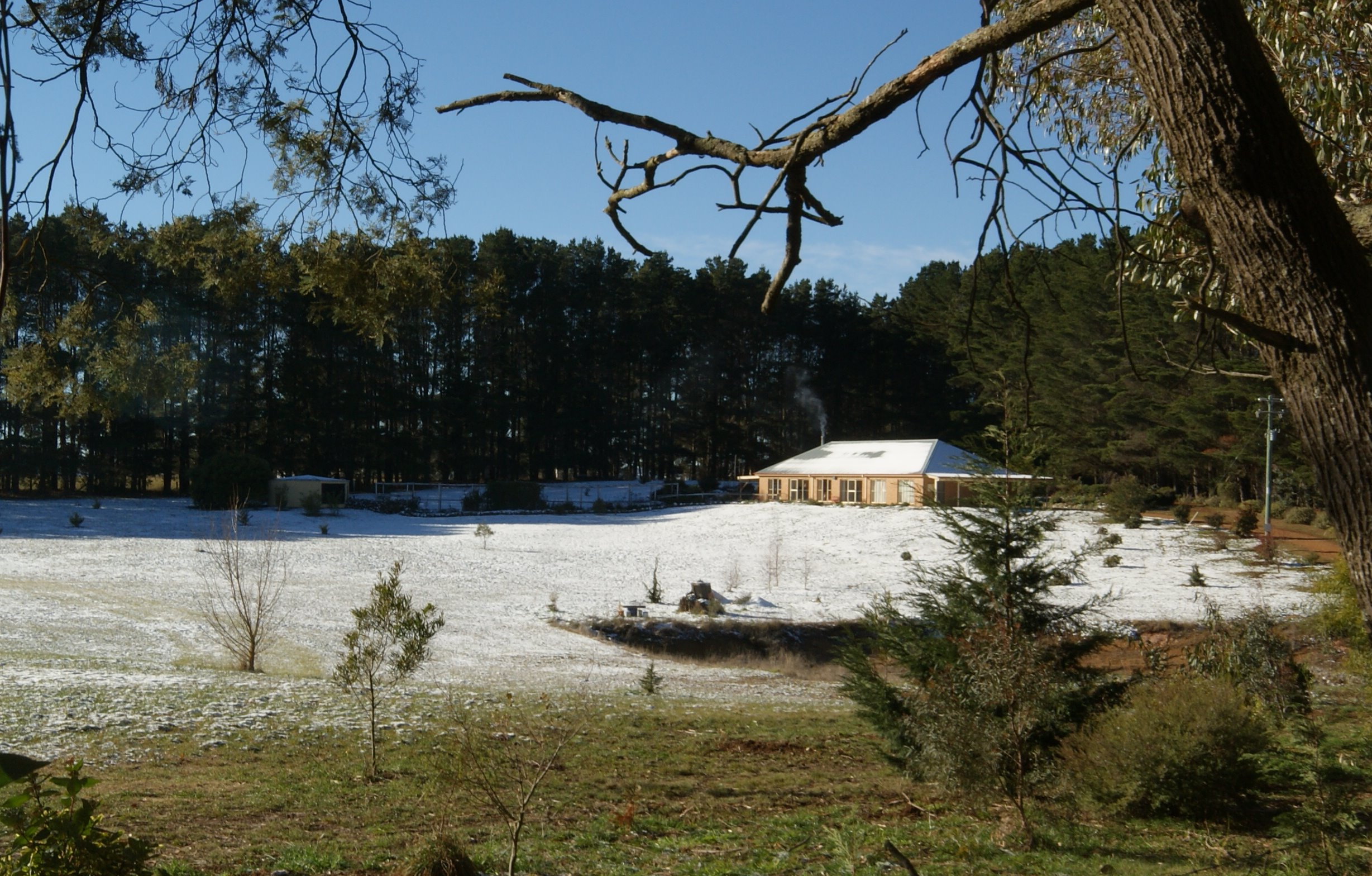
Oberon after a light snowfall event

== Culture ==
Fishing is a pastime possible at Lake Oberon and The Reef Reserve. Oberon also has a golf club off Hume Street.

South of the town is Lake Oberon, Oberon Dam and the Fish River. There is a picnic area at the dam and a reserve with walking tracks near the lake.

Rugby league football coach Craig Bellamy started his playing career with Oberon Tigers team in the 1970s.

Mayfield Garden is a popular botanical garden that covers 16 hectares (40 acres) of land. It is open daily, except on public holidays and there is an entry fee.

== In popular culture ==
The video for the pub rock band Cold Chisel song "Flame Trees" was filmed in Oberon. The video, directed by Kimble Rendall, portrays a young man returning to his home town, meeting old friends, and remembering a past lover. The members of Cold Chisel have bit parts, except for Jimmy Barnes, who only appears courtesy of some footage from The Last Stand.

== Transport ==
From 1923 to 1979, Oberon was served by a branch railway line noted for its very steep 4% gradients and very sharp 100 m radius curves. Following closure, that line was allowed to fall into disrepair, but has been under restoration by the volunteer organisation Oberon Tarana Heritage Railway since 2005.

=== Road access ===
- From Bathurst it is around 49 km (30 mi) southeast, along the sealed O'Connell Road.
- From Great Western Highway near Hartley it is around 50 km (31 mi) south-west, along the sealed Jenolan Caves and Duckmaloi Roads.
- From Goulburn it is around 140 km (87 mi) north, along the sealed Goulburn-Oberon Road.
- Relief maps of the area are provided by NSW Central Ranges Weather.

=== Bus connection ===
There is a Monday to Friday morning bus service (except public holidays) to Tarana station where it connects with the Bathurst Bullet train to Sydney with an afternoon return connection. This provides a poor substitute for the previous Tuesday, Friday, and Sunday NSW TrainLink coach service to Mount Victoria, including holidays.

Weekday bus services to Bathurst are operated by Newmans, which connect with several other NSW TrainLink rail and coach services, and with Lithgow Buslines local buses. A Lithgow Buslines bus runs to Lithgow and back on school days.

== Climate ==
Oberon has an oceanic climate (Cfb); with mild to warm summers, cool to cold winters averaging 0° to 9 °C and evenly-spread precipitation throughout the year. Frosts occur regularly in autumn, winter and spring, and can also occur at the height of summer. Because of its elevation and windward position on the dividing range, moderate to occasionally heavy snowfalls can be expected each year.

Climate data for Oberon (Albion St, 1946–2020, rainfall to 1888); 1,088 m AMSL; 33.70° S, 149.87° E
Month	Jan	Feb	Mar	Apr	May	Jun	Jul	Aug	Sep	Oct	Nov	Dec	Year
Record high °C (°F)	36.9 (98.4)	38.6 (101.5)	32.6 (90.7)	28.1 (82.6)	23.1 (73.6)	17.1 (62.8)	16.8 (62.2)	20.2 (68.4)	25.6 (78.1)	30.1 (86.2)	35.3 (95.5)	37.9 (100.2)	38.6 (101.5)
Mean daily maximum °C (°F)	25.1 (77.2)	23.9 (75.0)	21.5 (70.7)	17.3 (63.1)	13.2 (55.8)	9.5 (49.1)	8.8 (47.8)	10.4 (50.7)	13.8 (56.8)	17.2 (63.0)	20.1 (68.2)	23.3 (73.9)	17.0 (62.6)
Mean daily minimum °C (°F)	11.1 (52.0)	11.2 (52.2)	9.1 (48.4)	5.5 (41.9)	2.6 (36.7)	0.9 (33.6)	−0.3 (31.5)	0.4 (32.7)	2.3 (36.1)	4.8 (40.6)	6.8 (44.2)	9.1 (48.4)	5.3 (41.5)
Record low °C (°F)	−0.5 (31.1)	1.7 (35.1)	−2.2 (28.0)	−4.0 (24.8)	−6.3 (20.7)	−8.5 (16.7)	−8.7 (16.3)	−7.2 (19.0)	−5.8 (21.6)	−3.5 (25.7)	−2.5 (27.5)	−3.0 (26.6)	−8.7 (16.3)
Average precipitation mm (inches)	80.1 (3.15)	60.9 (2.40)	65.7 (2.59)	57.3 (2.26)	59.7 (2.35)	78.5 (3.09)	70.6 (2.78)	74.5 (2.93)	67.2 (2.65)	77.8 (3.06)	71.5 (2.81)	74.6 (2.94)	838.4 (33.01)
Average precipitation days (≥ 0.2 mm)	7.9	7.5	7.9	7.8	9.0	11.7	11.1	10.8	9.6	9.5	8.1	7.7	108.6

== See also ==
- Oberon Correctional Centre
- Mount Trickett
- Mount Bindo
- Shooters Hill
