= Goulburn-Oberon Road =

Road in New South Wales, Australia

Goulburn-Oberon Road Taralga Road, Abercrombie Road New South Wales
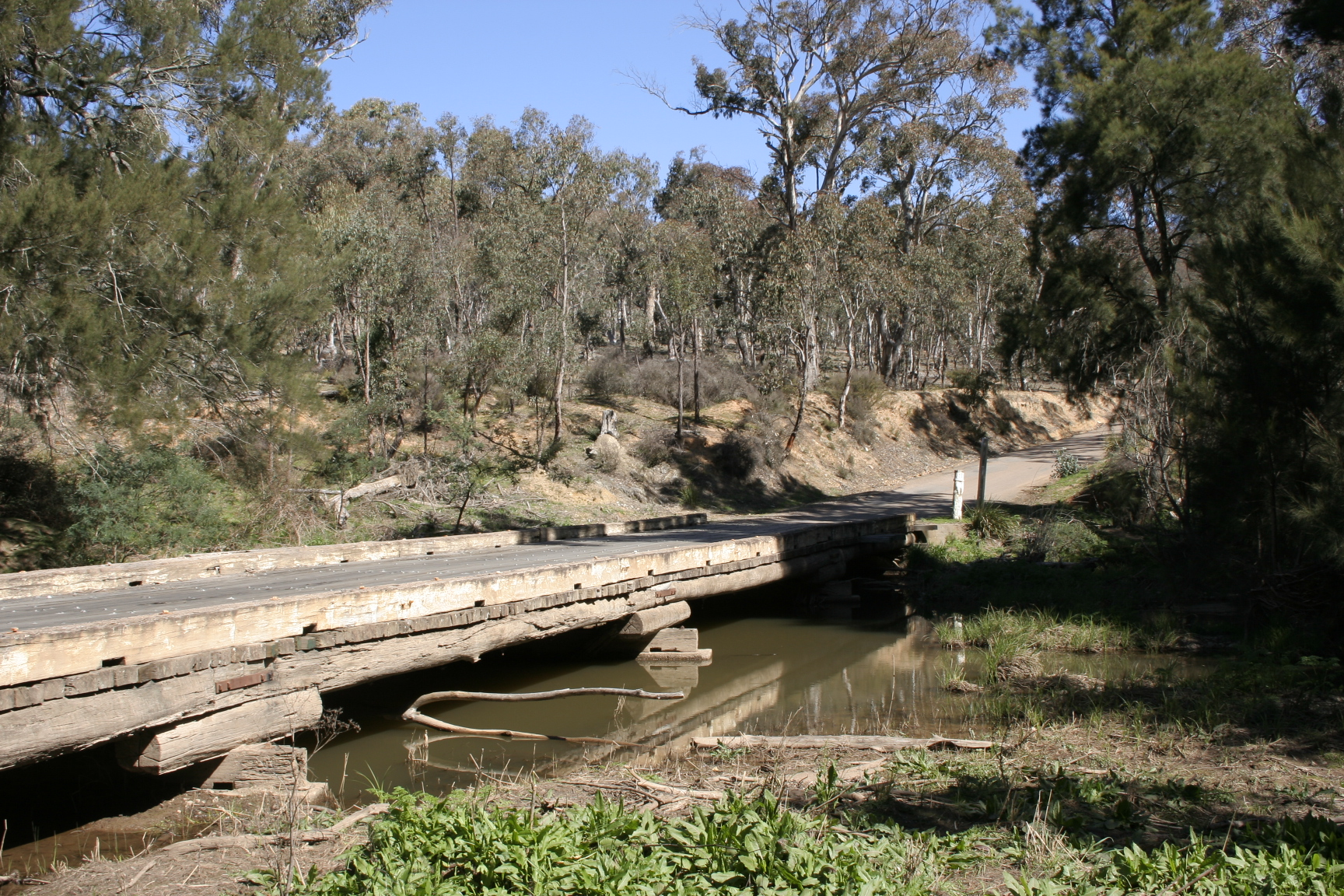
- Goulburn-Oberon Road bridge over Abercrombie River (photographed prior to 2008).
- Coordinates: 33.698514°S 149.845137°E (North end); 34.745601°S 149.733435°E (South end)

General information
- Type: Rural road
- Length: 145 km (90 mi)
- Gazetted: August 1928
- Tourist routes: Tourist Route 13 (Goulburn–Richlands)

Major junctions
- North end: Albion Street; Oberon, New South Wales
- O'Connell Road; Wombeyan Caves Road
- South end: Hume Highway; Goulburn, New South Wales

Location(s)
- Major settlements: Black Springs, Richlands, Taralga, Myrtleville, Chatsbury, Tarlo

Goulburn-Oberon Road is a New South Wales country road linking Goulburn near Hume Highway to Oberon. This name is not widely known to most drivers, as the entire allocation is still best known as by the names of its constituent parts: Taralga Road and Abercrombie Road.

== Route ==
At its northern end, the road passes through imposing plantations of radiata pine trees that supply the timber complex of Oberon.

It is now fully sealed, having undergone extensive work between 2002 and 2008. The final section of around 5 kilometres (3.1 mi) long, located between the Abercrombie River and the end of Wombeyan Caves Road was sealed in February 2008. In 2007, the Upper Lachlan Shire received a grant of $710,000 over 3 years from the New South Wales Government to cover one third of the cost of realigning and sealing that remaining section and will allocate $1,420,000 of council funds over those three years to complete the work. With the support of Oberon Council, the work was completed in the first year.

Wombeyan Caves Road, leading through the Wombeyan Caves reserve and on to Mittagong, starts at the locality of Richlands, around halfway between Goulburn and Oberon. Laggan-Taralga Road from Crookwell ends in the historic town of Taralga a little further south. Bannaby Road to the locality of Bannaby also starts in Taralga.

The road is allocated Tourist Route 13, from Goulburn to Richlands, and continues east along Wombeyan Caves Road.

== History ==
The passing of the Main Roads Act of 1924 through the Parliament of New South Wales provided for the declaration of Main Roads, roads partially funded by the State government through the Main Roads Board (MRB). Main Road No. 256 was declared along this road on 8 August 1928, from the intersection with Great Western Highway at Oberon and Taralga to the intersection with Hume Highway at Goulburn (and continuing northwards to Bathurst); with the passing of the Main Roads (Amendment) Act of 1929 to provide for additional declarations of State Highways and Trunk Roads, this was amended to Main Road 256 on 8 April 1929.

The Department of Main Roads, which had succeeded the MRB in 1932, truncated the northern end of Main Road 256 to Oberon (and extended the western end of Main Road 253 over it instead, from Oberon to Bathurst), on 13 February 1934.

The passing of the Roads Act of 1993 updated road classifications and the way they could be declared within New South Wales. Under this act, Goulburn-Oberon Road today retains its declaration as Main Road 256, from Oberon to Goulburn.

It was, at one stage "seen as a future bypass of Sydney".

== Towns, villages and localities, from south to north ==
- Goulburn
- Tarlo
- Chatsbury
- Myrtleville
- Taralga
- Richlands
- Black Springs
- Oberon

== Major intersections ==
LGA	Location	km	mi	Destinations	Notes
Goulburn Mulwaree	Goulburn	0.0	0.0	Sydney Street (east), to Hume Highway (M31) – Mittagong; Lagoon Street (west) – Goulburn	Southern terminus of road and Tourist Route 13; heads north as Union/Wilmot/Chantry and Tarlo Streets before becoming Taralga Road
Wollondilly River		1.5	0.93	Bridge over river (name not known)	
Tarlo River		17.8	11.1	Bridge over river (name not known)	
Upper Lachlan	Richlands	53.0	32.9	Wombeyan Caves Road (Tourist Route 13) – Wombeyan Caves	Tourist Route 13 continues east along Wombeyan Caves Road
Upper Lachlan	Bummaroo Ford	72.5	45.0	Bummaroo Camping Access Road – Bummaroo Ford	Name change: Abercrombie Road (north), Taralga Road (south)
Abercrombie River		72.5	45.0	Bridge over river (name not known)	
Oberon	Oberon	145	90	O'Connell Road – Bathurst, Oberon	
Oberon	Oberon	145	90	Albion Street – Oberon, Jenolan Caves	Northern terminus of road; northern end of Abercrombie Road
1.000 mi = 1.609 km; 1.000 km = 0.621 mi: Route transition

== See also ==
- Highways in Australia
- List of highways in New South Wales
