= Bolong River =

River in New South Wales, Australia

Coordinates: 34°08′S 149°37′E

Location
- Country: Australia
- State: New South Wales
- IBRA: South Eastern Highlands
- District: Central West
- Municipality: Upper Lachlan

Physical characteristics
- Source: Loadstone Hill
  - location: between Crookwell and Taralga
  - elevation: 905 m (2,969 ft)
- Mouth: Abercrombie River
  - location: in Abercrombie River National Park
  - elevation: 569 m (1,867 ft)
- Length: 59.9 km (37.2 mi)

Basin features
- River system: Murray–Darling basin

Bolong River, a watercourse that is part of the Lachlan catchment within the Murray–Darling basin, is located in the central–western region of New South Wales, Australia.

The river rises on the northern slopes of Loadstone Hill, west of Taralga and east of Crookwell and flows generally north–west, before reaching its confluence with the Abercrombie River within Abercrombie River National Park; dropping 336 metres (1,102 ft) over its course of 60 kilometres (37 mi).

== See also ==
- Rivers of New South Wales
- List of rivers of Australia
