= Curraweela =

- Town
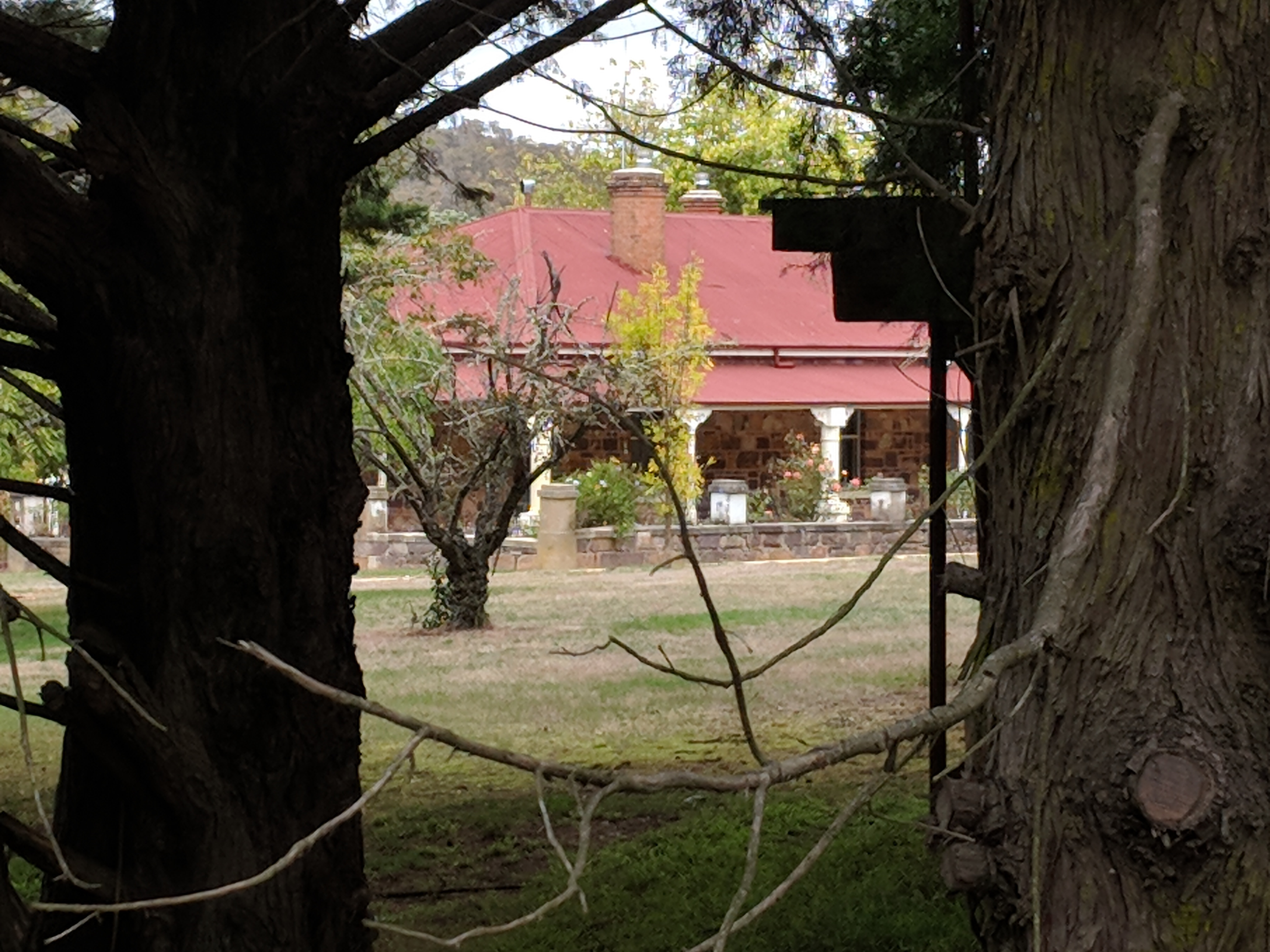

- Coordinates: 34°16′57″S 149°47′02″E
- Country: Australia
- State: New South Wales
- Region: Southern Tablelands
- LGA: Upper Lachlan Shire
- Location: 20 km (12 mi) N of Taralga; 80 km (50 mi) S of Oberon; 155 km (96 mi) NE of Canberra; 61 km (38 mi) N of Goulburn; 253 km (157 mi) W of Sydney

Government
  - State electorate: Goulburn
  - Federal division: Riverina
- Elevation: 888 m (2,913 ft)

Population
  - Total: 67 (SAL 2021)
- Postcode: 2580
- County: Georgiana
- Parish: Yalbraith
Localities around Curraweela
Golspie	Porters Retreat
Yalbraith	Curraweela	Wiarborough
Yalbraith	Richlands	Wombeyan Caves

Curraweela is a locality in the Upper Lachlan Shire, New South Wales, Australia. It lies about 20 km (12 mi) north of Taralga and about 80 km (50 mi) south Oberon on the road from Goulburn to Oberon and Bathurst. At the 2016 census, it had a population of 47. It had a school from 1878 to 1900, which was variously designated as a "half-time", "provisional" and "house to house" school.
