= Strathaird, New South Wales =

Strathaird
- Town
- Coordinates: 34°28′S 149°58′E
- Country: Australia
- State: New South Wales
- LGA: Upper Lachlan Shire

Government
  - State electorate: Goulburn
  - Federal division: Hume

Population
  - Total: 210 (2011 census)
- Postcode: 2580

Strathaird is a locality in the Southern Tablelands of New South Wales, Australia in Upper Lachlan Shire. It is located 6.8km to the south of the township of Taralga, on the Goulburn road.

The suburb is roughly equivalent to the cadastral parish of Strathaird in the County of Argyle.

The village was a stop on the Taralga railway line and the station remains today.

== History ==
The area around Strathaird was the traditional land of the Burra Burra people, a clan group of the Gandangara Nation. The Burra Burra were a warlike tribe who often clashed with neighbouring tribes. Their last great gathering, or corroboree, seems to have been in the 1830s, after which they are not recorded by European history. Accordingly, they would have been pushed further west to less fertile plains due to the impact of Europeans.

Charles Throsby passed through the area in 1819 journeying from Cowpastures to Bathurst in search of new grazing lands. By 1824, John Macarthur's son James and his nephew Hannibal had established themselves in the Taralga region where they helped pioneer Australia's wool industry. A private village was established on land donated by James Macarthur and cleared by convicts to house and service members of the Macarthur family and their employees. Orchard Street, now the main thoroughfare, is located on the site of Macarthur's orchard.

The Taralga railway line through Strathaird was opened in 1926 and closed in 1957.

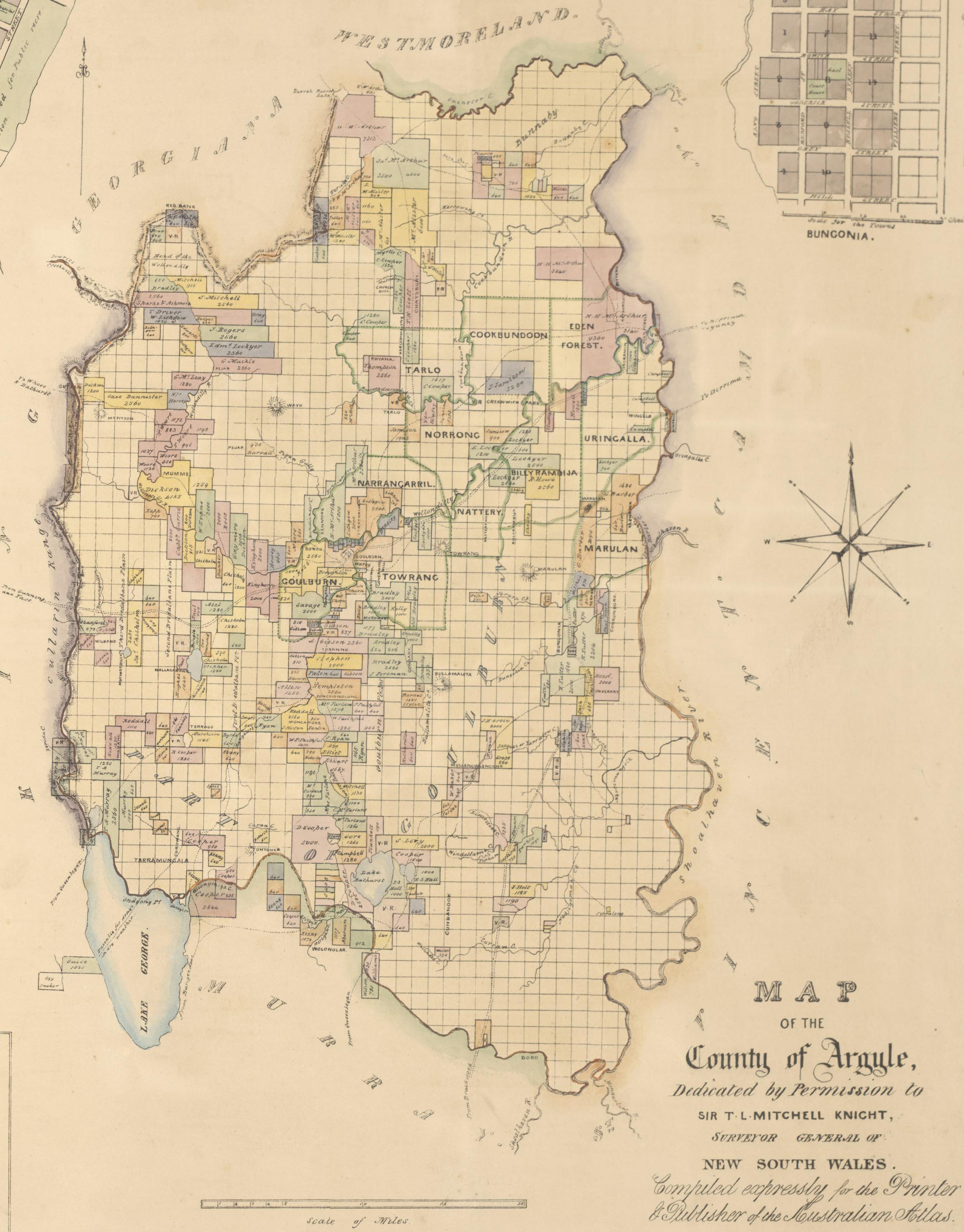
1840s map of the County of Argyle

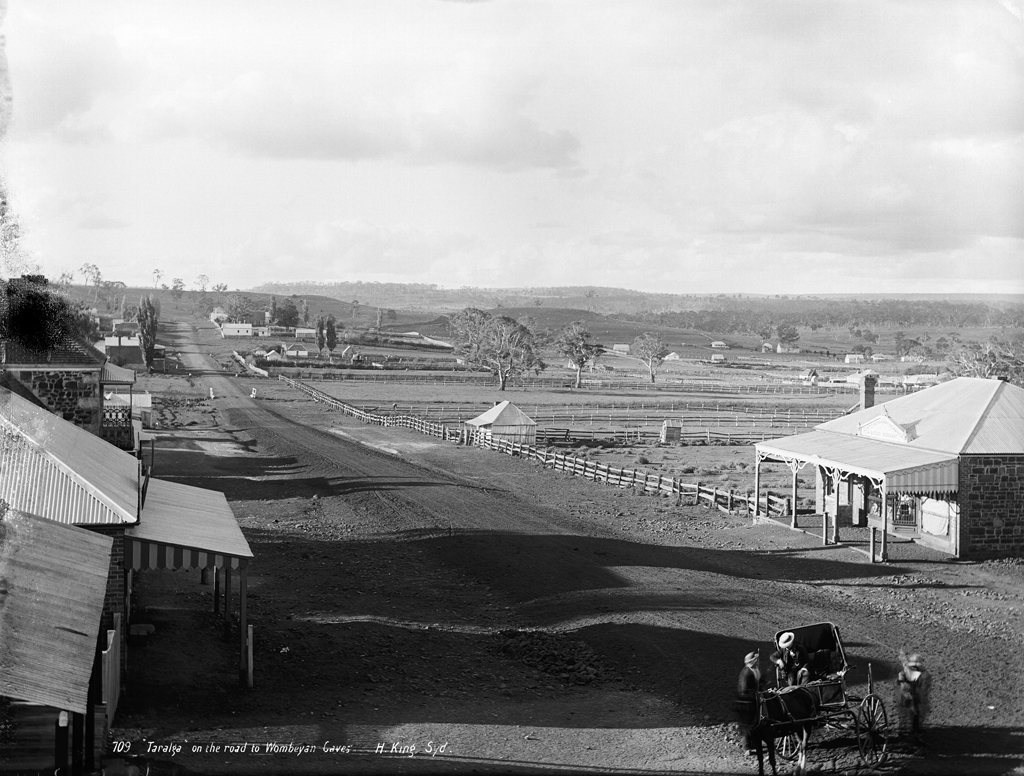
Taralga c1900

== See also ==
- Taralga
- Goulburn
- Bannaby, New South Wales
