= Wombeyan Caves Road =

Road in Australia

Wombeyan Caves Road New South Wales
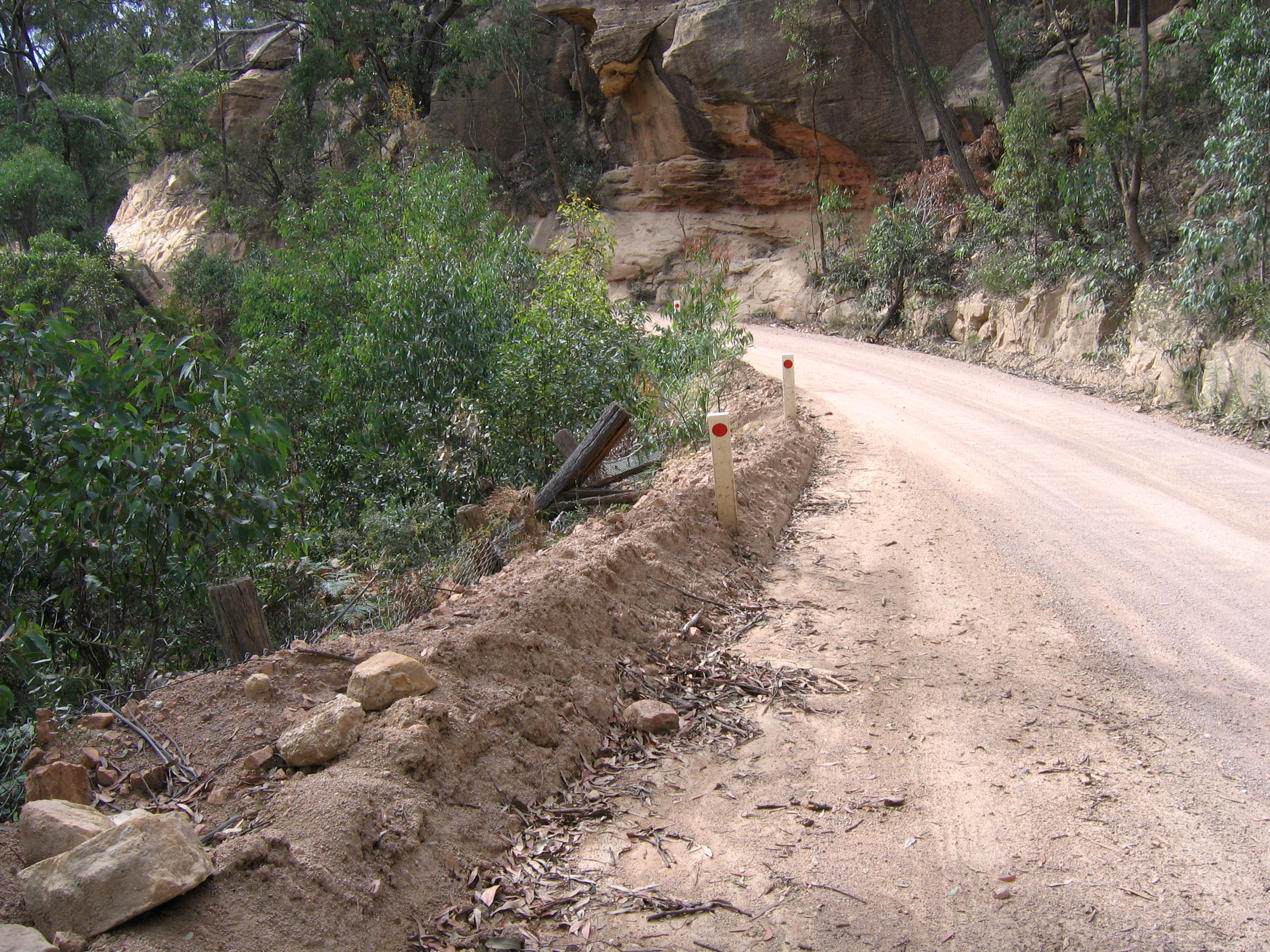
- A typical unsealed section of Wombeyan Caves Road, showing sandstone outcrops and lack of guardrails
- Coordinates: 34.435645°S 150.404634°E (East end); 34.320052°S 149.811110°E (West end)

General information
- Type: Rural road
- Length: 84 km (52 mi)
- Gazetted: August 1928
- Tourist routes: Tourist Route 13 (Richlands–Wombeyan Caves)

Major junctions
- East end: Old Hume Highway; Woodlands, New South Wales
- West end: Taralga Road; Richlands, New South Wales

Location(s)
- Major settlements: High Range, Bullio, Wombeyan Caves

Wombeyan Caves Road is a New South Wales country road linking Mittagong near Hume Highway in the east to Goulburn-Oberon Road at the locality of Richlands in the west.

== Route ==
At its eastern end, the road starts at Old Hume Highway just west of Mittagong. Access from the north of Mittagong is via Mittagong, while access from the south is via the half interchange at the southern end of the Mittagong Bypass section of Hume Highway. It passes through farmland and the locality of High Range as a sealed road. Further west, it changes to unsealed and continues through farmland before entering the Wombeyan Caves area. The road conditions deteriorate substantially as the road goes further west until it reaches the main Wombeyan Caves reserve camping area. West of the camping area, the road is sealed as it climbs a tight, winding section up the mountain side. At the top of that hill, the road reverts to unsealed but is wider and straighter. Close to its western end, the road is a reasonable standard sealed road. This road has no major intersections.

Wombeyan Caves Road goes through the following settlements, from east to west: Mittagong, High Range, Wombeyan Caves and Richlands.

== History ==
The road passes through a historical single lane tunnel carved through the sandstone ridge in a forest area part way through the farmland section. The tunnel is around 22 m long at ground level, but has a sandstone outcrop extending several metres further at its western end. In August 1899 the local newspaper, Goulburn Evening Penny Post, described the progress of "work of tunnelling through the sandstone ridge at the gullies near Bullio is being rapidly pushed on by a gang of experienced men, who are using ratchet drills and other improved appliances, so that this portion of the work will be completed in about six weeks". In late January 1900 the new road was opened, J. H. Young (ex-Minister of Works) proposed that "[it] should be named the Duprez-road in honor of a worthy citizen-who had worked hard to secure it-Mr. A. P. Duprez, of Bowral".

A plaque at the eastern end of the tunnel states:

"This tunnel was completed during 1899 as part of a new tourist road linking the southern highlands to Wombeyan Caves. Officially opened on 29 January 1900, the road was originally named Duprez Road in honour of Adolphe Prosper Duprez of Bowral who was the driving force behind its construction."

The passing of the Main Roads Act of 1924 through the Parliament of New South Wales provided for the declaration of Main Roads, roads partially funded by the State government through the Main Roads Board. Main Road No. 258 was declared along this road on 8 August 1928, from the intersection with Hume Highway (today Old Hume Highway) near Woodlands via Wombeyan Caves to Oberon-Taralga Road (today Taralga Road) to Richlands.

The declaration of Main Road No. 258 was extended eastward along Old Hume Highway to the intersection with Bowral Road in Mittagong, on 2 October 1992., following the completion of the Hume Highway bypass of Mittagong.

The passing of the Roads Act of 1993 updated road classifications and the way they could be declared within New South Wales. Under this act, Wombeyan Caves Road today retains its declaration as part of Main Road 258.

The road was allocated Tourist Route 13, from its western end at Richlands to the turn-off to Wombeyan Caves during the 1990s and 2000s. The Tourist Drive is no longer signed due to issues with road conditions along Wombeyan Caves Road (see below).

== Road conditions ==
Due to the extremely poor condition of the road for several kilometres east of the Wombeyan Caves camping area, it is strongly recommended to access the caves reserve from Goulburn-Oberon Road. Regardless of the impression that might be given by road maps, the road should not be considered to be a through road unless you are in a 4WD or have a lot of time. Hume Highway and Goulburn-Oberon Road via Goulburn are a better option if you are not aiming to get to somewhere between the Wombeyan Caves camping area and the sandstone tunnel west of High Range. However, if one takes their time, a normal family car can do the trip but care must be taken on bends.

Please check on the status of the road before driving it as the portion down to and up from the Wollondilly River can often become extremely rutted and washed out, blocked by large fallen boulders or eroded so badly it becomes unpassable and is closed. On 30 January 2015 the local council had closed the road to all traffic between Goodmans Ford (where the road crosses the Wollondilly River) and Langs Road due to significant parts of the road having been washed away down the cliff.

As of 13 November 2015, Wombeyan Caves Road has reopened after months of repairs to the damaged section of road approximately 11 km west of the Goodman's Ford crossing. However motorists should still exercise caution as the road is largely unsealed and some sections are still very rough.

== Major intersections ==
LGA	Location	km	mi	Destinations	Notes
Wingecarribee	Woodlands	0.0	0.0	Old Hume Highway - Mittagong, Bowral	Eastern terminus of road
Wingecarribee	High Range	7.4	4.6	Greenhills Road – Berrima	
Wollondilly River		45.4	28.2	Goodman's Ford Bridge	
Upper Lachlan	Wombeyan Caves	61.7	38.3	Victoria Arch Drive – Wombeyan Caves	Entrance to Wombeyan Karst Conservation Reserve; Eastern terminus of Tourist Drive 13
Upper Lachlan	Richlands	84.0	52.2	Taralga Road (Tourist Route 13 south, unallocated north) – Goulburn, Taralga, Oberon	Western terminus of road Tourist Route 13 continues south along Taralga Road
1.000 mi = 1.609 km; 1.000 km = 0.621 mi: Route transition

== Gallery ==
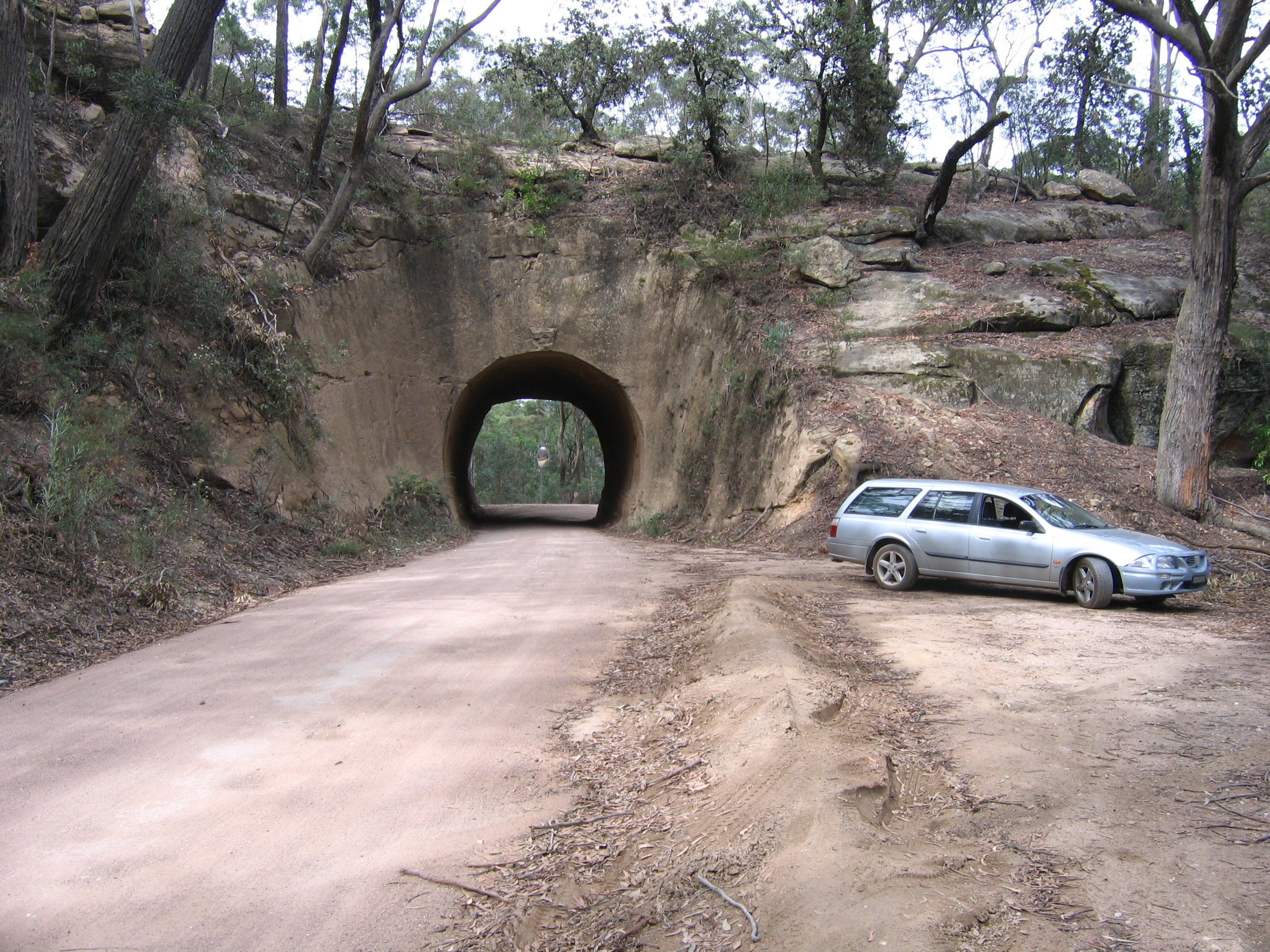
Sandstone tunnel on Wombeyan Caves Road, viewed from eastern side 34°21′S 150°13′E

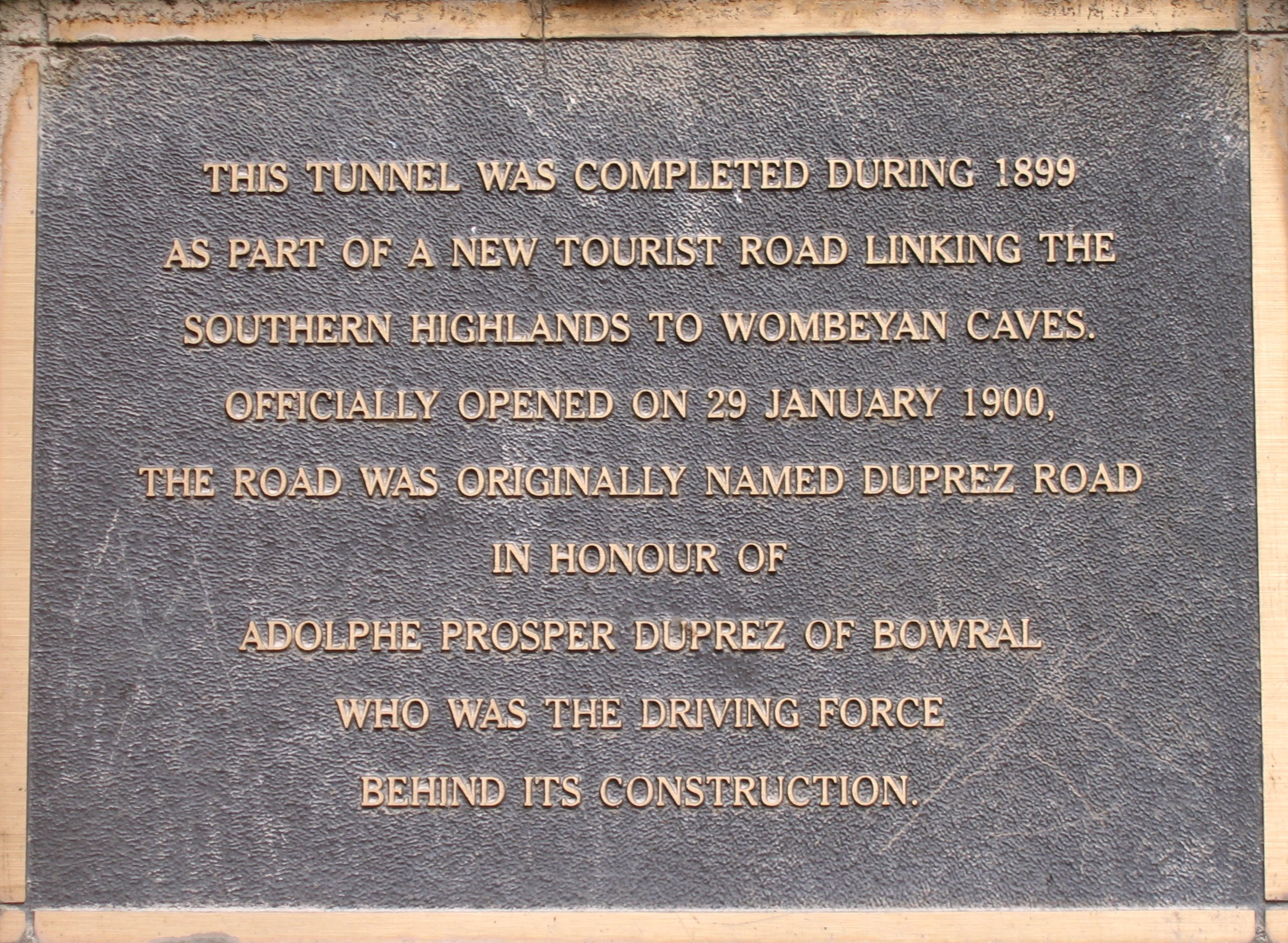
Plaque at end of tunnel on Wombeyan Caves Road

== See also ==
- Highways in Australia
- List of highways in New South Wales
