= The Grange and Macquarie Plains Cemetery =

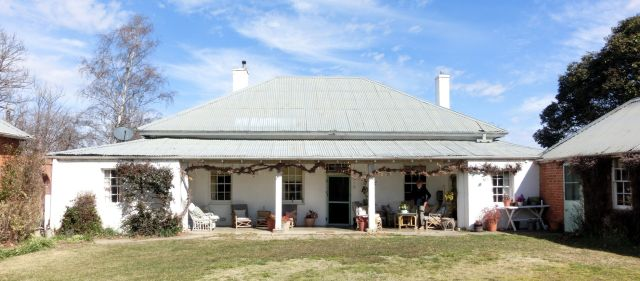
- North facade of Grange farmhouse facing courtyard with cottage on left (east) and kitchen wing on right (west)

- Location within New South Wales Location within Australia
- 33.4962°S 149.6794°E
- Location: 3249 O'Connell Road, Bathurst, Bathurst Region, New South Wales, Australia

History
- Built: 1830–1836

Site notes
- Architect: Vernacular

New South Wales Heritage Register
- Official name: The Grange and Macquarie Plains Cemetery; Macquarie Plains Cemetery
- Type: state heritage (complex / group)
- Designated: 15 March 2013
- Reference no.: 1904
- Type: Homestead Complex
- Category: Farming and Grazing
- Builders: Vernacular – probably convict labour

The Grange and Macquarie Plains Cemetery are a heritage-listed homestead and cemetery at 3249 O'Connell Road, Bathurst, Bathurst Region, New South Wales, Australia. It was built from 1830 to 1836, probably by convict labour. It was added to the New South Wales State Heritage Register on 15 March 2013.

== History ==
=== Aboriginal land ===
Aboriginal occupation of the Blue Mountains area dates back at least 12,000 years and appears to have intensified some 3000–4000 years ago. In pre-colonial times the area now known as Bathurst was inhabited by Aboriginal people of the Wiradjuri group. The clan associated with Bathurst occupied on a seasonal basis most of the Macquarie River area. They moved regularly in small groups but preferred the open land and used the waterways for a variety of food. There are numerous river flats where debris from recurrent camps accumulated over a long period. Colonisation in this region after the first documented European expedition west of the Blue Mountains in 1813 was tentative because of resistance from Aboriginal people. There was some contact, witnessed by sporadic hostility and by the quantity of surviving artefacts manufactured by the Aborigines from European glass. By 1840 there was widespread dislocation of Aboriginal culture, aggravated after 1850 by the gold rush to the region.

=== Colonisation ===
European exploration of the Bathurst area is an extension of the exploration of the eastern inland following closely upon the crossing of the Blue Mountains in 1813. Assistant Surveyor George Evans undertook an initial reconnaissance as far as the Bathurst Plains also in 1813. Bathurst then served as the commencement point for many later official expeditions, as well as for many unofficial reconnaissances by settlers and soldiers.

In 1814–1815, the first road across the Blue Mountains and on to Bathurst was constructed by William Cox and convict labourers. Known as Cox's Road, it reached O'Connell Plains, much of it along the same route as present-day Carlwood Road. Keeping to the south of the Fish River, it passed by the current location of the Grange about a kilometre to its south.

Within a decade or so of its construction, Cox's Road was rivalled as the preferred route from the mountains by other roads, including unofficial deviations which offered either easier or shorter routes. Locally, these changes were mainly to do with crossing the river to the east of Bathurst and approaching the settled area over more easily travelled country. The new routes also reflected new land grants in and around Kelso. A new official route was surveyed in 1823 which crossed the Fish River at O'Connell and, following the line of a similar route to the present day Bathurst-O'Connell Road, entered Bathurst via Kelso, thus requiring a crossing of the Macquarie River at the Bathurst settlement. The current Bathurst-O'Connell Road has bisected the Grange property since 1860.

With the extension of British colonial rule beyond the Blue Mountains in 1815, the system of land tenure established in Sydney was extended into the Bathurst region. This system did not recognise prior Aboriginal ownership of the land but understood all land to be owned by the Crown, to be provided to settlers through land grants. Governor Macquarie, who favoured a limited settlement of the newly discovered country west of the Blue Mountains, strictly controlled the alienation of Crown Land in the Bathurst area during his governorship between 1810 and 1821. Land grants were made during Macquarie's administration to only a handful of pastoralists. This included generous land grants to those associated with the opening of the way to the interior and the building of the roads to Bathurst, notably William Cox and William Lawson. Much smaller land grants were also made in 1818 to ten less prominent settlers, a mix of free and emancipist men, for farms in the Kelso area.

=== The Grange ===
Soon after this in 1821, land grants on adjacent lots were also made by Governor Macquarie to free settler brothers, Thomas and John West. Each was granted 600 acres of land, and John West established The Grange, while Thomas West established Westham to the east. Both West brothers built similar styled Georgian farm houses, and both farmhouses are still extant, although the Grange is possibly more intact than Westham.

In 1822 Governor Brisbane introduced a more expansionary policy of land grants. Free settlers were encouraged to apply for land grants and allowed to nominate specific blocks of land. Brisbane's encouragement of pastoral settlement, with the consequent in-rush of grant holders and their stock, quickly overran huge tracks of Wiradjuri land. In 1824 the Wiradjuri attempted an armed resistance to this threat, led by Windradyne, which was ruthlessly put down by the troops in Bathurst.

The success of some of the early pastoralists led to the building of quite substantial homesteads soon after their arrival. The remaining fabric of these homesteads often display the evolution of the pastoralists' success – with rooms and wings added to the basic, original building and open areas enclosed. A number of these early homesteads such as The Grange and Westham still exist, usually single storey and sometimes Georgian in style but adapted for the colonial climate. Their style, size and substance reflected the growing wealth and status of the owners, men who had been able to gain the best land on the plains. The Grange is a particularly good surviving example of a Georgian homestead, as it is largely unaltered from its original construction. These early homesteads provided accommodation not only for the pastoralist and his family but also for servants and workers, including assigned convicts prior to the 1840s. Outbuildings used today for other purposes may have once provided accommodations for servants and farm workers.

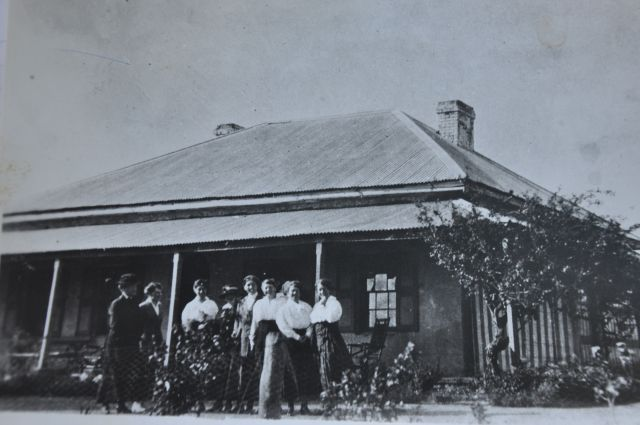
Farmhouse, circa 1900

The original farmhouse was constructed by John West c. 1830 (most likely using convict labour assigned to him) of brick walls, timber shingles roof and surrounding verandah. It is believed to have been named The Grange at this time by John West. A similar shaped farmhouse is built around the same time by his brother Thomas West on his adjoining land grant, named Westham.

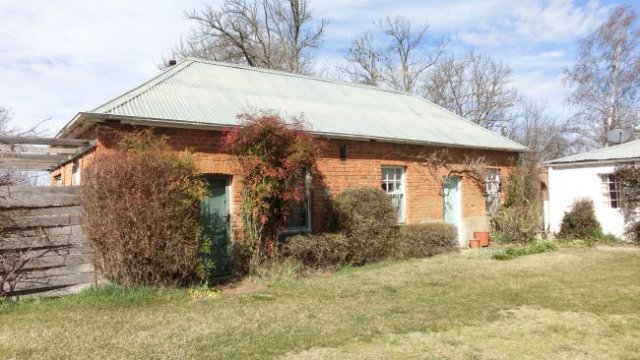
The Cottage, built c. 1836

A brick cottage adjacent to the original The Grange farmhouse was built in 1836.

In 1860 a new road to O'Connell was built, bisecting the property.

In 1920, the original 600-acre land grant was divided into three 250-acre lots. The lot containing The Grange farmhouse was retained by the West family, while the remaining two lots were sold and became known as Illawong and Westbrook (now known as Ashbrook).

The Grange was used for pastoral farming by four generations of the West family until it was sold to Edward Rooke in 1955. In 1965 the Grange was sold to Dr Brooke Moore and Mrs Freeda Moore, and then in 1972 was sold to Mrs Moore's niece and her husband, the current owners in 2012, Edward and Lorraine Jones. The buildings were in poor condition in the 1970s and have been gradually conserved since then by the current owners.

=== Timeline of the Grange residents ===
- 1819 – John West is given permission in England to proceed to the colony as a free settler with his family (NSW State Records (NSWSR) Reel 6021; 4/1094 pp. 93–96). His brother Thomas also given permission to proceed with his wife Elizabeth and six children: Joseph 20, Francis Jane 17, Eliza 14, Ann 12, Sarah 7 and Catherine 4. James was born in 1822 in the colony
- 1821 – John West with his wife Martha and children arrives in Sydney on the Westmorland: Joseph 24, William 22, John 20, James 17, Major 13.
- 1821 – John West, Parramatta listed as free settler to receive 600-acre land grant in Bathurst
- 1825 – John West and family live in town of Bathurst prior to The Grange being built
- 1849 – John West dies, Bathurst
- 1930 – Charles James West (grandson of John West, son of Major West) living at The Grange with his wife and three children
- 1935 – Charles James West dies, Bathurst
- 1936 – Leslie Charles West and Arthur Thompson West (grandsons of John West, sons of Charles James West) living at The Grange with their sister Amy Ellen.
- 1945 – Edward Rooke appointed share farmer on The Grange property.
- 1955 – Arthur Thompson West dies, Bathurst.
- 1955 – Edward Rooke purchases The Grange from estate of Arthur Thompson West.
- 1965 – Mrs Freeda Moore, wife of Dr Brooke Moore, purchases The Grange from Mr Rooke.
- 1972 – Edward and Lorraine Jones (niece of Mrs Freeda Moore) purchase The Grange from estate of Mrs Freeda Moore

=== Macquarie Plains Cemetery ===
Around 1844 John West donated two-thirds of an acre (quarter of a hectare) of land to the Methodist Church to build a small church and cemetery. The cemetery appears to have been first used in 1837 and discontinued in 1896. The first known burial had been Eliza Hall in 1837. It contains at least 22 graves. The timber church was demolished in 1920. The land with cemetery was purchased back from the Uniting Church of Australia in 1997 by Edward and Lorraine Jones.

== Description ==
The Grange is located 12 km southeast of Bathurst within the Macquarie Valley in the Central Tablelands district. The 28 hectares included in this listing is that part of Lot 6 DP 880125 located between O'Connell Road and the Fish River as well as the adjacent quarter hectare lot with cemetery dating from the mid-nineteenth century. Both are a remnant of the original grant of 600 acres (243 hectares) made to John West by Lachlan Macquarie c. 1821.

=== Grounds and gardens ===
The gardens around the homestead do not appear to be original and may not be heritage significant. They have been largely planted by the current owners since purchasing the property in 1972. It is believed the gum tree at the entrance gate to the property on O'Connell Road is more historic and is considered significant. There is also an historic poplar tree located on the western side of the kitchen wing. No heritage survey of the vegetation on the property had been conducted by the time of the SHR listing in 2012.

The remainder of the original grant land surrounding the homestead to be included in the SHR listing has been used traditionally for pasturing sheep and includes vernacular structures such as corrugated iron and timber sheds, fencing and sheep yards. There is a non-significant green house on the east side of the homestead. No heritage survey of these ancillary structures on the property had been conducted by the time of the SHR listing in 2012.

=== Cemetery ===
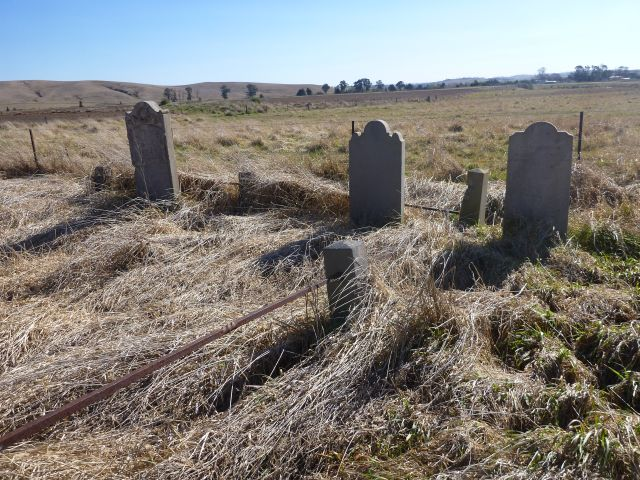
View of the cemetery, facing south from O'Connell Road and looking towards the river

The cemetery is located on a 2/3 acre parcel of land donated by John West to the Methodist Church in 1844 and retains its separate Land Parcel number. It is located 500m to the south of The Grange farmhouse and sits in the north eastern corner of the section of land south of O'Connell Road. It is bordered to the south and east by the Grange, by O'Connell Road to the north, and the neighbouring property to the west. A small wooden Methodist church was apparently demolished c. 1920 and only the ruins of the graveyard remain. The graves are those of local Macquarie Plains families, including some members of the West family, apparently dating from between 1837 and 1896. 22 inscriptions were recorded for the Australian Cemeteries Index in 2006 and are available for viewing online. This website quotes a local community member stating that the cemetery was a children's cemetery during the 1876 scarlet fever epidemic, and that many children are buried here in unmarked graves.

=== Homestead ===
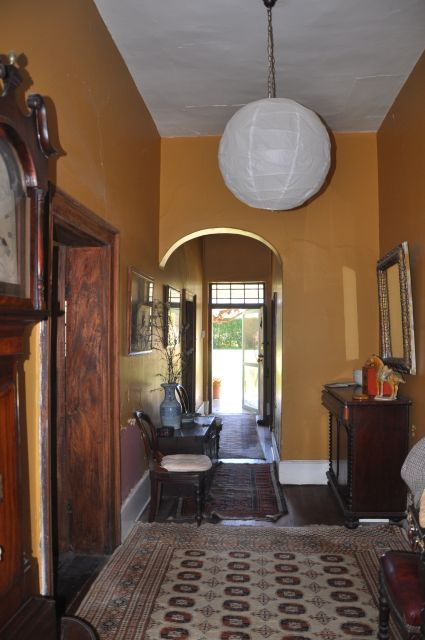
Farmhouse's hallway

The homestead includes a Georgian farmhouse understood to date from c. 1830, a kitchen-garage wing on the north eastern side, probably dating from the same time and a cottage wing on the north western side dating from c. 1836. Both wings are now joined to the original house to form a courtyard entrance area facing O'Connell Road.

The original farmhouse has a verandah which originally surrounded the house entirely and is believed to be one of earliest examples of a wrap-around verandah built in Australia. The verandah has been enclosed on two northern corners to form rooms that now connect the farmhouse to the cottage and the kitchen-garage wing. An "outdoor" room has also been added c. 1980 near the southwest corner of the farmhouse. The verandah has a separated roof with a lower pitch than the main roof, a solution favoured aesthectially from the mid-1830s. The walls of the farmhouse are rendered brickwork. A partition wall within the kitchen wing is constructed of pise. The original windows on the farmhouse are timber-framed, double-hung with six lights per pane, fine glazing bars and mostly original glass. The original entrance (facing south towards the river) has a formal symmetrical facade with a central door and half round fan-light with 8 panels. The original shingles for the roof, manufactured locally, are believed to be still in place beneath the corrugated iron roof. The most intact part of the original farmhouse is its hallway.

John West had several male convicts listed under his household during the period the three sections of the homestead were constructed, so it is believed to be convict built.

The homestead was originally designed with the front entrance facing the original road to the south. The construction of a new road to the north c. 1860 (O'Connell Road) necessitated a changed orientation for the house to the north, utilising what was originally the rear facade and courtyard, which now acts as the entrance to the homestead.

=== Kitchen ===
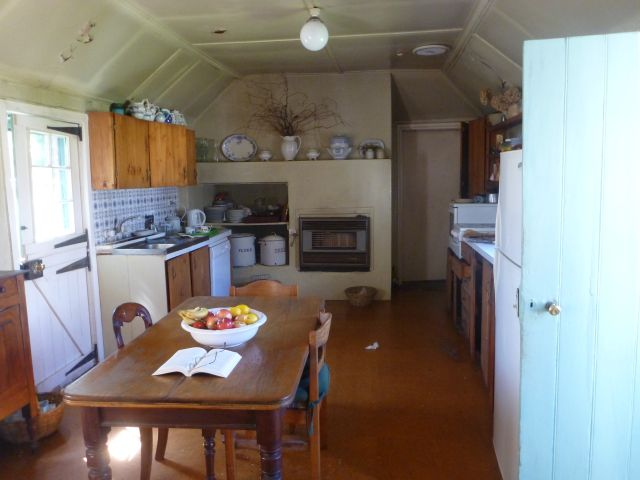
Kitchen

The kitchen, originally built as a separate outhouse and probably dating from the same time as the original farmhouse. The cottage dating from c. 1836 was built using hand-produced bricks.

=== Condition ===
As at 29 August 2012, The Grange farmhouse (c. 1830) remains largely on its original footprint and retains a considerable proportion of its original construction although with extensive minor changes to the configuration of internal rooms, and rooms added to three of the four corners of the wrap around verandah. There is rising damp in bedrooms on the north east side.

The cottage (c. 1836) retains its external walls but has been extended one room's width to the east to incorporate a new kitchen and bathroom. What was previously a tack room (used to house equipment for horses when bought by the current owners in 1972) has been turned into a sitting room but the bedrooms on the south west end of the cottage remain in their original configuration.

The cemetery is in derelict and unrenovated condition. The Australian Cemeteries Index describes it: "Several of the stones have been repaired or re-erected after falling or being knocked over at some stage. Two of the sandstone monuments have been eroded by rising salt near ground level rendering the lower text unreadable but others are in surprisingly good condition for their age." 22 inscriptions transcribed by the index in 2006 and updated in 2012 are available online. Records concerning the cemetery are apparently also available from the National Trust and Bathurst Council.

=== Modifications and dates ===
The Grange has been altered over time by its various occupants. The construction of the new O'Connell Road c. 1860 (which bisected the original land grant property) brought about a change in entry from the southwestern facade, facing the river to the northeastern facade facing O'Connell Road.

In c. 1880 the wall dividing the sitting and dining rooms was demolished to form one larger living room. The fireplace was relocated to the western wall of the room, using the original cedar mantle (Edwards CMP).

The fireplace in the main bedroom is believed to have been added or renovated in 1880 at the same time as the living room fireplace, using the same bricks. The ceiling in this room is thought to have been replaced c. 1920. The ceiling in the second bedroom is also thought to have been replaced at this time.

A bathroom was created in the lobby and part of the verandah, c. 1920s.

The once separate kitchen wing was joined to the main house prior to 1900. A fibro panelled ceiling in the kitchen was installed c. 1920.

In 1965 the wood room was repaired for wood storage. In 1975 a door was attached to the wood room for security.

The timber floor of the kitchen was replaced with cement in 1965.

In 1972 the original sulky shed collapsed (now the garage area consisting of two open garages and a tool room with the kitchen roofline extended for symmetry).

In 1975 access was made to the small outside verandah bedroom.

In 1975 the corners of the rear verandah were enclosed to form a dressing room and bathroom. The kitchen was renovated in 1975, removing the wood fired stove. The doors from the kitchen out to the kitchen garden were replaced in 1975. In 1975 a door was added from the dining room through to the wood room.

In 1980 an outdoor room was added near the south western corner of the house.

The original ceiling in the dining room (small corner room) was replaced in 1985. The original horsehair and plaster ceiling of the small bedroom collapsed and was replaced in 1985.

In 1998 the lobby/bathroom window was replaced with French doors.

The cottage earlier consisted of two bedrooms joined by a doorway with two entries to the courtyard. The cottage was partially rebuilt in 1973 and one doorway to the courtyard removed. The smaller of the two rooms, then a tack room, became a living area with a concrete floor to replace the dirt floor. The larger room had a fireplace and two windows and was partitioned off to form two bedrooms. A new brick extension was added to the western side of the cottage, consisting of a kitchen/dining, a lobby and a bathroom. The bricks used for the new extension were sourced from the demolition of the National Bank in Bathurst.

== Heritage listing ==
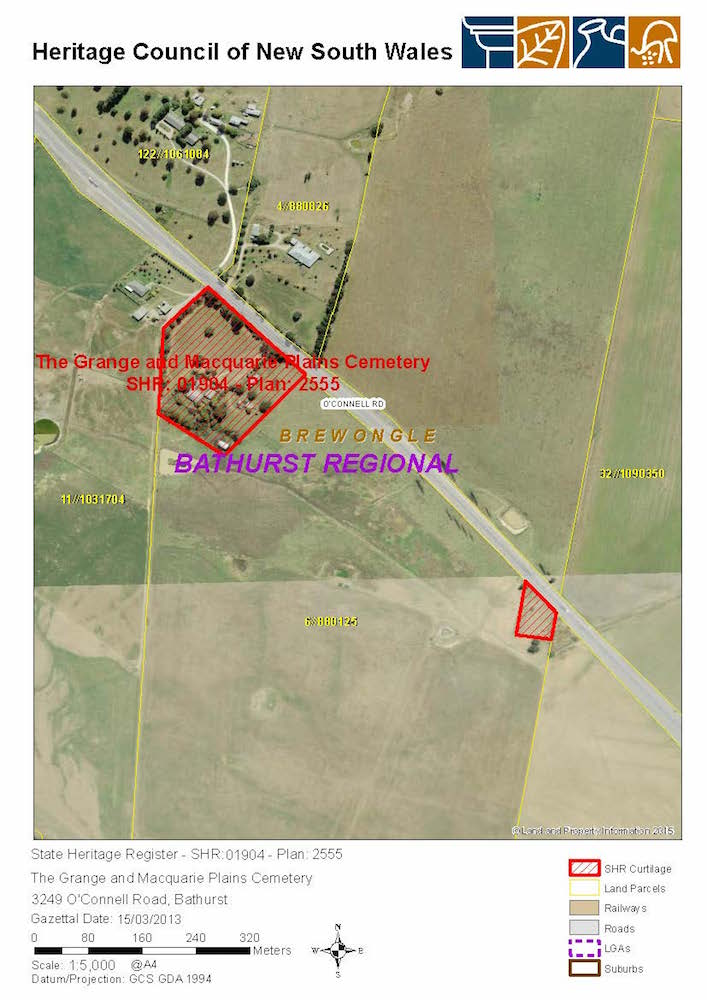
Heritage boundaries

The Grange is of state significance for its history and rarity as one of the earliest surviving colonial farmhouses built in inland Australia. Forming one of the pioneering families of the Bathurst region, John West and his brother Thomas came to the area in 1821 to farm on adjoining lands granted to them by Governor Macquarie. John West's farmhouse dating from 1830 has aesthetic significance for its wrap-around verandah, which has been claimed to be the earliest surviving example of its kind in Australia, and for its well-proportioned and symmetrical Georgian facade. The Grange also has significance for its potential to provide insights into early colonial life and conditions for convicts, some of whom were known to have been assigned to the farm. The historic Methodist cemetery (used c. 1855–1896), on quarter hectare of the original grant, is an important relic from the time of the early settler families in the area, and includes the graves of members of the West family.

The Grange and Macquarie Plains Cemetery was listed on the New South Wales State Heritage Register on 15 March 2013 having satisfied the following criteria.

The place is important in demonstrating the course, or pattern, of cultural or natural history in New South Wales.

The Grange is of state significance as one of the earliest residences to be constructed in inland Australia and an early example of a colonial Georgian house. It was probably built by convict labour around 1830 on land granted to John West in 1821, one of only a few land grants made in the area by Governor Macquarie. John West, a free settler farmer who may have participated in the original surveying of the area, along with his brother Thomas, were early landowners and a founding family of the district. The historic cemetery is a relic from the time of the early days of colonisation in the area, and includes the graves of members of the West family. The Grange is a prominent property in and important historical locale for the development of the region of Bathurst. The listing includes 27 hectares of land from the original 1821 grant.

The place has a strong or special association with a person, or group of persons, of importance of cultural or natural history of New South Wales's history.

The Grange is of local significance for its association with the governorship of Lachlan Macquarie, being one of the few land grants made by Macquarie west of the Blue Mountains. It is also of local significance for its geographical association with the building of the early roads to Bathurst, since it was established within a few years and within a few kilometres of Cox's pioneering road to Bathurst. It is also of local significance for its association with the pioneering West family in Bathurst, being originally owned and built by John West and located adjoining property owned by his brother Thomas West.

The place is important in demonstrating aesthetic characteristics and/or a high degree of creative or technical achievement in New South Wales.

The Grange is of state significance aesthetically as an exemplar of a colonial farmhouse which demonstrates the symmetrical and well-proportioned characteristics of the Georgian architectural style. Its wrap-around verandah, dating from c. 1830, has been described as the first to be built in Australia.

The place has a strong or special association with a particular community or cultural group in New South Wales for social, cultural or spiritual reasons.

The Grange is of local significance to many people in the Bathurst area as an intact demonstration of colonial life in the Bathurst region at the commencement of European settlement in the area.

The place has potential to yield information that will contribute to an understanding of the cultural or natural history of New South Wales.

The Grange is of at least local significance as for its potential to yield archaeological information about the colonial and convict history of NSW and the lives and occupations of the people who worked there.

The place possesses uncommon, rare or endangered aspects of the cultural or natural history of New South Wales.

The Grange is of state significance for its rarity as a fairly intact example of an early Georgian colonial farmhouse. The cemetery at The Grange is of local significance as a rare surviving example of a community burial site for early settlers and their families.

The place is important in demonstrating the principal characteristics of a class of cultural or natural places/environments in New South Wales.

The Grange is of state significance as a representative example of a colonial Georgian homestead probably built by convict labour on an early colonial land grant.
