= Retreat River =

Retreat Little River
- The mouth of the Retreat River in New South Wales

Location
- Country: Australia
- State: New South Wales
- Region: South Eastern Highlands (IBRA), Central West
- LGA: Oberon

Physical characteristics
- Source: Great Dividing Range
  - location: near Shooters Hill
- Mouth: confluence with the Abercrombie River
  - location: near Hadley
  - coordinates: 34°0′14.33″S 149°46′32.49″E

Basin features
- River system: Lachlan catchment, Murray–Darling basin
- National park: Abercrombie River NP

The Retreat River, a perennial stream that is part of the Lachlan catchment within the Murray–Darling basin, is located in the central western region of New South Wales, in eastern Australia.

The Retreat River rises on the western slopes of the Great Dividing Range, near Shooters Hill, and flows generally to the south-west, before reaching its confluence with the Abercrombie River, near Hadley.

The river flows adjacent to the Abercrombie River National Park, with access at The Sink campground.

== See also ==
- List of rivers of Australia
- List of rivers of New South Wales (L–Z)
- Rivers of New South Wales
