= Hillas Farm Homestead =

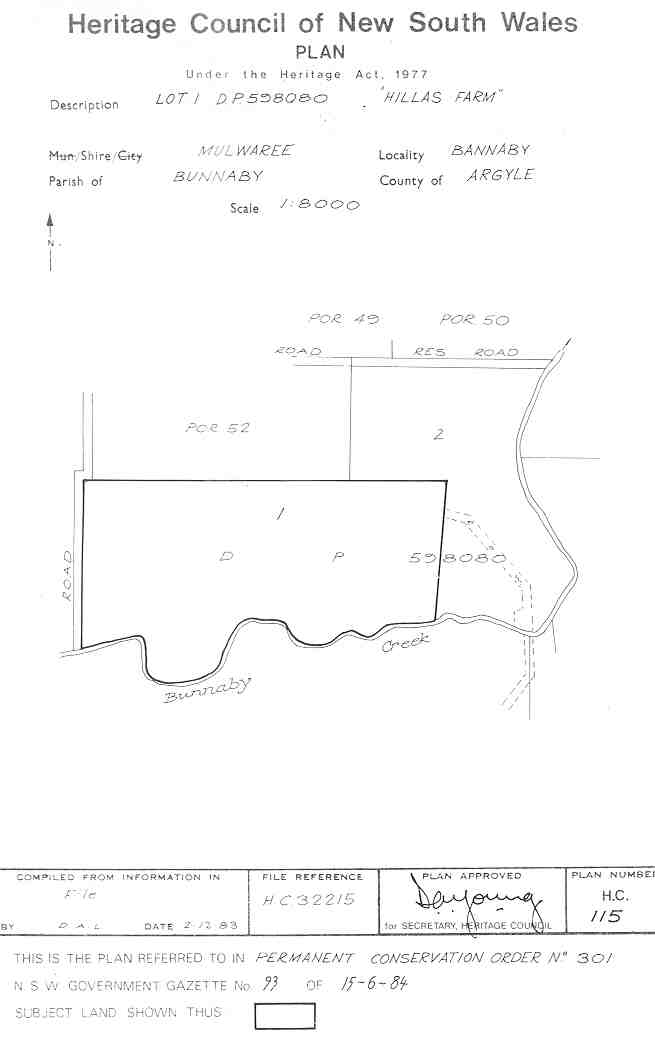
- Heritage boundaries

- Location within New South Wales Location within Australia
- 34.4315°S 149.9899°E
- Location: Bannaby, Upper Lachlan Shire, New South Wales, Australia

New South Wales Heritage Register
- Official name: Hillas Farm Homestead and Outbuildings
- Type: state heritage (landscape)
- Designated: 2 April 1999
- Reference no.: 301
- Type: Homestead Complex
- Category: Farming and Grazing

Hillas Farm Homestead is a heritage-listed homestead complex at Bannaby, in the Southern Tablelands region of New South Wales, Australia. It is also known as Hillasmount. It was added to the New South Wales State Heritage Register on 2 April 1999.

== History ==
Hillas Farm Homestead was built c. 1876 by Martha and Matthew Hillas. The property had existed since 1826.

It remained in the Hillas family until 1953, when Evelyn Hillas bequeathed it to a family friend upon her death at age 93.

A Permanent Conservation Order was issued for the property in June 1984.

== Description ==
The homestead is a four-bedroom home built from lathe and plaster, with various outbuildings.

== Heritage listing ==
Hillas Farm Homestead was listed on the New South Wales State Heritage Register on 2 April 1999.
