= Catholic Church of Christ the King =

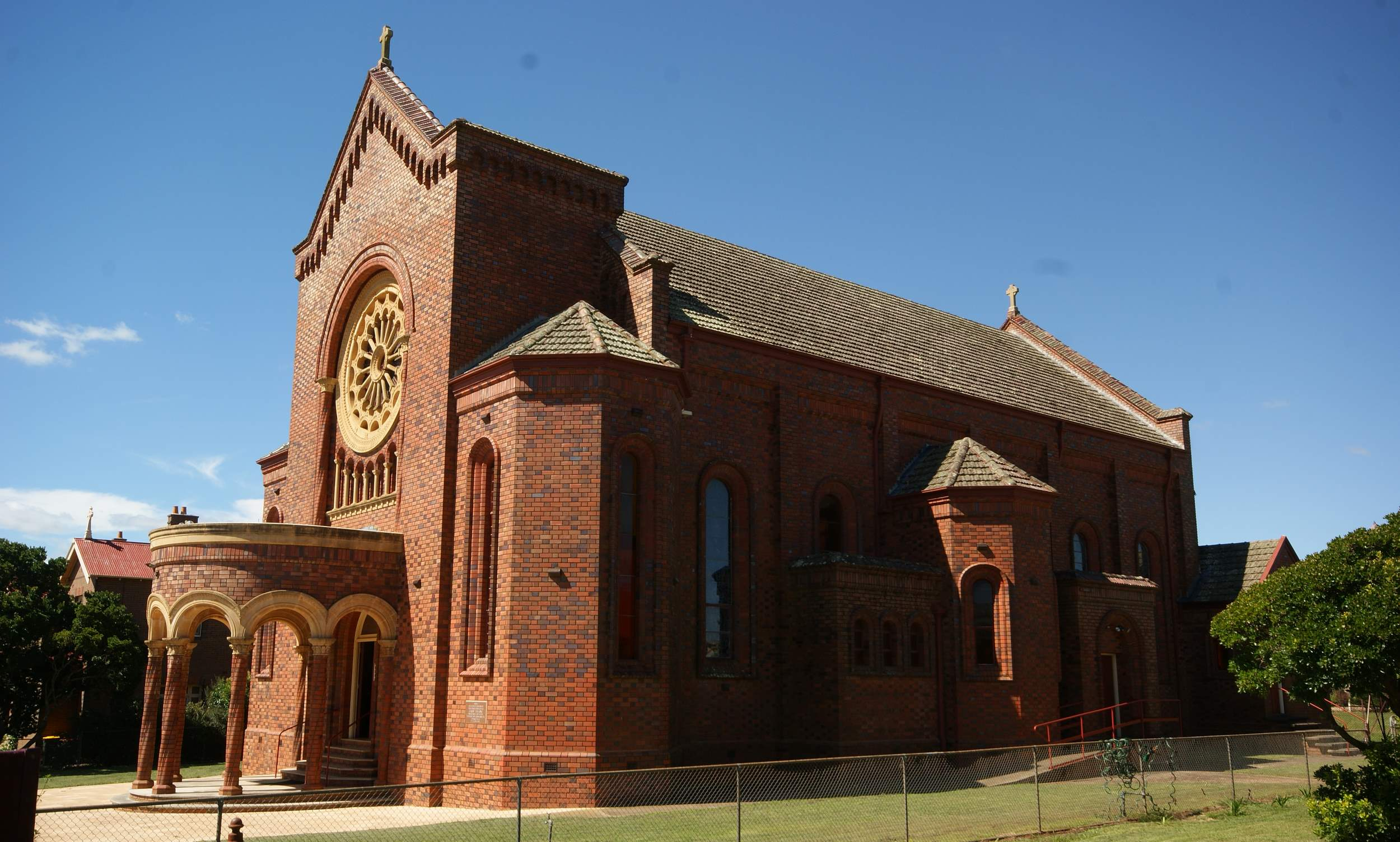
- Church of Christ the King, in 2011

- Location in New South Wales
- 34°24′19″S 149°49′17″E
- Location: Macarthur Street, Taralga, Upper Lachlan Shire, New South Wales
- Country: Australia
- Denomination: Catholic

History
- Status: Church
- Founded: 1934

Architecture
- Functional status: Active
- Heritage designation: New South Wales State Heritage Register
- Designated: 30 April 2004
- Architect(s): Sydney Smith of Ogg & Serpell
- Architectural type: Inter-War period

Specifications
- Length: 31 metres (102 ft)
- Width: 12 metres (39 ft)

Administration
- Diocese: Archdiocese of Canberra – Goulburn

New South Wales Heritage Register
- Official name: Catholic Church of Christ the King; Church of Christ the King
- Type: State heritage (built)
- Designated: 30 April 2004
- Reference no.: 1696
- Type: Church
- Category: Religion
- Builders: R. M. Bowcock

Catholic Church of Christ the King is a heritage-listed Catholic church building located at Macarthur Street, Taralga, Upper Lachlan Shire, New South Wales, Australia. It was designed by Sydney Smith of Ogg & Serpell and built from in 1934 by R. M. Bowcock. It is also known as Church of Christ the King. The property is owned by the Archdiocese of Canberra – Goulburn and was added to the New South Wales State Heritage Register on 30 April 2004.

== History ==
The Church of Christ the King was designed by Sydney Smith of Ogg & Serpell, 349 Collins Street, Melbourne on 17 January 1933.

The architectural drawings were completed by Clement Glancey, Bligh Street, Sydney.

The church was constructed by R. M. Bowcock, Ashfield Sydney in 1934. The church was completed and furnished in six months.

== Description ==
The Church of Christ the King is a red brick Inter-War-Romanesque structure approximately 31 metres (102 ft) long and by 12 metres (39 ft) wide. The nave consists of six bays with a large sanctuary at the east and an entry narthex and choir loft at the west of the church. As a result, the church has a strictly correct liturgically geographical alignment and the sun rises directly through the sanctuary windows and sets directly through the Great West Window. The church is the most prominent building in Taralga and can be observed throughout the towns and its environs.

Exterior

The Romanesque style of the building is established by the asymmetrical massing and use of red brick to create homogeneous heavily textured exterior walls. There are 31 round-headed arched window openings. The western end gable is finished with a raking arches motif.

Above the western portico is an impressive sandstone circular or wheel window with sixteen outer surrounding semi-circles, sixteen spoked segments and a circular hub. The architectural elements around the wheel window, the spiral pillars, the semi-circular arches, the sandstone carved oak leaf motifs, are reiterated harmoniously in the front porch beneath the window.

Interior

The interior of the church contains extensive and sometime elaborate plaster work. Each bay has a corded plaster decoration around the full curve of the barrel vaulted ceiling, while Corinthian style capitals are prominent on the pillars and pilasters.

Above the sanctuary, there is an impressive life-size Calvary, depicting the Scene "Woman, behold thy son; son behold thy mother", with the Blessed Virgin and the young and beardless Saint John flanking the Crucified. The sanctuary is generously decked with beautiful cream marble in the altar, elaborate reredo and pulpit - all generously decked with very fine brasswork in massive candlesticks, crucifix, sanctuary lamp, lecterns and votive candle stands. The free- standing Post-Vatican II altar was introduced without structural alteration of the sanctuary and tastefully matches the original high altar.

The altar is flanked with magnificent dioramas of the period depicting Our Lord's apparition revealing the Sacred Heart to St Margaret Mary, and Our Lady's apparition revealing the Immaculate Conception to St Bernadette. Side altars are dedicated to Our Lady of Lourdes and St Joseph. There are shrines of St Therese of Lisieux and St Francis Xavier, the two patrons of Australia as a then "mission country". Original votive lamps are in place. The original altar rails are preserved in situ.

Windows

The church windows consist of six stained glass, seven leadlight and approximately twenty mid-amber yellow double-rolled cathedral glass windows. The leadlight windows were commissioned and installed before the emergence of "modern" tastes, the first four by Percy Barnard of Standard Glass Company, Sydney and the last two by Mark B Hill and D terry. This set of six windows all share a very strong common background, colours and style. They capture very well the hagiography of the period and in details locate the work in the religious culture of the period and the place. For example, St Patrick's crozier is planted in Ireland, while the nearby Christ the King window has our Lord standing upon Australia. The Solemnity of Christ the King was but newly proclaimed when the church as erected, St Therese of Lisieux not long canonised and her doctrine flourishing (as but recently manifest in her elevation to the title of Doctor of the Church), St Maria Goretti recently canonised and capturing the period of plentiful vocations to sacred virginity, and Pope Pius X but recently canonised and his doctrine of frequent reception of the Holy Eucharist suffusing the interior of the church and its present and unbroken heritage of Catholic spirituality. The glass communicates a great sense of congruence with the entire structure and gives it much brilliance and light.

The church contains a collection of significant moveable objects that are included in the State Heritage Register listing. A complete list is held with the NSW Heritage Office.

=== Condition ===
As at 26 June 2003, physical condition is excellent.

The integrity of the structure is uncompromised.

== Heritage listing ==
As at 1 June 2004, the Catholic Church of Christ the King, Taralga is of State significance as an excellent example and highly intact Inter-War Romanesque Church. Its exterior and interior quality of workmanship is outstanding and has the highest degree of integrity. The church is made even more remarkable for the place and time of its construction in 1934, financially supported by an Irish-Catholic rural community following a period of severe economic depression. The church is a local landmark and its history and visual prominence serves as a reminder of its role in the community. The church contains a collection of significant moveable objects dating back to the construction of the church.

The Catholic Church of Christ the King was listed on the New South Wales State Heritage Register on 30 April 2004 having satisfied the following criteria.

The place is important in demonstrating the course, or pattern, of cultural or natural history in New South Wales.

Church of Christ the King, Taralga is evidence of the growth of the Catholic Church in Taralga.

The place is important in demonstrating aesthetic characteristics and/or a high degree of creative or technical achievement in New South Wales.

The Church of Christ the King, Taralga is an example of a highly intact Inter-War Romanesque Church. The quality and craftsmanship of the exterior and interior of the church is of the highest quality. The church is a landmark building in Taralga. It can be clearly seen from the Goulburn Road approach and is observed throughout the town and its environs serving as a reminder of its role in the community. The church contains a collection of significant moveable objects that adds to its intactness and aesthetic significance.

The place has a strong or special association with a particular community or cultural group in New South Wales for social, cultural or spiritual reasons.

The construction of the Church of Christ, Taralga is remarkable for the place and time of its construction in 1934, financially supported by an Irish-Catholic rural community following a period of severe economic depression. The church contains a collection of moveable objects, many of which were donated by parishioners and dedicated to their deceased relatives and friends.

The place possesses uncommon, rare or endangered aspects of the cultural or natural history of New South Wales.

Church of Christ, Taralga including its interior and moveable objects with such intactness and integrity is rare on a statewide basis.

The place is important in demonstrating the principal characteristics of a class of cultural or natural places/environments in New South Wales.

The Church of Christ the King, Taralga including its interior and moveable objects with such intactness and integrity is representative of inter-war Romanesque architecture.

== See also ==
- Australian non-residential architectural styles
