= O'Connell Road =

Rural road in New South Wales, Australia

O'Connell Road New South Wales
- Coordinates: 33.419380°S 149.614898°E (Northwest end); 33.703520°S 149.846757°E (Southeast end)

General information
- Type: Rural road
- Length: 41.7 km (26 mi)
- Gazetted: August 1928 (as Main Road 256); February 1934 (as Main Road 253)
- Maintained by: Transport for NSW, Oberon Council, Bathurst Regional Council
- Tourist routes: Tourist Route 1

Major junctions
- Northwest end: Great Western Highway; Kelso, New South Wales
- Goulburn-Oberon Road
- Southeast end: Rupert Street; Oberon, New South Wales

Location(s)
- Major settlements: O'Connell

O'Connell Road is a New South Wales rural road linking Oberon to the regional highway hub of Bathurst, where several roads including Great Western Highway, Mid-Western Highway, Mitchell Highway and Bathurst-Ilford Road join.

== Route ==
O'Connell Road commences at the roundabout with Great Western Highway in Kelso, New South Wales (just east of Bathurst) and heads in a southeasterly direction, crossing the Fish River just north of O'Connell, and continuing southeast until it eventually terminates in Oberon. It is fully sealed over its entire length and of high enough standard to accommodate B-double trucks.

In conjunction with Goulburn-Oberon Road from Hume Highway to Oberon, this scenic route provides a leisurely and surprisingly direct route between Bathurst and Goulburn. It is designated part of Tourist Route 1.

== History ==
The passing of the Main Roads Act of 1924 through the Parliament of New South Wales provided for the declaration of Main Roads, roads partially funded by the State government through the Main Roads Board (MRB, later Transport for NSW). Main Road No. 256 was declared along this road on 8 August 1928, from the intersection with Great Western Highway near Bathurst to Oberon (and continuing southwards via Taralga to the intersection with Hume Highway at Goulburn); with the passing of the Main Roads (Amendment) Act of 1929 to provide for additional declarations of State Highways and Trunk Roads, this was amended to Main Road 256 on 8 April 1929.

The Department of Main Roads, which had succeeded the MRB in 1932, truncated the northern end of Main Road 256 to Oberon, and extended the western end of Main Road 253 over it instead, from Oberon to Bathurst, on 13 February 1934.

The passing of the Roads Act of 1993 updated road classifications and the way they could be declared within New South Wales. Under this act, O'Connell Road today is declared part of Main Road 253, from Bathurst to Oberon (and continuing eastwards via the Jenolan Caves and Hampton to the intersection with Great Western Highway at Hartley).

== Major intersections ==
LGA	Location	km	mi	Destinations	Notes
Bathurst	Kelso	0	0.0	Great Western Highway (A32) – Bathurst, Marrangaroo	Northeastern terminus of road and Tourist Route 1, runs south as Littlebourne Street to O'Connell Road
Bathurst	Brewongle	7.2	4.5	Tarana Road – Tarana	
Fish River		16.4	10.2	O'Connell Bridge	
Oberon	O'Connell	18.7	11.6	Mutton Falls Road – Tarana	
Oberon	Oberon	30.0	18.6	Mayfield Road – Mayfield	
Oberon	Oberon	41.1	25.5	Abercrombie Road (southwest) – Taralga, Goulburn; Albion Street (east) – Oberon	Roundabout
Oberon	Oberon	41.6	25.8	Carrington Avenue (Tourist Route 1) – Oberon, Jenolan Caves	Tourist Route 1 continues east along Carrington Avenue
Oberon	Oberon	41.7	25.9	Rupert Street – Oberon, to Abercrombie Road – Taralga, Goulburn	Southwestern terminus of road
1.000 mi = 1.609 km; 1.000 km = 0.621 mi: Route transition

== See also ==
- Highways in Australia
- List of highways in New South Wales
- Fish River
