= Bannaby, New South Wales =

Bannaby
- Town
- Coordinates: 34°27′S 149°58′E
- Country: Australia
- State: New South Wales
- LGA: Upper Lachlan Shire
- Location: 204 km (127 mi) SW of Sydney; 64 km (40 mi) NE of Goulburn

Government
  - State electorate: Goulburn
  - Federal division: Hume
- Elevation: 757 m (2,484 ft)

Population
  - Total: 47 (SAL 2021)
- Postcode: 2580
Localities around Bannaby
Richlands	Wombeyan Caves	Bullio
Taralga	Bannaby	Canyonleigh
Myrtleville	Big Hill	Canyonleigh

Bannaby is a locality in the Southern Tablelands of New South Wales, Australia, within the Upper Lachlan Shire. It is situated near Taralga, on the Bannaby road. At the 2016 census, the population was 36.

== Description ==
The locality includes an Anglican Church and some woolsheds. The Tarlo River National Park begins in the southern part of Bannaby, while the Blue Mountains National Park and Wombeyan Caves are approximately 5 kilometres to the north. Bannaby corresponds to the cadastral parish of Bannaby in the County of Argyle.

== Heritage listings ==
- Hillas Farm Homestead
