= Abercrombie River =

River in New South Wales, Australia

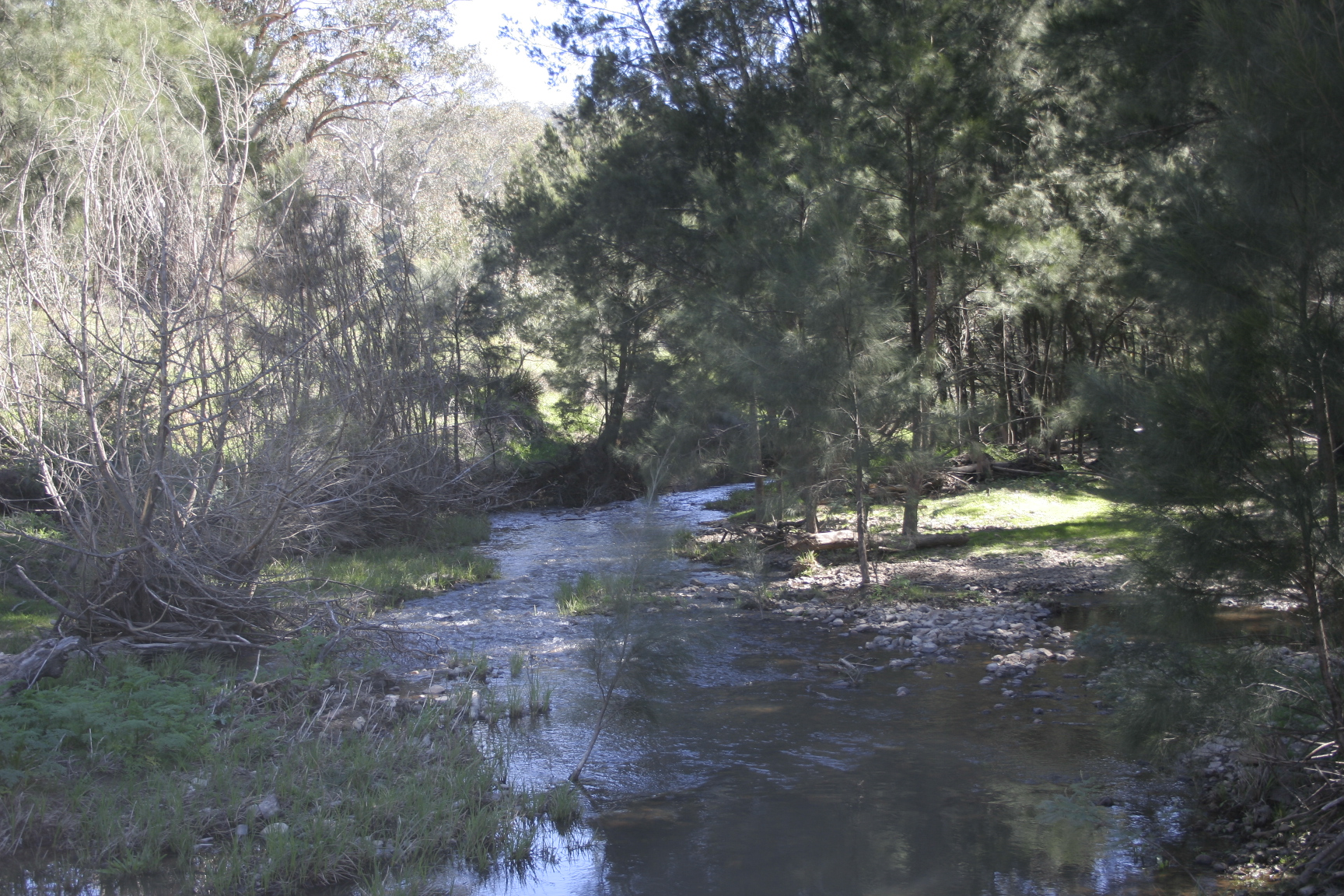

- Location in New South Wales Abercrombie River (Australia)
- Etymology: named by John Thomas Bigge

Location
- Country: Australia
- State: New South Wales
- IBRA: South Eastern Highlands
- District: Central West
- Municipalities: Upper Lachlan, Oberon Shire

Physical characteristics
- Source
  - location: near Mount Werong village
  - coordinates: 34.087°S 149.927°E
  - elevation: 1,130 m (3,710 ft)
- Mouth: Lachlan River
  - location: Wyangala Dam
  - coordinates: 33.919976°S 149.025285°E
  - elevation: 375 m (1,230 ft)
- Length: 130 km (81 mi)
- Basin size: 4,000 km^{2} (1,500 mi^{2})

Basin features
- River system: Murray–Darling basin
- Tributaries
  - left: Burra Burra Creek, Bolong River, Copperhannia Creek
  - right: Isabella River, Tuena Creek, Meglo Creek, Piesleys Creek

Abercrombie River, a perennial river that is part of the Murray–Darling basin, is located in the central west of New South Wales, Australia.

== Course ==
The river rises to the east of the village of Mount Werong and generally flows westward towards its confluence with the Lachlan River at Wyangala Dam near Cowra. The river flows through freehold land as well as the Abercrombie River National Park, and provides habitat for platypus and rakali, dropping 758 metres (2,487 ft) over its course of 130 kilometres (81 mi).

== History ==
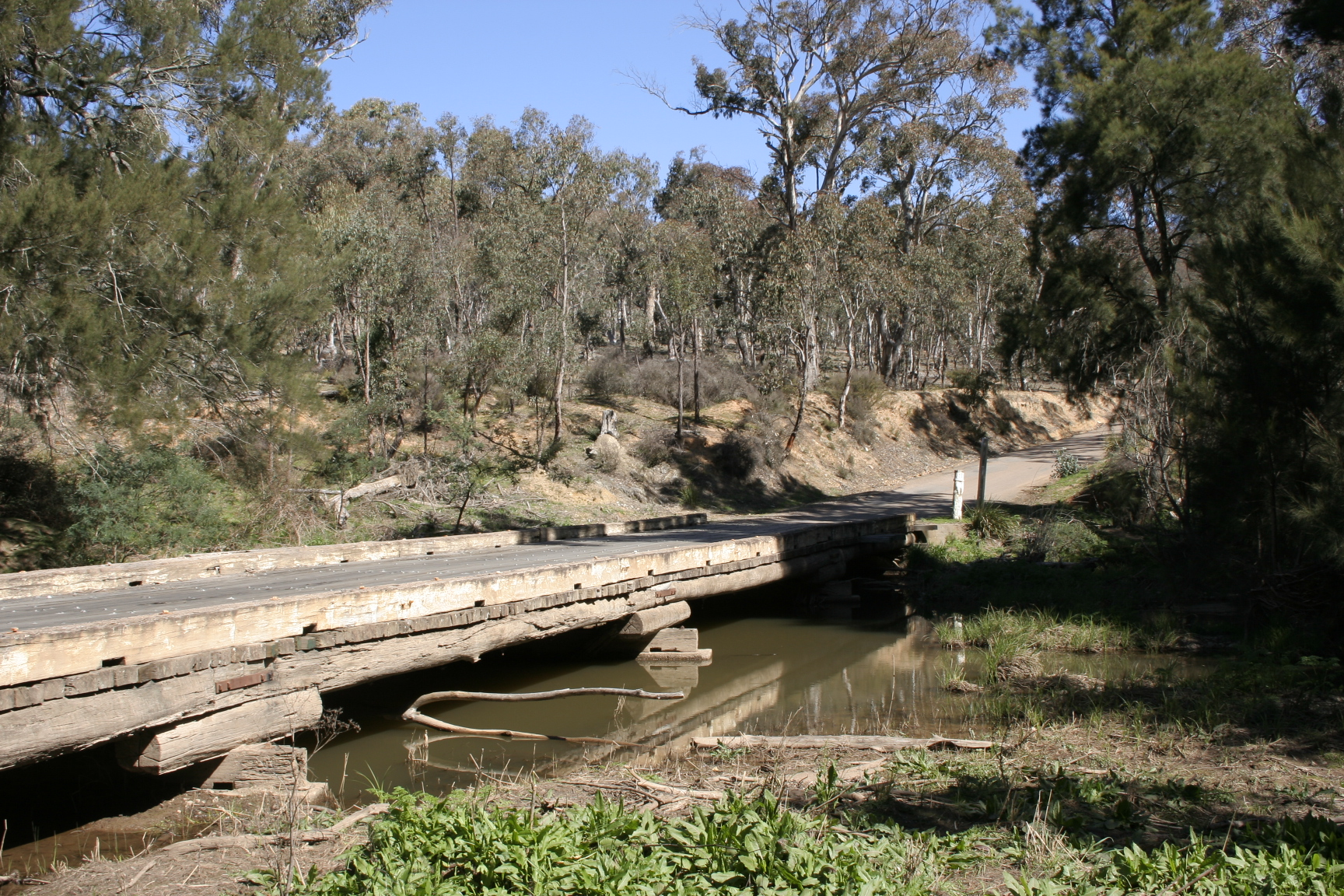
Goulburn-Oberon Road bridge

The original inhabitants of the land alongside the river were Australian Aborigines of the Wiradjuri or Gundungara clans, which may have used the river as a trading route.

The first European to discover the watercourse was explorer Charles Throsby on 5 May 1819, during an expedition from Sydney to the central west of New South Wales. The river was named by Commissioner John Thomas Bigge on 22 October 1820.

Alluvial gold was discovered in and along the river in 1851, inspiring a minor gold rush hampered by the ruggedness of the terrain and the periodic depths of the waterway. Early miners recovered up to 3 oz (85 g) of gold a day along the river, and by 1862 between forty and fifty mining parties were at work at Milburne Creek, a minor tributary of the Abercrombie.

The Goulburn-Oberon Road crosses the Abercrombie River in the steep-sided Abercrombie Gorge.

== See also ==
- List of rivers of Australia
- List of rivers of New South Wales (A-K)
- Rivers of New South Wales
