= Abercrombie River National Park =

National park in New South Wales, Australia

- IUCN category II (national park)
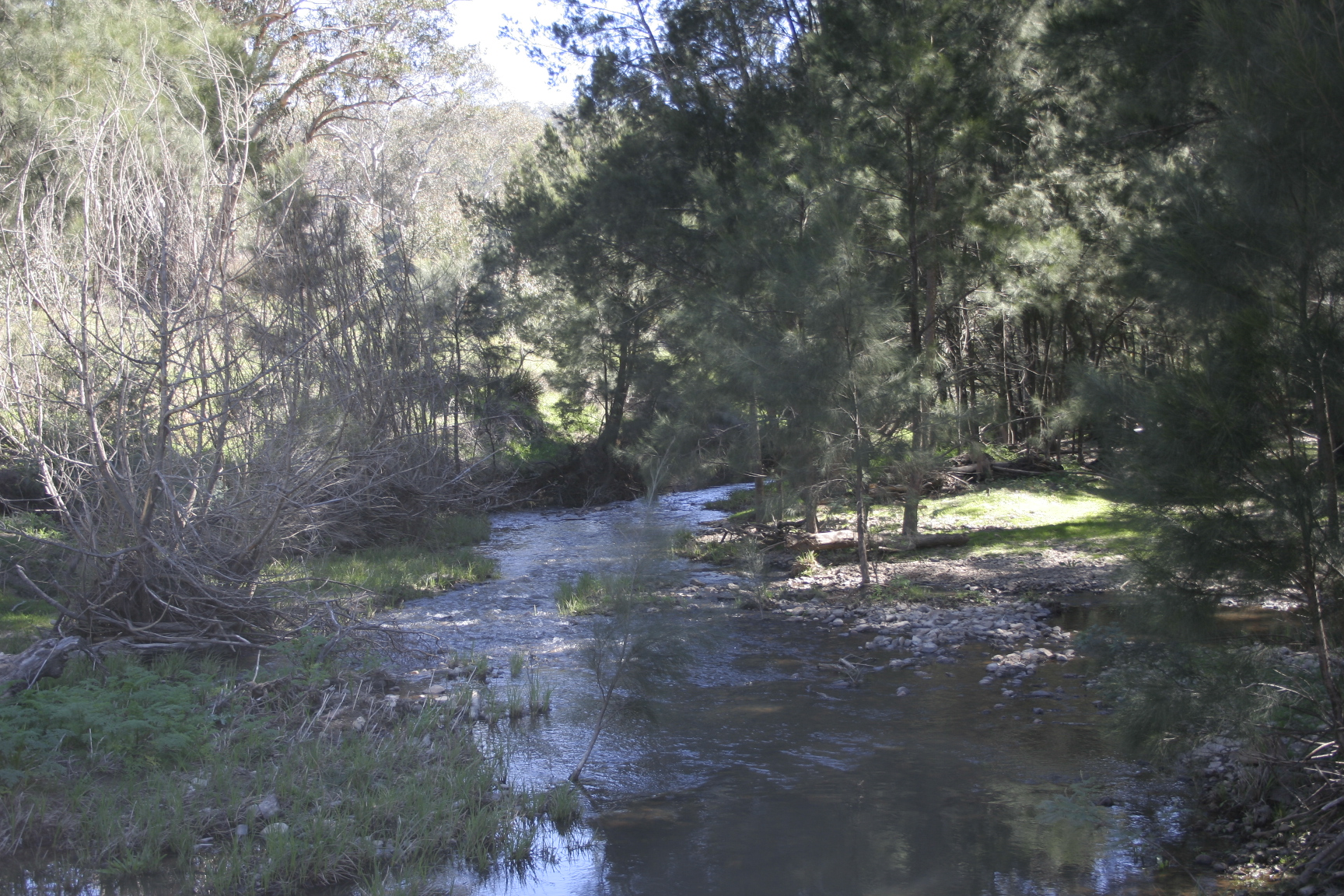
- Abercrombie River, 2007

- Location within New South Wales
- Location: New South Wales
- Nearest city: Oberon
- Coordinates: 34°05′38″S 149°42′27″E
- Area: 190 km^{2} (73 sq mi)
- Established: 22 December 1995
- Governing body: NSW National Parks and Wildlife Service
- Website: https://www.nationalparks.nsw.gov.au/visit-a-park/parks/abercrombie-river-national-park

The Abercrombie River National Park is a protected national park in the Central Tablelands region of New South Wales, in eastern Australia. The 19,000-hectare (47,000-acre) national park is situated approximately 120 kilometres (75 mi) west of Sydney and 40 kilometres (25 mi) south of Oberon.

== Features ==
The park includes the catchments of Silent Creek and the Retreat River, as well as a 42 kilometres (26 mi) section of the Abercrombie River. The Abercrombie River National Park protects an important area of remnant bushland within the south-western Central Tablelands. It contains a diversity of vegetation communities characteristic of montane and tableland species as well as of the western slopes of New South Wales. The park makes an important contribution to nature conservation in the Central West by providing habitat for a number of animal species with large home range requirements and low domestic densities. The park provides opportunities for vehicle touring, bushwalking, swimming, fishing, picnicking and camping amid spectacular scenery. It also provides a pleasant natural break in the landscape between vast areas of cleared grazing land and large areas of pine plantations.

== See also ==
- Protected areas of New South Wales
- List of national parks of Australia
