= Myrtleville, New South Wales =

Myrtleville
- Town
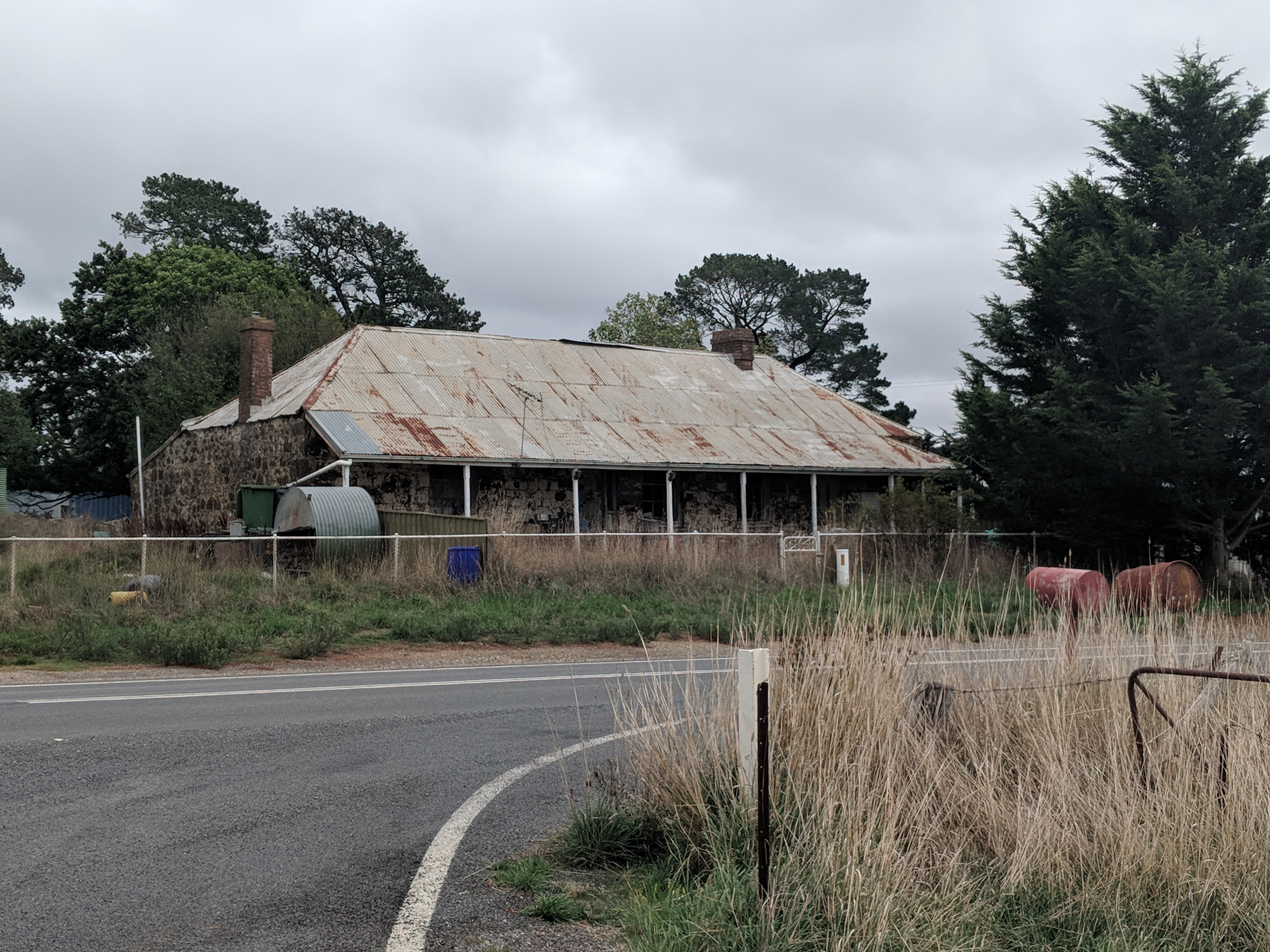

- Coordinates: 34°28′57″S 149°49′02″E
- Country: Australia
- State: New South Wales
- Region: Southern Tablelands
- LGA: Upper Lachlan Shire
- Location: 36 km (22 mi) N of Goulburn; 9 km (5.6 mi) S of Taralga; 126 km (78 mi) NE of Canberra; 230 km (140 mi) WSW of Sydney

Government
  - State electorate: Goulburn
  - Federal division: Riverina
- Elevation: 866 m (2,841 ft)

Population
  - Total: 100 (SAL 2021)
- Postcode: 2580
- County: Argyle
- Parish: Turrallo
Localities around Myrtleville
Taralga	Taralga	Bannaby
Taralga	Myrtleville	Big Hill
Roslyn	Chatsbury	Big Hill

Myrtleville is a locality in the Upper Lachlan Shire, New South Wales, Australia. It lies about 36 km north of Goulburn and 9 km south of Taralga on the road from Goulburn to Oberon and Bathurst. At the 2016 census, it had a population of 72.
