= Richlands, New South Wales =

Richlands
- Town
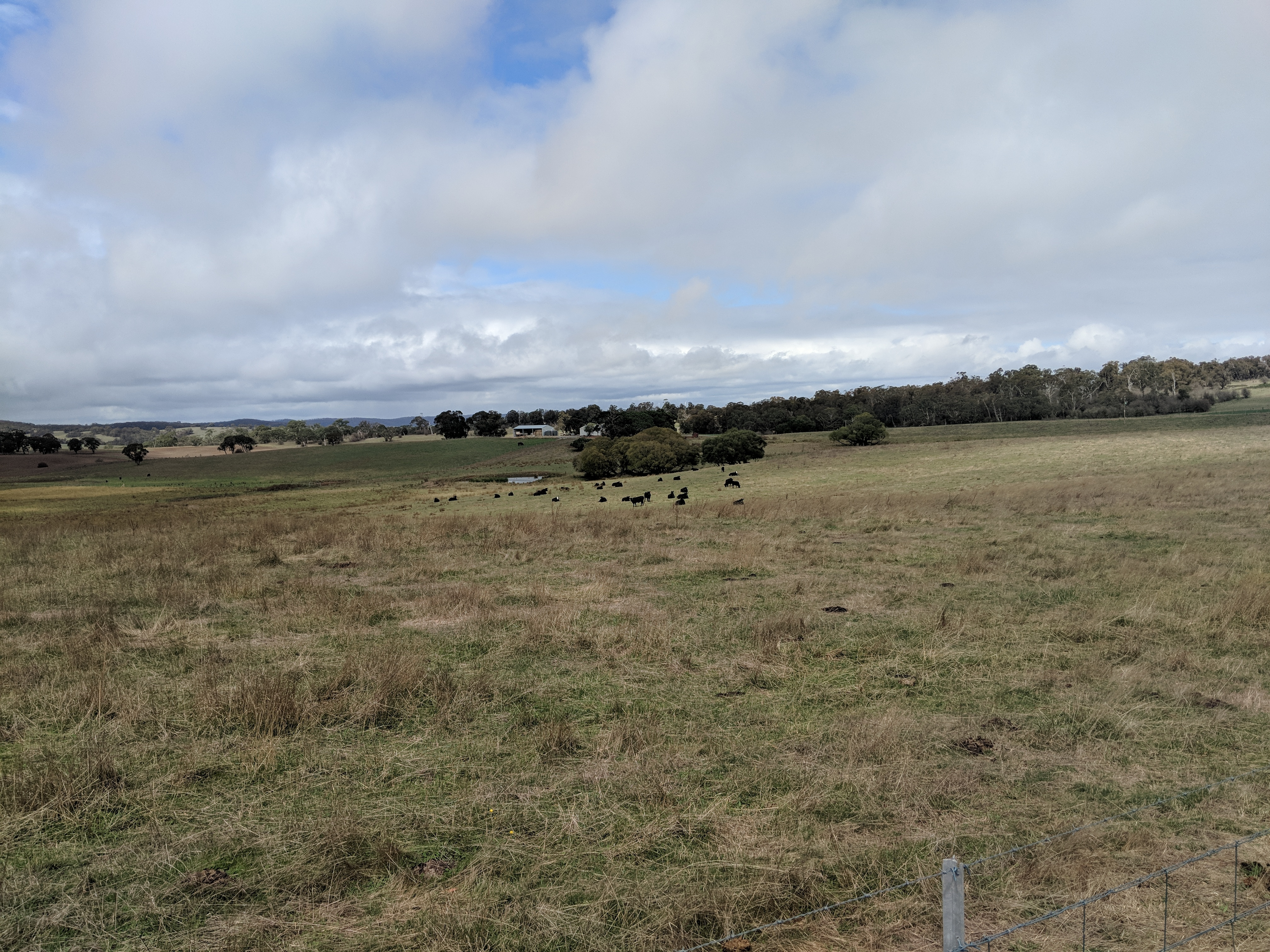

- Coordinates: 34°18′57″S 149°48′02″E
- Country: Australia
- State: New South Wales
- Region: Southern Tablelands
- LGA: Upper Lachlan Shire
- Location: 5 km (3.1 mi) N of Taralga; 95 km (59 mi) S of Oberon; 140 km (87 mi) NE of Canberra; 53 km (33 mi) N of Goulburn; 245 km (152 mi) WSW of Sydney

Government
  - State electorate: Goulburn
  - Federal division: Riverina
- Elevation: 929 m (3,048 ft)

Population
  - Total: 48 (SAL 2021)
- Postcode: 2580
- County: Argyle
- Parish: Guineacor
Localities around Richlands
Yalbraith	Curraweela	Wiarborough
Golspie	Richlands	Wombeyan Caves
Stonequarry	Taralga	Taralga

Richlands is a locality in the Upper Lachlan Shire, New South Wales, Australia. It lies about 5 km north of Taralga and about 95 km south of Oberon on the road from Goulburn to Oberon and Bathurst. At the 2016 census, it had a population of 34. It had a school from June 1868 to August 1879, which was designated as a "provisional school" for eight months and then as a "half-time" school. It also had a school from 1884 to 1915 and from 1918 to 1953, classified most commonly as a "provisional school", but for periods as a "house to house", "half-time" or "public" school. It was called Abercrombie school until 1894.
