= Wombeyan Caves =

Caves in New South Wales, Australia

Wombeyan Karst Conservation Reserve
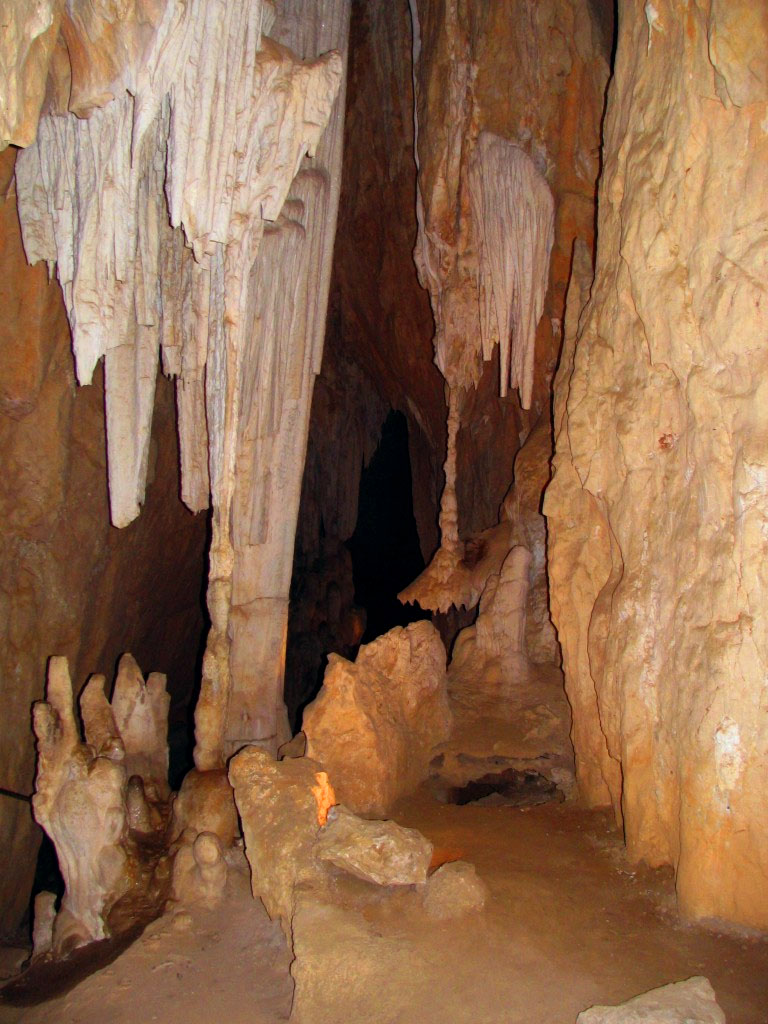
- Fig Tree Cave interior

- Location within New South Wales
- Location: New South Wales
- Nearest city: Taralga
- Coordinates: 34°19′S 149°59′E
- Area: 5.68 km^{2} (2.19 sq mi)
- Established: December 1997
- Governing body: NSW National Parks & Wildlife Service
- Website: Official website

The Wombeyan Caves are caves that have formed in marble, in the Wombeyan Karst Conservation Reserve, New South Wales, Australia. Wombeyan Caves is a tourist attraction and local holiday area, as well as a reserve for endangered species, such as several species of wallaby, bird, possum, and wombat.

== Location ==
It is located within the Southern Highlands about 77 km (48 mi) north of Goulburn. Access is by the Wombeyan Caves Road from either Mittagong in the east or from the Goulburn-Oberon Road in the west. The caves reserve is located towards the western end of the Wombeyan Caves Road. The part of the Wombeyan Caves Road east of the reserve is very rough and has many curves and narrow stretches as it descends down to Wollondilly River and then up very rugged mountains. Some of the views are spectacular.

== Indigenous history ==
Wombeyan Caves are located on the traditional lands of the Burra Burra clan of the Gandangara people in the area covered by the Pejar Local Aboriginal Land Council. Archaeologists have not found evidence of Indigenous occupation of the caves, but flakes and cores from Indigenous tool making, dating from 6,000 to 14,000 years ago, have been found across the Wombeyan Karst Conservation Reserve.

The name of Wombeyan Caves is likely to come from the Ngunnawal language word for ‘tunnel’, referring to the Dreamtime story of the tunnel created by a local version of the rainbow serpent, called Gurangatch. The story was recorded by Robert Hamilton Mathews, who wrote: 'On reaching the source of Jock’s Creek, [Gurangatch] burrowed under the range, coming up inside of Wam-bee-ang caves, which are called Whambeyan by the white people, being a corruption of the aboriginal name.' A tunnel connecting the creek to the caves may be real or imagined, since no tunnel has been found. The cave name has also been spelt as Whambeyan, Wambian, Whombeyan, Wombeian, Wambiang and Wambeean.

Many of the individual caverns within the Wombeyan complex were given Gandangara names by the first government-appointed caretaker of the caves Charles Chalker (1845–1924). These were ‘Wollondilly’, ‘Mulwaree’, ‘Guineacor’, ‘Bullio’, ‘Kooringa’ and ‘Miranda’ caves. The first three are the names of local rivers and Bullio is a nearby locality. ‘Kooringa’ is a word of undocumented origin that could be a local placename. ‘Miranda’ is named after Burra Burra clan leader Murrandah (c.1788–1849).

== Facilities ==
The area was protected as a reserve in 1865. The main site includes several camping grounds, a kiosk, a public phone, a kitchen, and other public facilities. A ranger station is also positioned near the camping site; the rangers serve to collect camping fees from visitors, prevent unsafe human-wildlife association, protect local flora and fauna, and investigate any queries or complaints.

== Sites in the area ==
Caves found in this reserve include the Victoria Arch, one of the most popular due to its proximity to the camping grounds, and Fig Tree Cave, shown in the adjacent picture. Other caves include Junction, Wollondilly, Mulwaree and Kooringa caves. Several NSW caving groups run regular trips to Wombeyan Caves, these are official caving groups that obtain permits for various cave related expeditions.

Other interesting sites are the creek, the waterfall and the various smaller caves found while traversing the extensive forest in the area.

== Fauna ==
The conservation area is a reserve for endangered species, such as several species of wallaby, bird, possum, and wombat. While strict rules are in place concerning human-wildlife interaction, local fauna are growing increasingly tame. Several species of birds, mainly magpies and Indian mynahs, often come into direct contact with people, sometimes less than a foot away, and demanding food while campers are eating. Other birds such as satin bowerbirds, currawongs and rosellas have been seen near the caves. The numerous kangaroo mobs are becoming increasingly trustful, and come within mere metres of campsites with no apparent trepidation. While this is much to the delight of human spectators, concerns are held for the long-term well-being of the local wildlife.
