= Taralga =

- Town
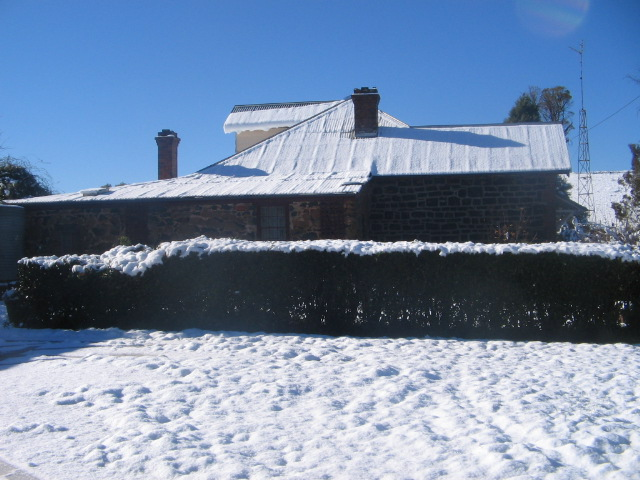
- A basalt house after snowfall

- Interactive map of Taralga
- Coordinates: 34°24′20″S 149°49′07″E
- Country: Australia
- State: New South Wales
- LGA: Upper Lachlan Shire
- Location: 99 km (62 mi) S of Oberon; 44 km (27 mi) N of Goulburn; 135 km (84 mi) NE of Canberra; 237 km (147 mi) WSW of Sydney

Government
  - State electorate: Goulburn
  - Federal division: Riverina
- Elevation: 845 m (2,772 ft)

Population
  - Total: 467 (2016 census)
- Postcode: 2580
- County: Argyle
- Parish: Guineacor
- Mean max temp: 18.3 °C (64.9 °F)
- Mean min temp: 6.1 °C (43.0 °F)
- Annual rainfall: 804.0 mm (31.65 in)
Localities around Taralga
Stonequarry	Richlands	Wombeyan Caves
Laggan	Taralga	Bannaby
Roslyn	Myrtleville	Myrtleville

Taralga is a small village in the Southern Tablelands of New South Wales, Australia, in Upper Lachlan Shire. It is located at the intersection of the Goulburn-Oberon Road and the Laggan-Taralga Road. It is accessible from Oberon to the north, Mittagong to the east, Goulburn to the south, and Crookwell to the west. At the 2016 census, Taralga had a population of 467. Taralga is located relatively close to the famous Wombeyan Caves. The town experiences a volatile climate and is often affected by snow in the winter months.

The population of Taralga has fluctuated over time reflecting the town's fortunes. There were approximately 100 residents in 1863, growing to over 700 by the 1890s. Immediately after the depression of the 1890s, the population shrank to half this size, but recovered by the mid-1950s almost to its peak level. Today the town and its surroundings are home to around 400 people.

== Naming ==
The exact origin of the name Taralga is disputed. The two most widely supported theories are that the village was originally known as "Trial Gang" as within the early colonial boundaries of Argyle County, it was a location for the trials of convicts and bushrangers before the Crown. The second theory is that Taralga comes from the Gundungurra word for Brolga, a bird previously called the "native companion".

A newspaper editorial in 1886 suggests the word Taralga is a corruption of 'Trialgong', an Indigenous word for 'three stony hills' (presumably in the Burra language), rather than a corruption of 'Trial gang'. Also, explorer Thomas Mitchell mentioned 'Trialgong creek' in his field, note and sketchbook in 1828.

== History ==
The area around Taralga was the traditional land of the Burra Burra peoples of the Gundungurra Nation.. Although no major clashes with the Europeans seem to have been recorded, nor tales of collaboration with them, their last great gathering or corroboree seems to have been in the 1830s after which they are not recorded by European history. Accordingly, they would have been pushed further west to less fertile plains after the disease brought by the Europeans.

Charles Throsby passed through the Taralga area in 1819 on a journey from Cowpastures to Bathurst in search of new grazing lands. By 1824, John Macarthur's son James and his nephew Hannibal had established themselves in the Taralga region where they helped pioneer Australia's wool industry. A private village was established on land donated by James Macarthur and cleared by convicts in order to house and service members of the Macarthur family and their employees. Orchard Street, now the main thoroughfare is located on the site of Macarthur's orchard. During the town's early history, Macarthur Street functioned as the main street and many examples of heritage buildings still stand here.

An 1828 census revealed a small number of residents at Taralga suggesting the village was already under way by that time, although there were probably no more than a few buildings. For the first few decades of the colony of New South Wales, most of the settlers were convicts assigned to the landowners and it was they who largely cleared the land, built the huts and houses, and ran the farms. Taralga started to look like a town after the first few houses were built in the 1840s, but more rapid growth would be experienced in the 1860s in part due to the Robertson Land Acts allowing freehold title over land to settlers at favourable rates.

Taralga was officially established as a town in the 1860s, with a school in 1857, and churches—Presbyterian in 1861, St. Ignatius Roman Catholic in 1864, St. Lukes Anglican in 1866 and Methodist (now the Historical Society building) in 1868. There were a number of stores, smiths and artisans' businesses and two hotels recorded in 1866. There was a large increase in population in Taralga after the 1860s, caused mainly by the gold rush bringing new migrants to the area.

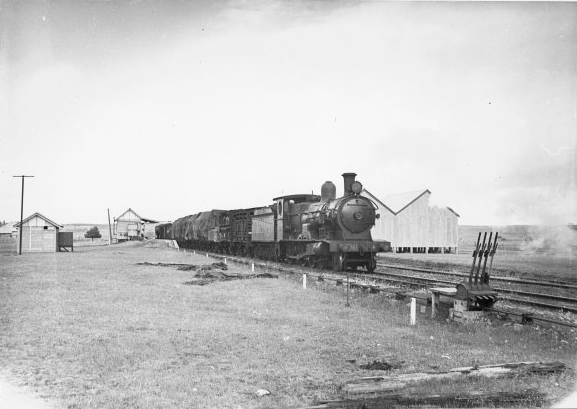
Taralga railway station

In 1923, the town was visited by Premier Sir George Fuller, marking a period of renewed interest and prosperity in Taralga. During that visit, the Premier unveiled a war memorial honouring those residents who served in World War I, turned the first sod for construction of a railway link, and laid the foundation stone for the Taralga Co-Operative Dairy Company's new butter factory. The 25 km (16 mi) Taralga railway line, constructed as a branch from the Crookwell line at Roslyn, opened in 1926 and closed in 1957. The line has since been lifted and little remains of the formation. Electricity was first provided in the 1930s by way of a plant set up by a local, Sid Holt.

== Heritage listings ==
Taralga has a number of heritage-listed sites, including:

- Macarthur Street: Catholic Church of Christ the King

== Taralga today ==
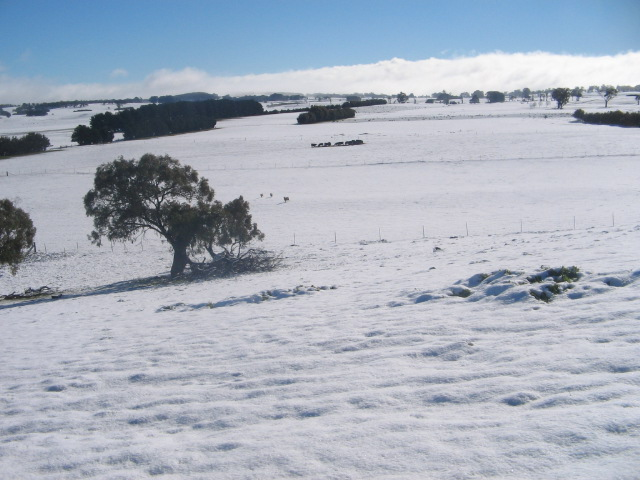
Winter in Taralga

While the population of Taralga declined after the gold rush period, the character of the town did not. Today there are many historically significant buildings to be observed throughout the town. Small vineyards are located around the town. There are two heritage listed hotels, and a sports club with lawn bowling greens and tennis courts. There is a 9-hole golf course with sand greens. The town also hosts the annual "Australia Day Rodeo" and the Taralga Tigers Rugby Club always attracts big crowds during the Winter months and in the summer touch football is played.

The town is situated on the Goulburn-Oberon Road, designated Main Road 256 which was progressively upgraded between 2002 and 2008. Taralga is the largest settlement between the two towns and a convenient stop for travellers between Goulburn and Bathurst wishing to bypass Sydney. The town can also be accessed by rural roads from Crookwell and Marulan.

=== Taralga Wind Farm ===
On 20 February 2012, approval was granted by the New South Wales Government for work to commence on the Taralga Wind Farm. The project will see the construction of 51 wind turbines generating 106.8 Megawatts of electricity on ridges to the east of Taralga. Electricity generated by the project will be fed into the national power grid through a 38 km transmission line to Marulan Substation. The project is expected to create up to 200 local jobs during the construction phase. Approval of the wind farm followed an unsuccessful challenge by the Taralga Landscape Guardians in the Land and Environment Court of New South Wales to block the project on the grounds of aesthetic and environmental impacts including noise emissions and blighting of the landscape. Chief Justice Brian Preston ruled in favour of approving the wind farm as the long-term benefit of reduced greenhouse gas emissions was in the greater public interest. As of 6 February 2015, 30 turbines have been erected on site, and all are turning while in their commissioning phase. The end of construction is expected to happen around June, with the Operational period to follow soon thereafter, once AEMO testing is completed. The layout of the wind farm can be seen through this link

=== Taralga Wildlife Park ===
There is a small wildlife park in Taralga that keeps a number of native and domestic species including bare-nosed wombats, eastern grey kangaroos, hill wallaroos, red-necked wallabies, dingoes, dromedary camel, llama (including hybrid llama-guanaco), alpacas, donkey, miniature horses, fallow deer, blackbuck, eastern bearded dragon, blotched blue-tongued lizards, shingleback lizards, spiny-tailed skinks, wedge-tailed eagle, tawny frogmouth, laughing kookaburra, channel-billed cuckoos, blue-and yellow macaw, cockatoos (sulphur-crest, pink, yellow-tailed black, red-tailed black & gang-gang), parrots, black swans, geese, ducks, royal spoonbill, glossy ibis, helmeted guineafowl, pheasants, turkeys and others.

== Climate ==
Taralga has a temperate oceanic climate (Cfb) due to its high elevation. Temperatures are generally mild to warm in summer, whereas winters are cool to cold during days, with frequent frosts by nightfall. Precipitation is relatively frequent year-round, peaking in June. There are many occurrences of sleet and snow in the cooler months, though mainly in light to moderate quantities. Summers can see frost with the occasional cold front. The area is prone to severe thunderstorms.

The lowest maximum temperature was 1.1 °C (34.0 °F) recorded in August 1962; the highest temperature recorded was 40.5 °C (104.9 °F) in January 2020. The lowest temperature was −9.6 °C (14.7 °F) in July 1982; and the highest minimum on record was 25.7 °C (78.3 °F) in February 2020.

Climate data for Taralga Post Office (1991–2020, extremes 1957–2025); 845 m AMSL; 34.40° S, 149.82° E
Month	Jan	Feb	Mar	Apr	May	Jun	Jul	Aug	Sep	Oct	Nov	Dec	Year
Record high °C (°F)	40.5 (104.9)	40.2 (104.4)	36.3 (97.3)	31.0 (87.8)	25.7 (78.3)	21.5 (70.7)	19.3 (66.7)	22.4 (72.3)	27.5 (81.5)	30.5 (86.9)	38.5 (101.3)	39.5 (103.1)	40.5 (104.9)
Mean maximum °C (°F)	36.0 (96.8)	33.9 (93.0)	29.8 (85.6)	25.2 (77.4)	20.8 (69.4)	16.5 (61.7)	15.7 (60.3)	18.5 (65.3)	23.2 (73.8)	27.0 (80.6)	31.0 (87.8)	33.2 (91.8)	36.7 (98.1)
Mean daily maximum °C (°F)	27.1 (80.8)	25.3 (77.5)	22.6 (72.7)	19.2 (66.6)	15.0 (59.0)	11.5 (52.7)	10.8 (51.4)	12.2 (54.0)	15.7 (60.3)	19.2 (66.6)	22.1 (71.8)	24.8 (76.6)	18.8 (65.8)
Daily mean °C (°F)	19.9 (67.8)	18.9 (66.0)	16.3 (61.3)	12.7 (54.9)	9.1 (48.4)	6.8 (44.2)	5.9 (42.6)	6.6 (43.9)	9.5 (49.1)	12.4 (54.3)	15.2 (59.4)	17.7 (63.9)	12.6 (54.7)
Mean daily minimum °C (°F)	12.7 (54.9)	12.5 (54.5)	9.9 (49.8)	6.2 (43.2)	3.1 (37.6)	2.0 (35.6)	0.9 (33.6)	1.0 (33.8)	3.2 (37.8)	5.5 (41.9)	8.2 (46.8)	10.5 (50.9)	6.3 (43.4)
Mean minimum °C (°F)	5.7 (42.3)	6.0 (42.8)	2.6 (36.7)	−0.9 (30.4)	−3.3 (26.1)	−4.7 (23.5)	−4.9 (23.2)	−5.0 (23.0)	−2.9 (26.8)	−1.1 (30.0)	0.5 (32.9)	2.8 (37.0)	−6.0 (21.2)
Record low °C (°F)	1.1 (34.0)	1.2 (34.2)	−1.1 (30.0)	−4.0 (24.8)	−6.5 (20.3)	−7.8 (18.0)	−9.6 (14.7)	−7.3 (18.9)	−6.0 (21.2)	−4.8 (23.4)	−2.5 (27.5)	−0.2 (31.6)	−9.6 (14.7)
Average rainfall mm (inches)	61.7 (2.43)	94.0 (3.70)	65.1 (2.56)	38.0 (1.50)	42.8 (1.69)	77.4 (3.05)	57.9 (2.28)	67.5 (2.66)	60.8 (2.39)	61.9 (2.44)	74.5 (2.93)	69.6 (2.74)	771.2 (30.37)
Average rainy days (≥ 1 mm)	7.8	8.2	7.6	5.7	6.4	9.7	8.9	8.4	8.1	7.2	8.3	8.3	94.6
Source: Bureau of Meteorology

== Gallery ==
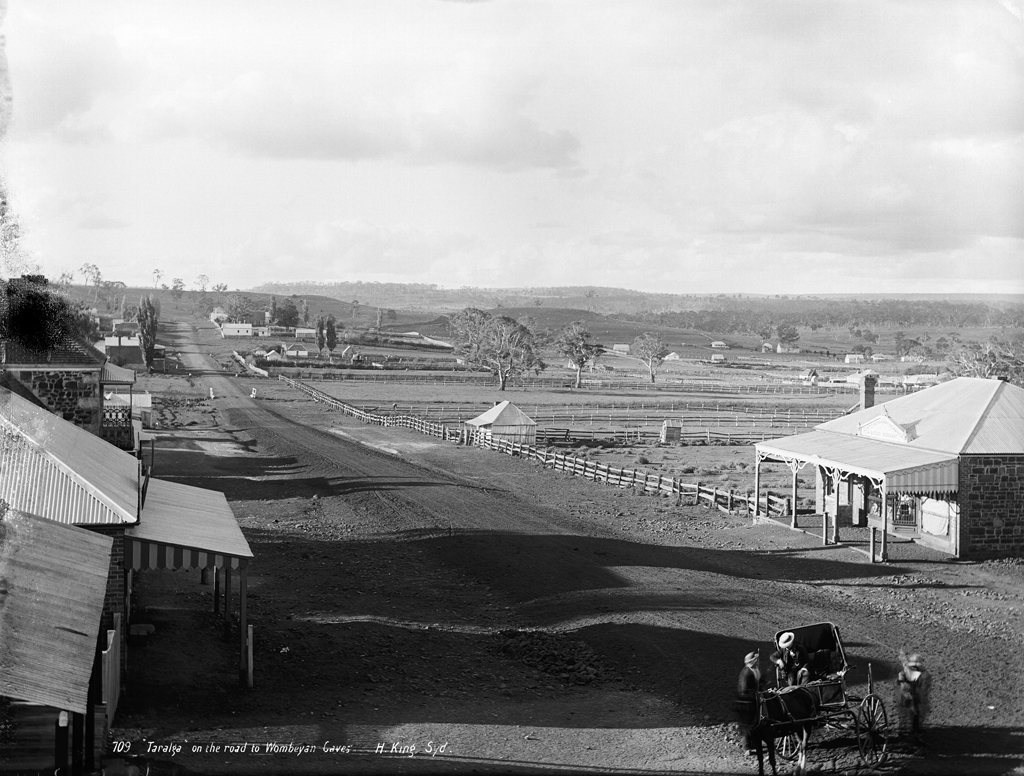
Taralga c1900

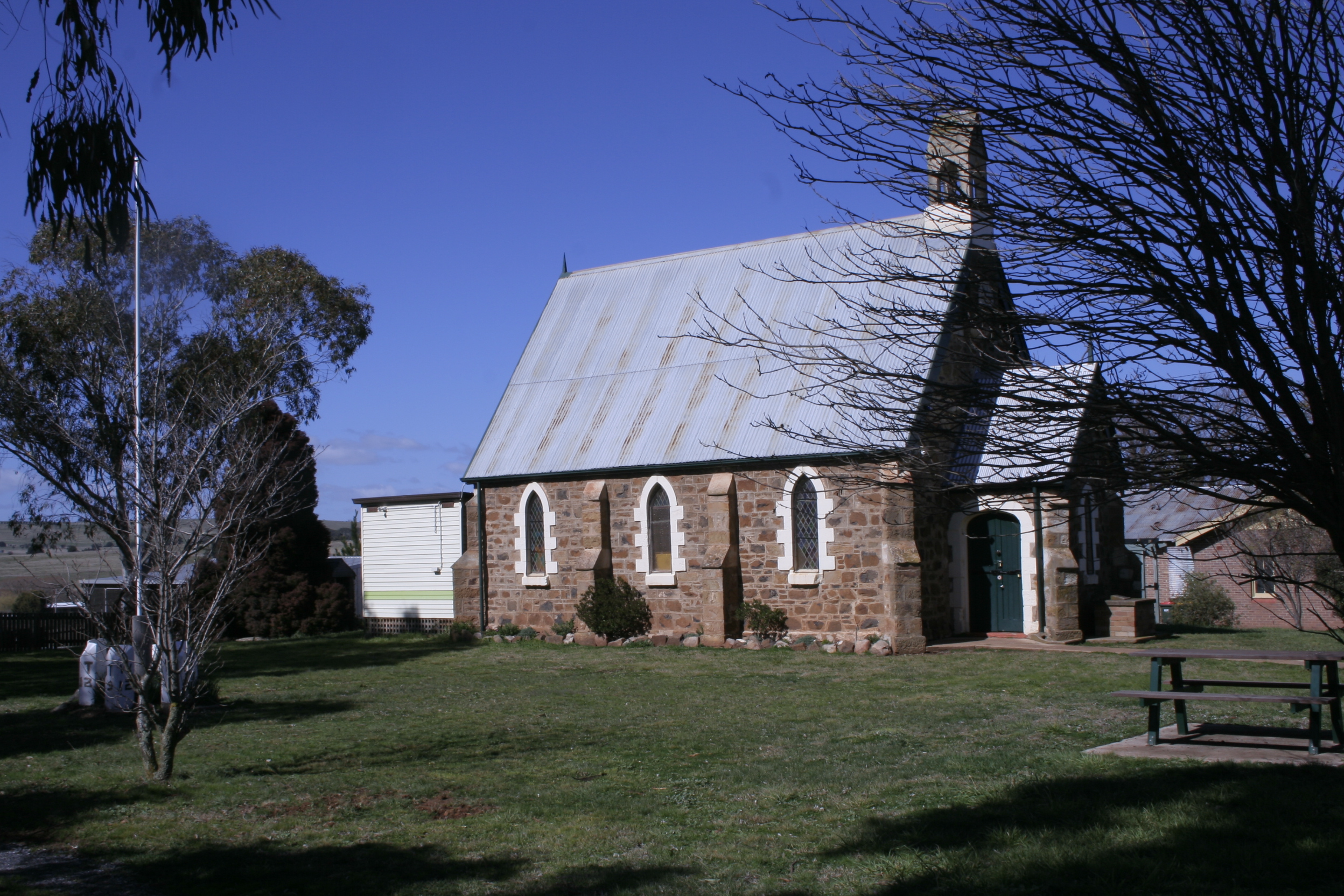
Taralga Church

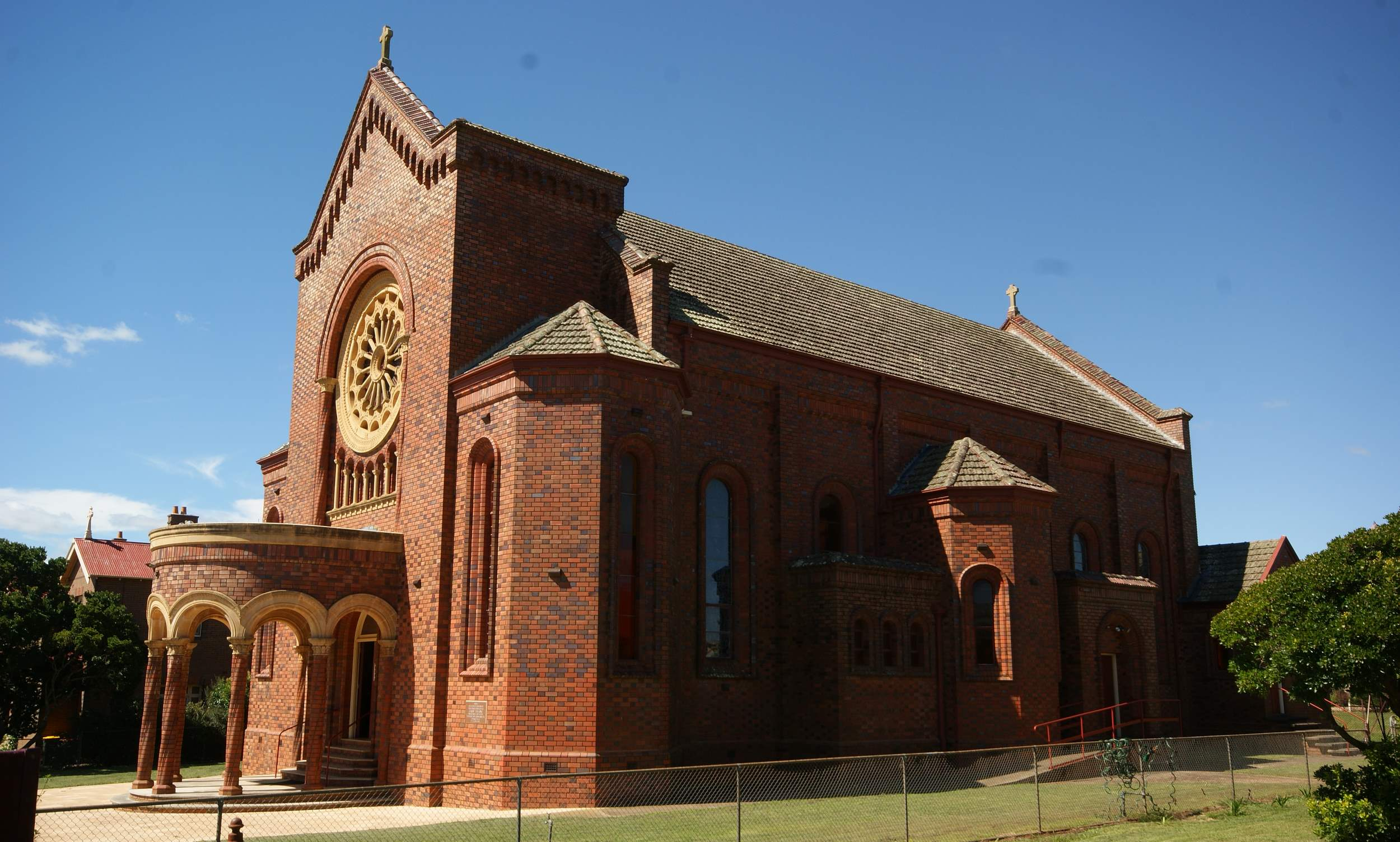
Taralga Catholic Church

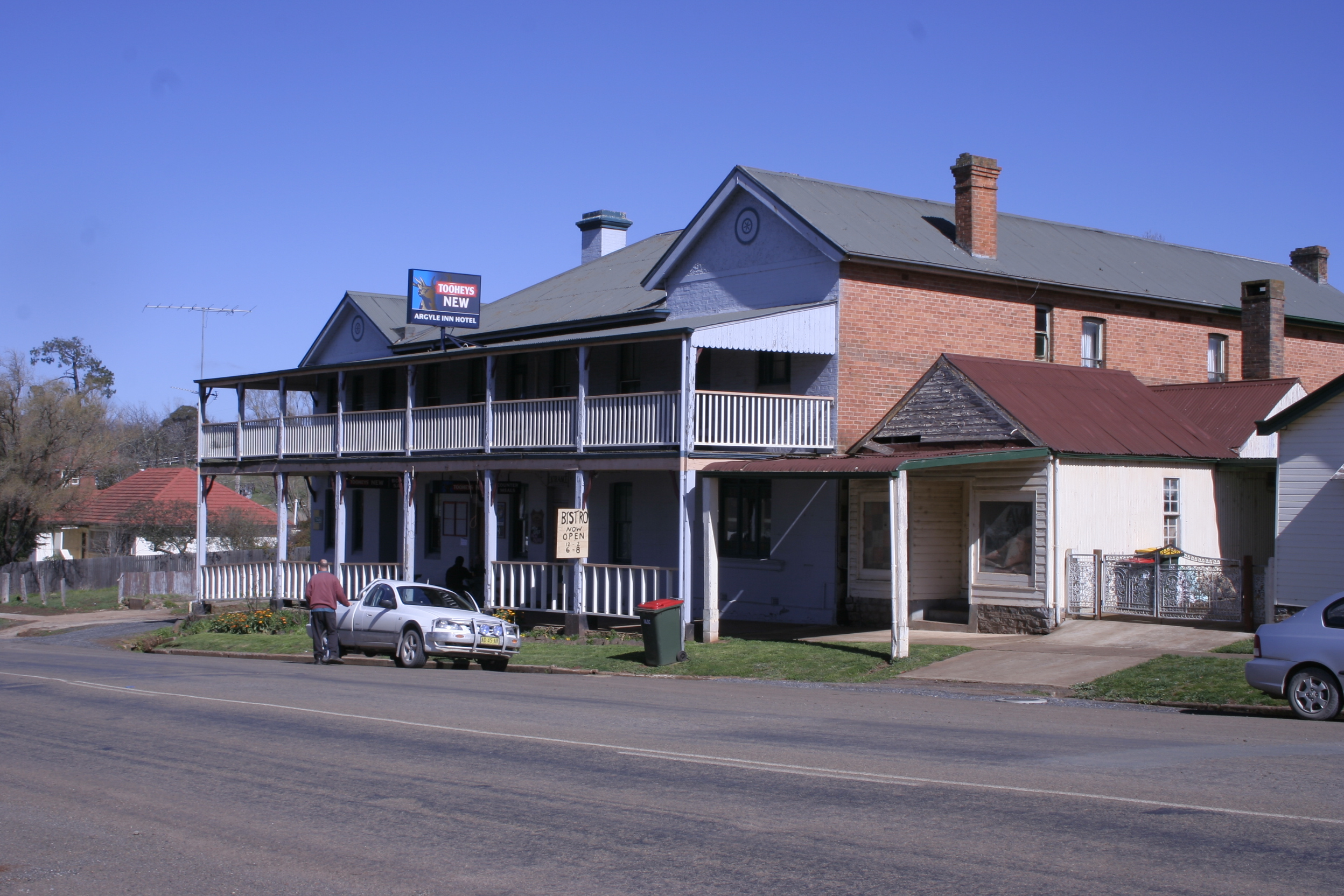
Taralga Main Street

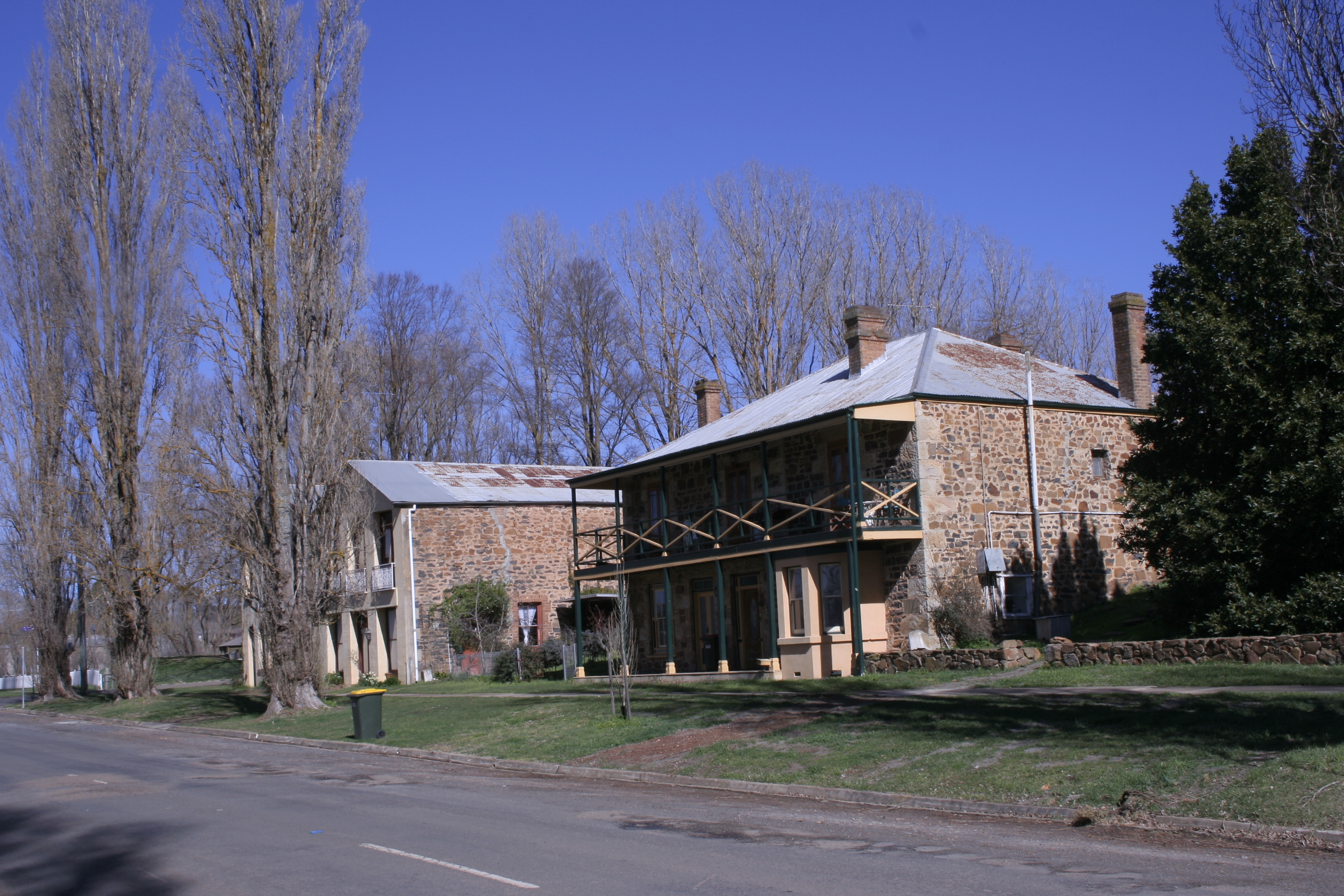
Taralga Main Street

== See also ==
- Bannaby
- Wombeyan Caves
- Crookwell
- Goulburn
