= Kanangra =

Kanangra is an Australian Aboriginal word for "beautiful view" and may refer to:

- Kanangra (ferry), a retired passenger ferry on Sydney Harbour
- Kanangra-Boyd National Park, located in the Central Tablelands region of New South Wales in Australia
- Kanangra Creek, a creek in the Kanangra-Boyd National Park
- Kanangra Falls, a waterfall on the Kanangra Creek
- Kanangra wattle, a shrub belonging to the genus Acacia and the subgenus Phyllodineae that is endemic to New South Wales
