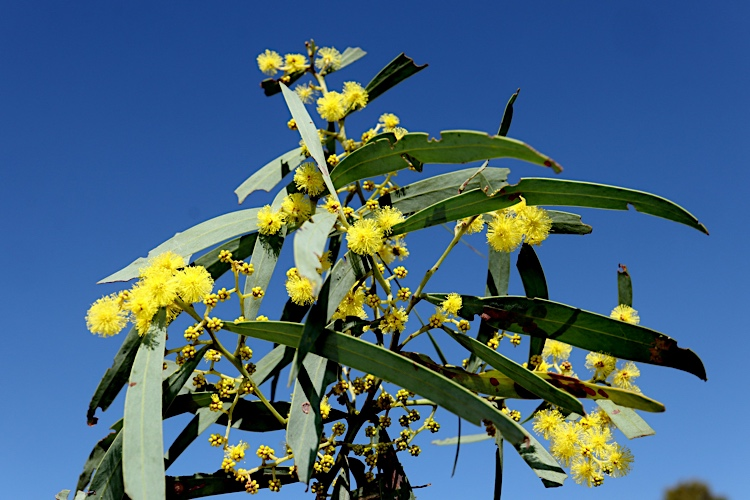
- In the ANBG

Scientific classification
- Kingdom: Plantae
- Clade: Tracheophytes
- Clade: Angiosperms
- Clade: Eudicots
- Clade: Rosids
- Order: Fabales
- Family: Fabaceae
- Subfamily: Caesalpinioideae
- Clade: Mimosoid clade
- Genus: Acacia
- Species: A. barringtonensis

Binomial name
- Acacia barringtonensis Tindale
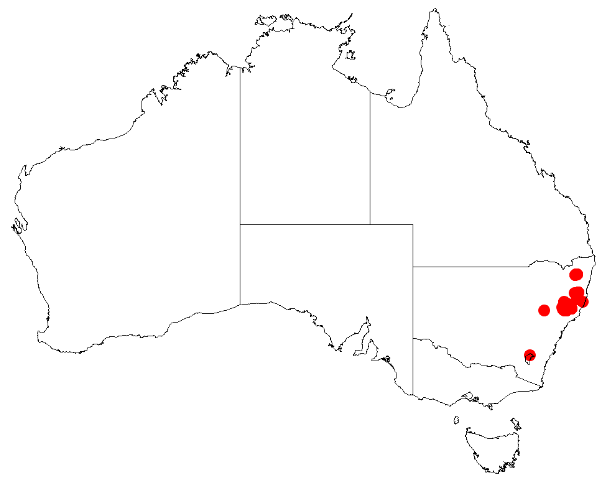
- Occurrence data from AVH

Synonyms
- Racosperma barringtonense (Tindale) Pedley

= Acacia barringtonensis =

Barrington wattle

Species of shrub

Acacia barringtonensis, commonly known as Barrington wattle, is a species of flowering plant in the family Fabaceae and is endemic to New South Wales. It is an erect or spreading shrub or small tree with narrowly elliptic or narrowly oblong phyllodes, spherical heads of golden-yellow flowers and straight or slightly curved pods up to 80 mm (3.1 in) long.

== Description ==
Acacia barringtonensis is an erect or spreading shrub or small tree that typically grows to a height of 1–6 m (3 ft 3 in – 19 ft 8 in) with angled, minutely hairy branchlets. Its phyllodes are narrowly elliptic or narrowly oblong, 50–100 mm (2.0–3.9 in) long, 5–15 mm (0.20–0.59 in) wide, usually with minute hairs pressed against the surface and a gland usually 5–23 mm (0.20–0.91 in) above the pulvinus. The flowers are borne in racemes mostly 15–35 mm (0.59–1.38 in) long, each head spherical 3.5–5.0 mm (0.14–0.20 in) in diameter with mostly eight to sixteen golden-yellow flowers on a pedicel 2–5 mm (0.079–0.197 in) long. Flowering occurs from September to November and the pods are straight to slightly curved, firmly papery to thinly leathery, 30–80 mm (1.2–3.1 in) long and 8–12 mm (0.31–0.47 in) wide. The seeds are oblong to elliptic, black and slightly shiny, 4–6 mm (0.16–0.24 in) long with a white, thread-like aril on the end.

== Taxonomy ==
Acacia barringtonensis was first formally described in 1975 by the botanist Mary Tindale in the journal Telopea from specimens collected on the Barrington Plateau 58 km (36 mi) north-east of Scone in 1960. The specific epithet is a reference to Barrington Tops located in the Mount Royal Range where the type specimen was found. It is closely related to A. clunies-rossiae , A. caesiella and A. dorothea.

== Distribution ==
Barrington wattle is found in north eastern New South Wales, commonly in the Great Dividing Range from Gibraltar Range National Park in the north down to Barrington Tops National Park in the south where it is often situated around creeks and among or along the edges of swamps growing in granite or basalt based soils as a part of Eucalyptus woodland communities, usually at altitudes 1,000 m (3,300 ft) or higher.

== See also ==
- List of Acacia species
