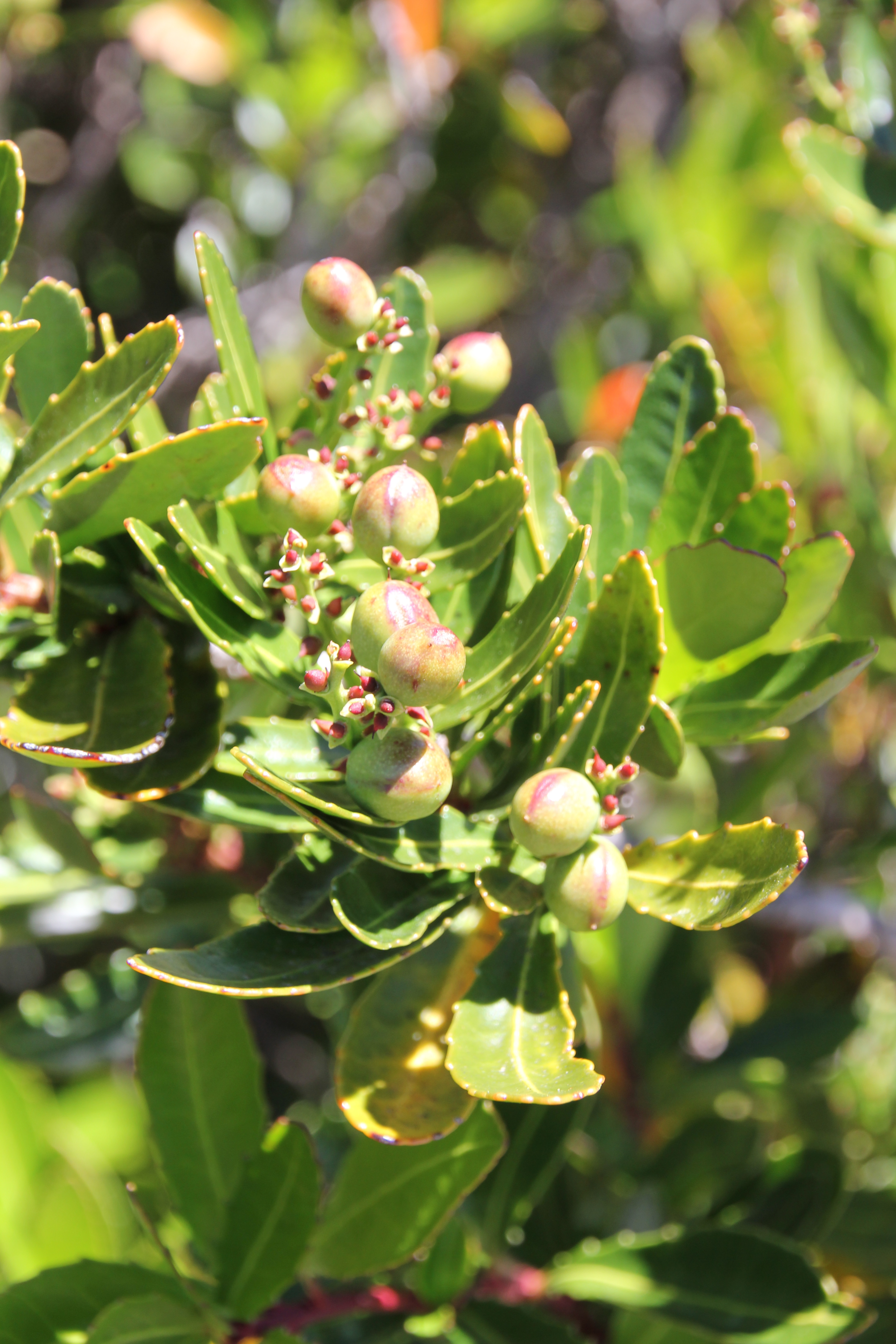

Scientific classification
- Kingdom: Plantae
- Clade: Tracheophytes
- Clade: Angiosperms
- Clade: Eudicots
- Order: Proteales
- Family: Proteaceae
- Subfamily: Proteoideae
- Genus: Cenarrhenes; Labill.
- Species: C. nitida

Binomial name
- Cenarrhenes nitida Labill.

= Cenarrhenes =

Port Arthur plum

Monotypic genus of plants

Cenarrhenes is a monotypic genus in the family Proteaceae containing the single species Cenarrhenes nitida, known as the Port Arthur plum or native plum. Cenarrhenes nitida is an evergreen shrub to small tree endemic to the rainforests and scrublands of western Tasmania. It bears white flowers in late spring followed by the development of fleshy fruit.

== Taxonomy and naming ==
The French naturalist and explorer Jacques Labillardière described Cenarrhenes nitida in 1805, from a location described as in capite Van Diemen (Tasmania). It still bears its common name today. The genus name is derived from the Ancient Greek words kenos 'empty' and arrhen 'male', referring to the four staminode-like hypogynous glands. The genus only contains one species (monotypic). The specific epithet is the Latin adjective nitida 'bright, shining', referring to its glossy leaves.

Although it resembles the persoonias in appearance, it does not appear to be related to them. Instead, it has been grouped with the Australian genera Agastachys, Symphionema and New Caledonian genera Beauprea and Beaupreopsis in the subtribe Cenarrheninae by Johnston and Briggs in 1975. It remained in its own subtribe in the publication of Flora of Australia in 1995, within the tribe Conospermeae and subfamily Proteoideae. In 1998 Sara Hoot and Andrew Douglas analysed chloroplast sequences and found that Cenarrhenes was sister to a clade comprising the three genera Stirlingia, Conospermum and Synaphea. Peter H. Weston and Nigel Barker reviewed the suprageneric relationships of the Proteaceae in 2006, using molecular and morphological data. In this scheme, Cenarrhenes is located within the subfamily Proteoideae on account of it having cluster roots, a solitary ovule and indehiscent fruits. In a phylogenetic study including all the Proteaceae genera, it was found that it was most closely related to the genera Beaupreopsis (New Caledonia) and Dilobeia (Madagascar).

Port Arthur plum and native plum are common names given to the species.

== Description ==
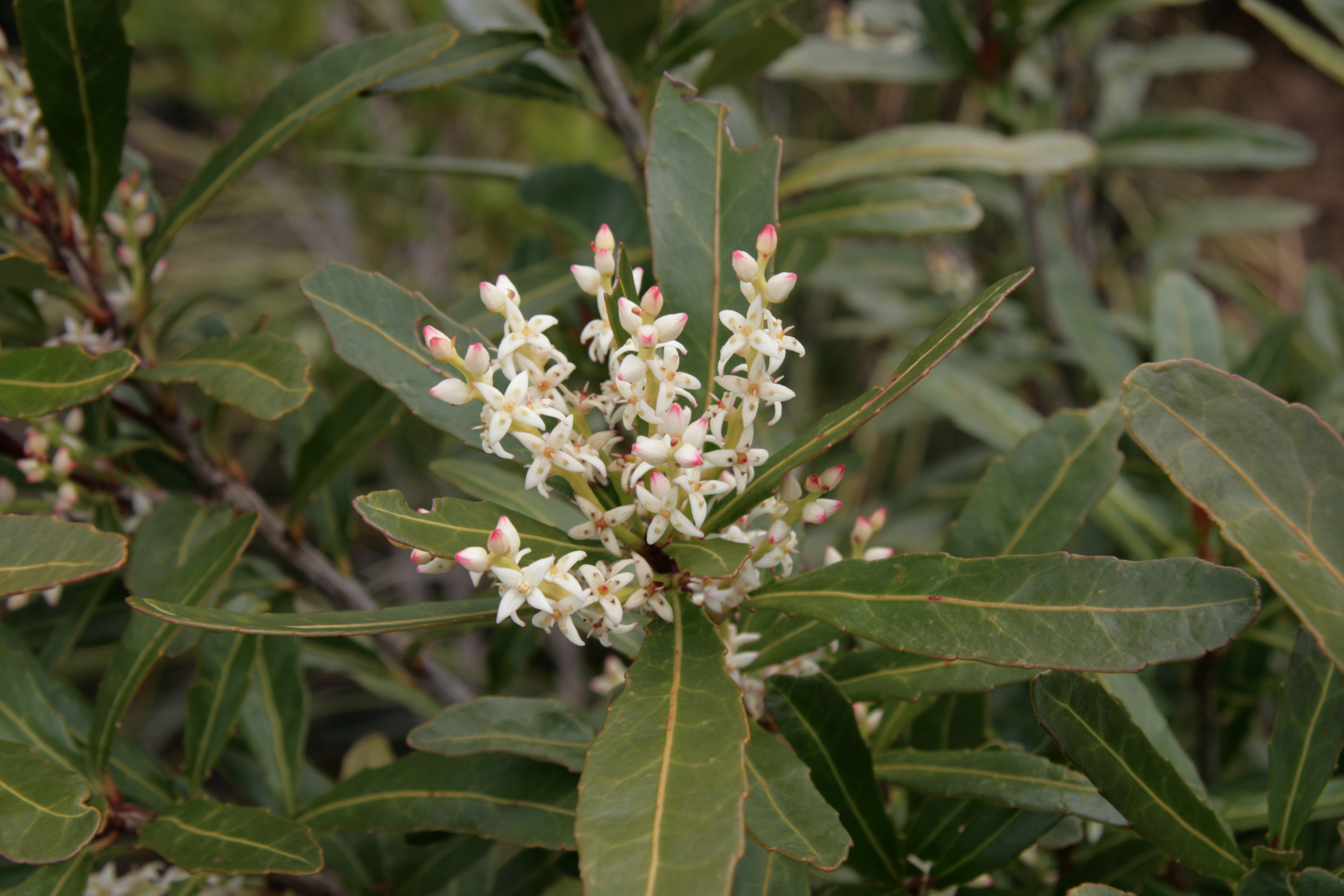
The white flowers have pink tips in bud.

Cenarrhenes nitida forms an erect shrub to small tree ranging in height from 10 m (33 ft) in sheltered sites such as rainforests to 2 m (6.6 ft) in exposed sites. Its leaves, which are roughly 8 to 12 cm (3.1 to 4.7 in) long, are thick, dull and hairless with a cleanly serrated edge and rounded tip. These are attached to the stem via a short stalk. The leaves are spread along the branches and have a nauseating stale-cabbage smell when crushed which helps distinguish it from Anopterus glandulosus (Escalloniaceae), which looks similar but lacks the smell and the leaves are often longer and arranged in false whorls. The leaves turn black when dried.

The flowers are produced in early summer from November to December and are small, symmetrical, and unscented. Each flower has four, pointed, fleshy petals, which curl backward when open. Closed flowers have pink tips but turn all white when open. The flowers are stalkless and arranged on woody spikes, which are shorter than the leaves. The flowers are insect-pollinated and have four, thick, cream-yellow stamens. The pollination is spring-loaded and is triggered by a touch sensitive hair on one of the four anthers. Often, only one to three flowers per stalk will develop into mature fruit with the remainder forming stunted woody balls.

The fruit of C. nitida are a fleshy drupe, which closely resemble commercial plums from the genus Prunus, hence the common name. They are roughly 1.5 cm (0.6 in) in size, but can get up to 3 cm (1.2 in). They have a smooth, deep purple skin, edible but chalky tasting pink-white flesh and a large stone at the center. Much like plums, the fruit have a groove running down one side of the fruit and a fine dusty layer on the skin giving it a bluish colour, which is easily removed by rubbing. Fruit ripen in autumn from March to May.

== Distribution and habitat ==
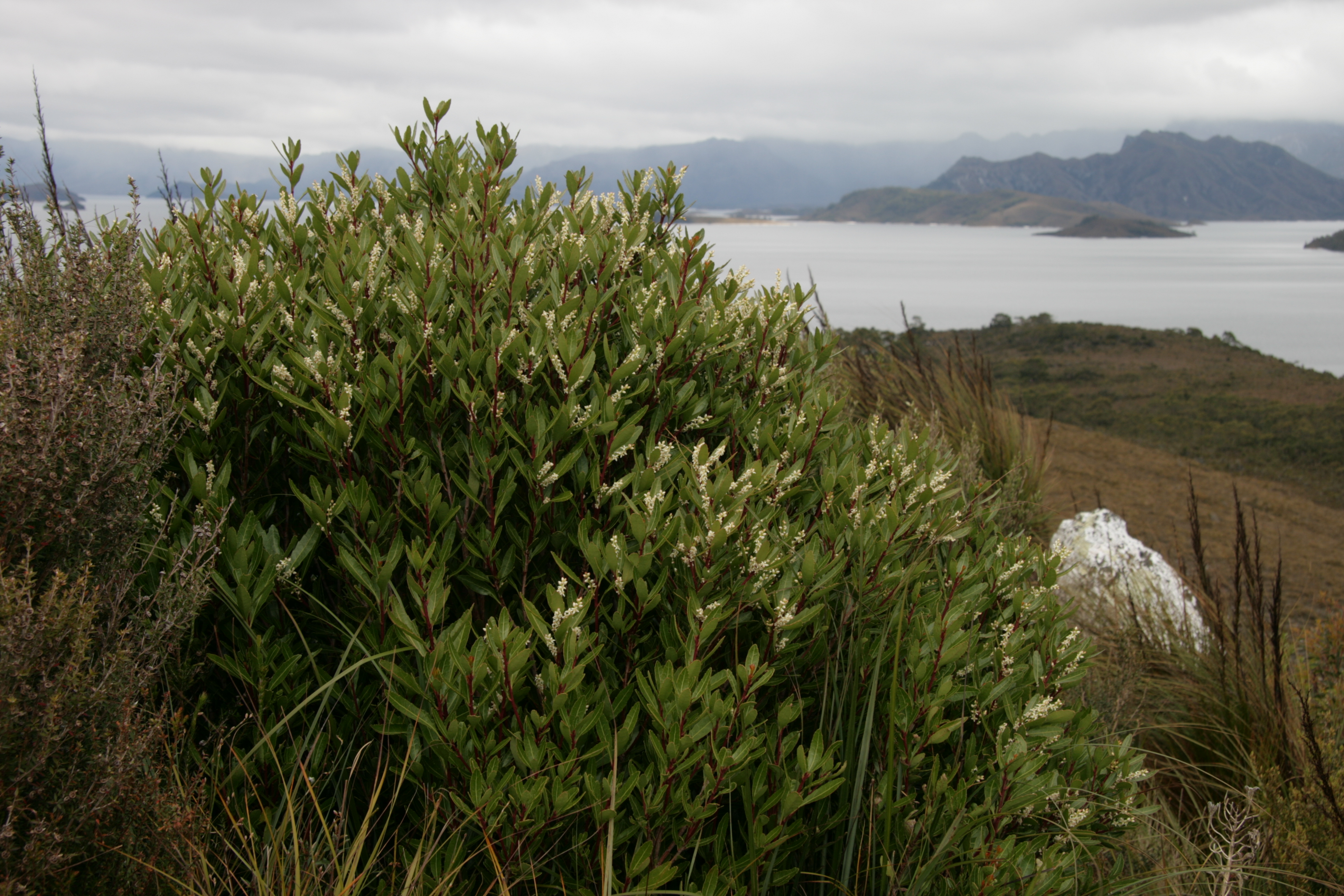
Cenarrhenes nitida at Lake Pedder lookout, Tasmania

Cenarrhenes nitida is endemic to southern and western Tasmania and some of its islands, growing to an altitude of 800 m (2,600 ft), and reaching the margins of the alpine zone. It occurs most often as an understory tree to small shrub in wet sclerophyll forests and rainforest with poor soils and occasionally in heath, button grass sedgeland and scrub. Offshore populations occur inland on South Bruny Island and in forested areas of the De Witt Islands, which closely resemble environments on mainland Tasmania.

== Cultivation ==
Cenarrhenes nitida is a slow growing plant which requires a cool, moist, shady site with well composted soils and preferably good drainage. The seeds mature after the flesh has been removed and the stone allowed to dry. The seeds can be stored this way so long as they are kept in a well ventilated place. Germination is triggered by temperatures of roughly 20 °C (68 °F) after at least two months of cold stratification. C. nitida is often difficult to propagate and can be very slow growing if conditions are not right. They are best grown from seed as cuttings will remain green for considerable lengths of time without developing roots before turning brown.
