= Symphionema paludosum =

Scientific classification
- Kingdom: Plantae
- Clade: Tracheophytes
- Clade: Angiosperms
- Clade: Eudicots
- Order: Proteales
- Family: Proteaceae
- Genus: Symphionema
- Species: S. paludosum

Binomial name
- Symphionema paludosum R.Br.
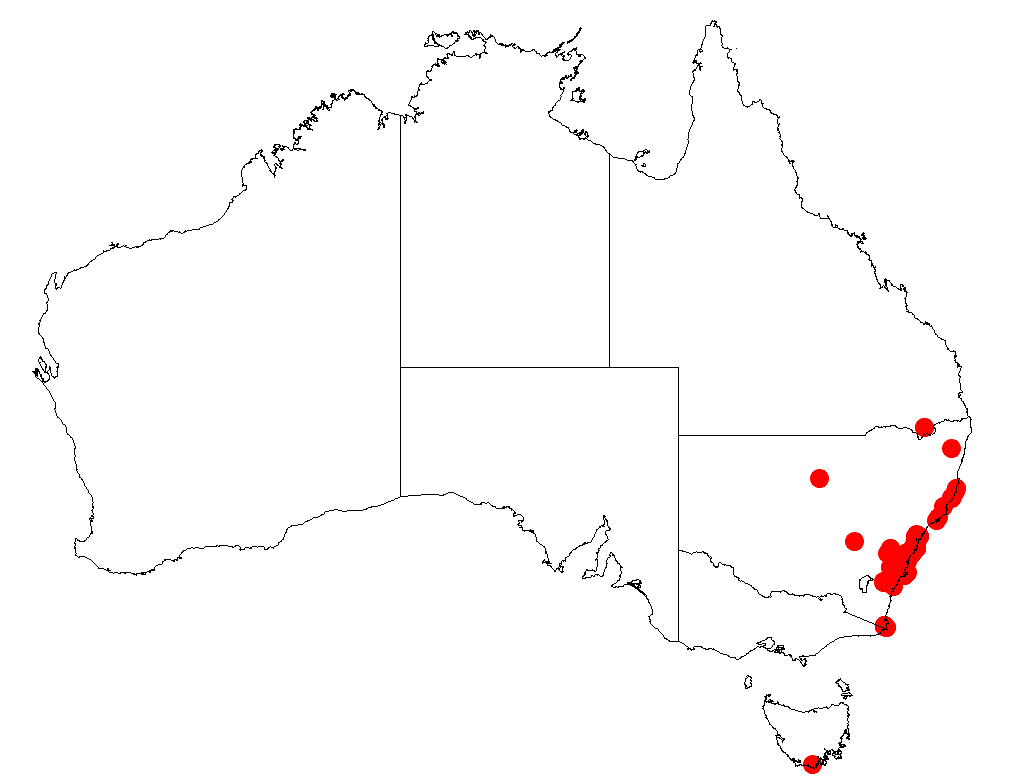
- Occurrence data from Australasian Virtual Herbarium

Species of plant endemic to Australia

Symphionema paludosum is a species of flowering plant in the family Proteaceae. It is endemic to New South Wales in eastern Australia. It is one of the many species authored by Robert Brown.

== Description ==
It forms a sparsely stemmed, herbaceous subshrub growing usually to 30–50 cm (12–20 in), occasionally to 75 cm (30 in) tall. Its leaves are trifoliate and 10–30 mm (0.4–1.2 in) long. Its flowers are borne as spiky, pale yellow inflorescences. The fruits are oblong and about 2 mm long.

== Distribution and habitat ==
The plant is found in swampy heath habitats. It occurs discontinuously in coastal areas from just north of Port Macquarie southwards to the Victorian border, as well as on the escarpment from Kanangra Tops to the Budawang Range.
