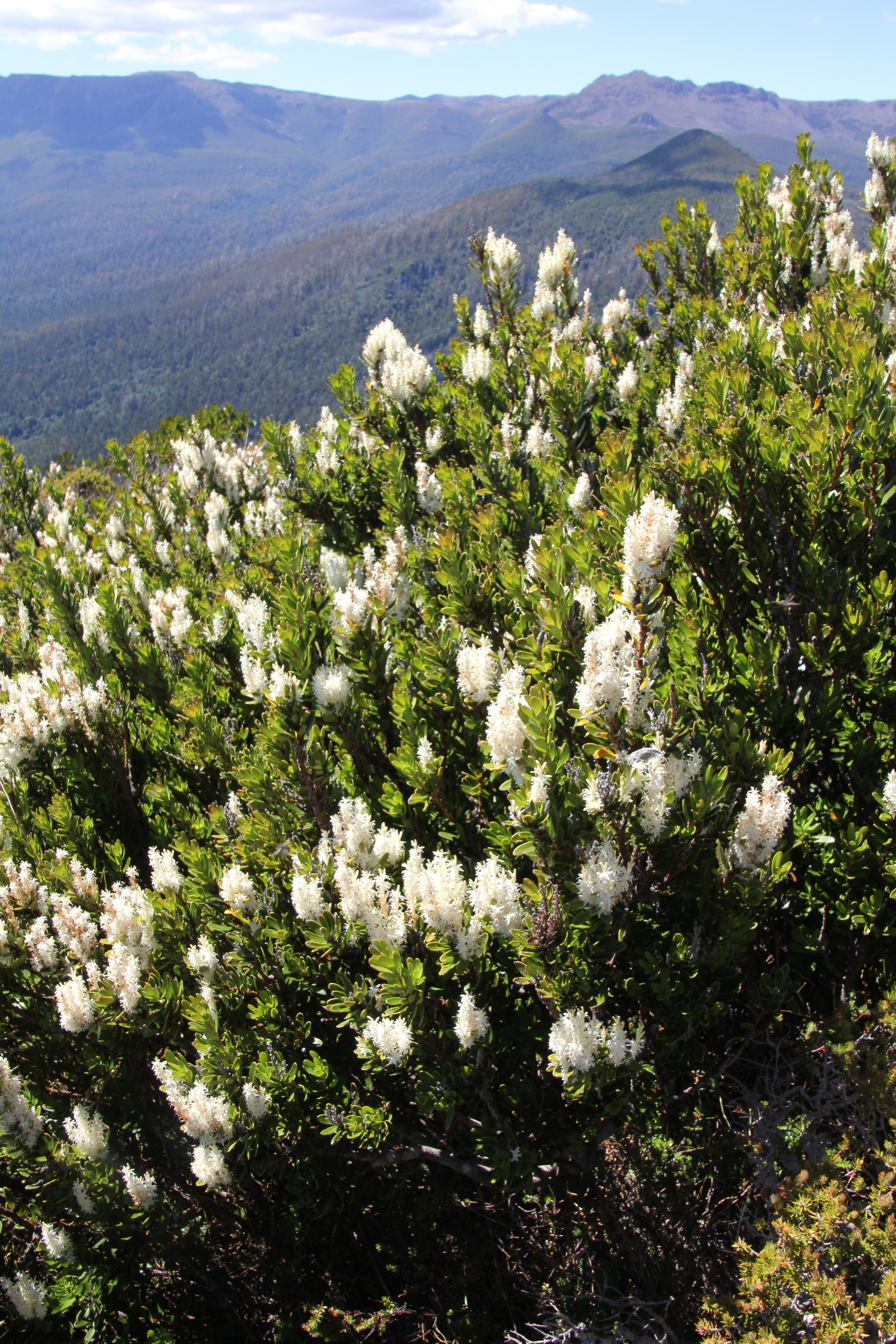

Conservation status
- Least Concern (IUCN 3.1)

Scientific classification
- Kingdom: Plantae
- Clade: Tracheophytes
- Clade: Angiosperms
- Clade: Eudicots
- Order: Proteales
- Family: Proteaceae
- Subfamily: Symphionematoideae
- Genus: Agastachys; R.Br.
- Species: A. odorata

Binomial name
- Agastachys odorata R.Br.

= Agastachys =

White waratah

Monotypic genus of flowering shrub

Agastachys odorata, commonly known as the white waratah or fragrant candlebush, is the sole member of the genus Agastachys in the plant family Proteaceae. It is an evergreen shrub to small tree and is endemic to the heaths and buttongrass sedgelands of western Tasmania.

== Taxonomy ==
In Greek Agastachys refers to the abundant flower spikes and odorata in Latin refers to the pungent odour the flowers produce.

Scottish botanist Robert Brown described Agastachys odorata in 1810. The Agastachys genus only contains the single species. A. odorata has been grouped formally with the Australian genus, Symphionema and New Caledonian genera Beauprea and Beaupreopsis in the subtribe Cenarrheninae. However, Peter H. Weston and Nigel Barker reviewed the suprageneric relationships of the Proteaceae in 2006, using molecular and morphological data. In this scheme Agastachys and Symphionema are sister taxa in a clade, which diverged early from the main lineage, and they are classified in their own subfamily Symphionematoideae.

== Description ==
Agastachys odorata is an erect, evergreen shrub that is endemic to Tasmania. A. odorata can be variable in shape, though mature individuals are commonly found between 1–3 metres (3.3–9.8 ft) in height and 0.5–1 m (1.6–3.3 ft) in width. A. odorata displays many of the diagnostic characteristics of the Proteaceae family it belongs to. The primary protea features it exhibits are leathery alternate leaves and irregular woody floral structures.

The leaves have entire margins with rounded tips. They are bright green in appearance with an almost leathery thick texture. The leaf is narrow-oblong to oblanceolate. The leaves lack hairs.

The peak flowering times are during the early Australian summer months of December and January. The flower spikes look like fluffy white-to-creamy yellow candles, appropriate as one of the common names for A. odorata is fragrant candlebush. The flowers also resemble an erect, lighter coloured version of Tasmanian waratah (Telopea truncata), hence its other common name of white waratah. Masses of white-to-creamy yellow flowers are produced in erect flower spikes. The flower spikes are clustered on the ends of branches. The spikes range in height from 8 to 12 cm, hence can be noticed from a distance as they rise above the canopy of the shrub. They produce a floral odour which some describe as pleasant.

Flowering is followed by the production of an inconspicuous woody winged nut. The morphology of the relatively large wings on the nut assist in seed dispersal by wind (anemochory). The nut is often a brownish colour.

== Distribution and habitat ==
Agastachys odorata is endemic to Tasmania, Australia. It grows in highest abundances in the western and southern regions of Tasmania. A. odorata occurs in a variety of 'wet' vegetation types across Tasmania, most often in heath, scrub, wet sclerophyll/eucalypt forest, temperate rainforest and occasionally in alpine regions. A. odorata prefers areas of high rainfall, hence its limited distribution toward to drier eastern parts of Tasmania.

A. odorata is commonly found on nutrient poor soils. The proteoid roots produced by A. odorata, a feature of the Proteaceae family, increase the nutrient absorption of the plant and help the species to thrive in harsh conditions. The proteoid roots facilitate increased nutrient absorption as the dense clusters of roots increase the surface area for nutrient uptake to occur.

A. odorata may be seen in the Southwest and Franklin-Gordon Wild Rivers National Parks, Tasmania.

== Conservation status ==
Agastachys odorata is listed as 'Least concern' on the IUCN Red List and is not listed on the Tasmanian Threatened Species Protection Act 1995 or the Environment Protection Biodiversity Conservation Act 1999 (EPBC Act) List of Threatened Flora. However, as A. odorata is an underrepresented species in ecological and scientific works on the effects of climate and land-use changes occurring in Tasmania, its security is not ensured into the future. The species is not widely cultivated in gardens, with successful propagation difficult and rare using traditional techniques such as seed germination. Despite the challenges mentioned, seeds have been collected, and are stored at the Tasmanian Seed Conservation Centre.

A. odorata is known to be highly susceptible to Phytophthora cinnamomi dieback. The root-rot fungus puts the species at risk into the future as the disease spreads across Tasmania.

However, organisations such as Australian Native Plant Society rate the overall conservation status of the species as "not considered to be at risk in the wild".

== Gallery ==
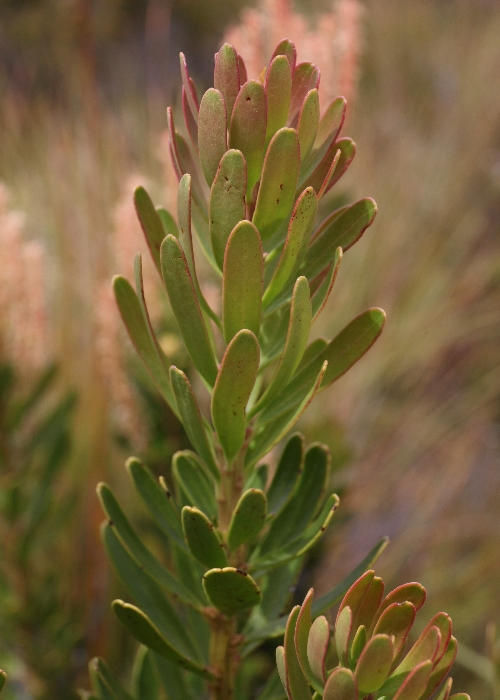
Morphology of Agastachys odorata leaves

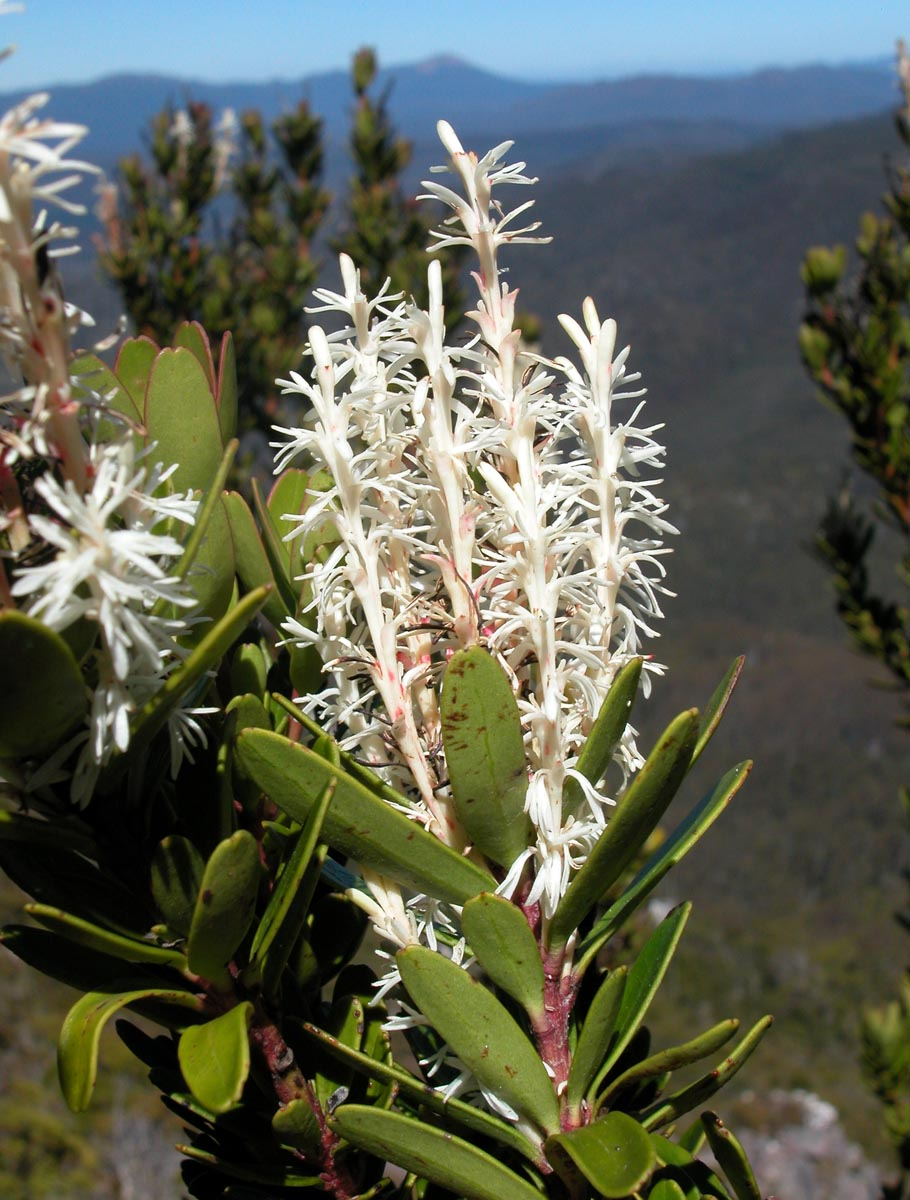
Erect flower spikes

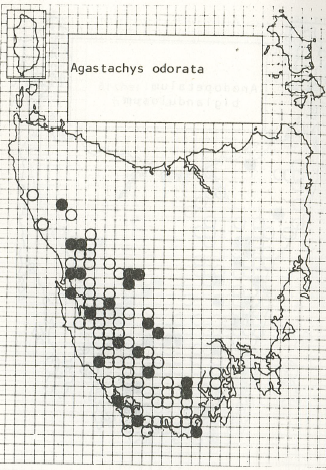
Distribution of A. odorata in Tasmania. Darker dots represent higher concentration of specimens.

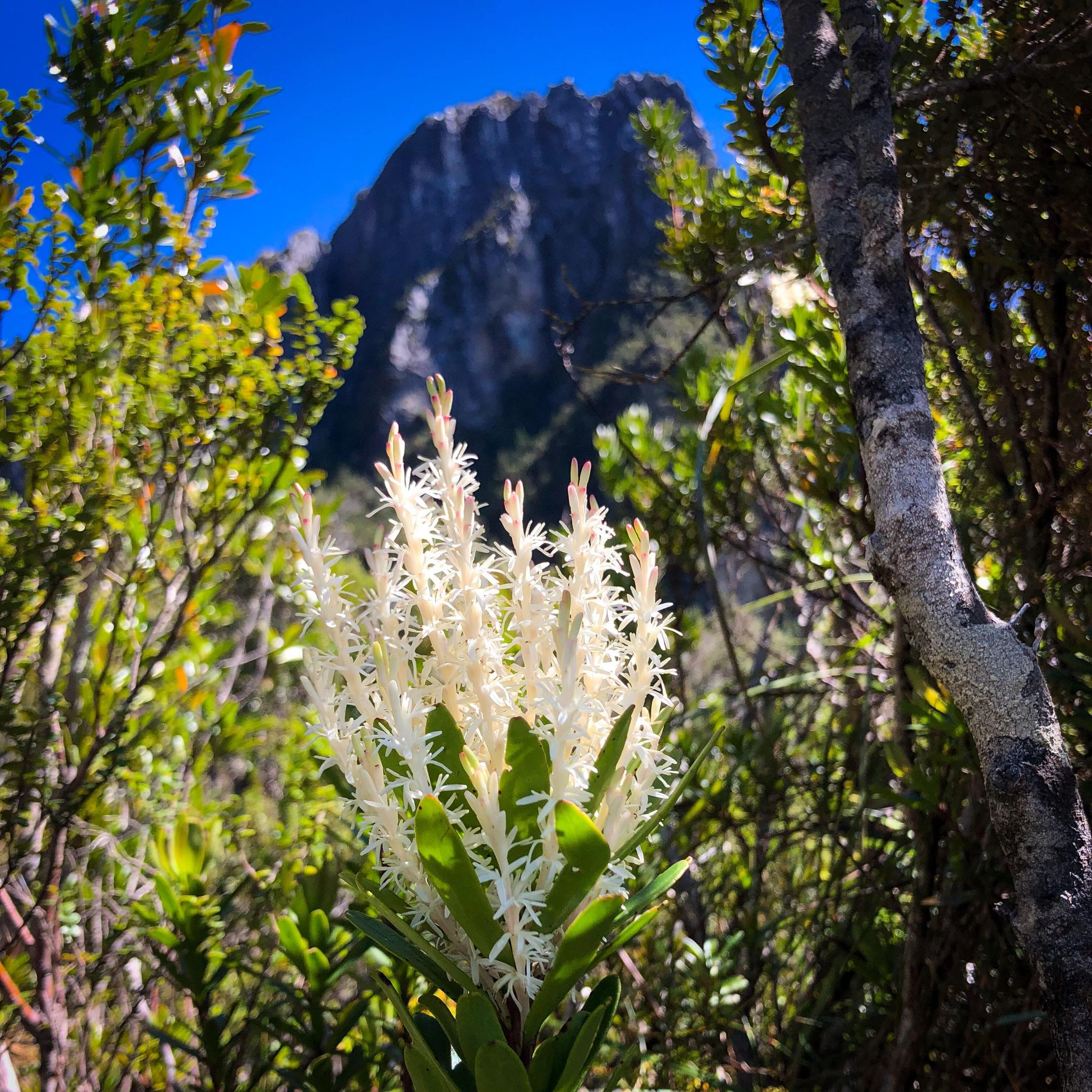
A. odorata in full bloom at Frenchmans Cap, Tasmania
