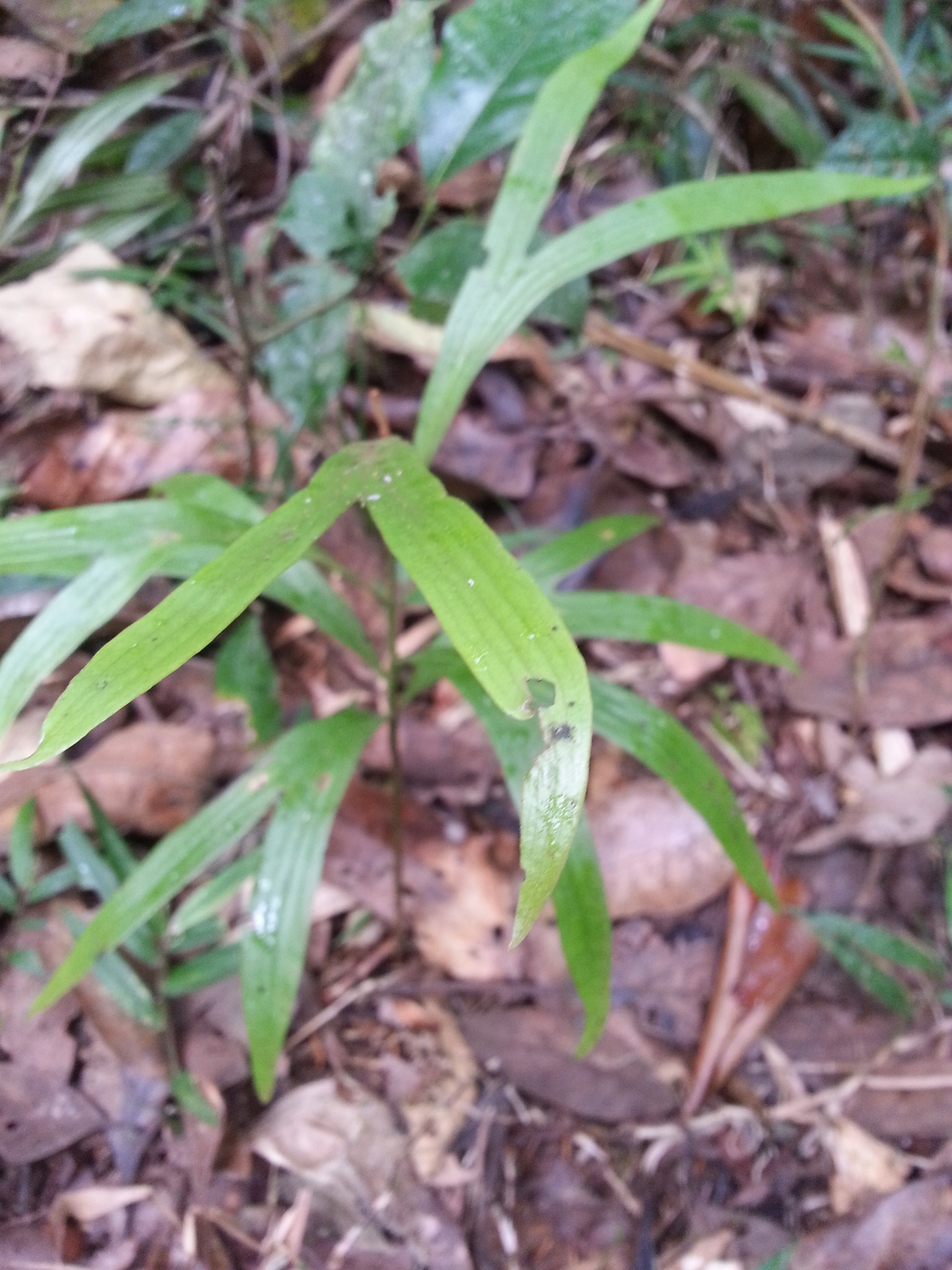
- Dilobeia thouarsii

Scientific classification
- Kingdom: Plantae
- Clade: Embryophytes
- Clade: Tracheophytes
- Clade: Angiosperms
- Clade: Eudicots
- Order: Proteales
- Family: Proteaceae
- Subfamily: Proteoideae
- Genus: Dilobeia; Thouars, 1806

Species
- Dilobeia tenuinervis Bosser & R. Rabev.; Dilobeia thouarsii Roem. & Schult.

= Dilobeia =

Genus of trees

Dilobeia is a genus of trees in the family Proteaceae. It is endemic to Madagascar and contains two recognised species. It is most closely related to the genera Cenarrhenes (Tasmania) and Beaupreopsis (New Caledonia).
