= Dilobeia tenuinervis =

Conservation status
- Endangered (IUCN 3.1)

Scientific classification
- Kingdom: Plantae
- Clade: Embryophytes
- Clade: Tracheophytes
- Clade: Angiosperms
- Clade: Eudicots
- Order: Proteales
- Family: Proteaceae
- Genus: Dilobeia
- Species: D. tenuinervis

Binomial name
- Dilobeia tenuinervis Bosser & R. Rabev., 1991

Species of tree

Dilobeia tenuinervis is a species of tree in the family Proteaceae. It is endemic to Madagascar.

== Range and habitat ==
Dilobeia tenuinervis is a large tree, native to the humid lowland forests of southeastern Madagascar. It is known only from the Tsitongambarika forest in Anosy region, where it grows between 200 and 300 meters (660 and 980 ft) elevation.

The tree is threatened with habitat loss from illegal logging, conversion of forest to agriculture and pasture, and human-caused fires. It is assessed as Endangered.
