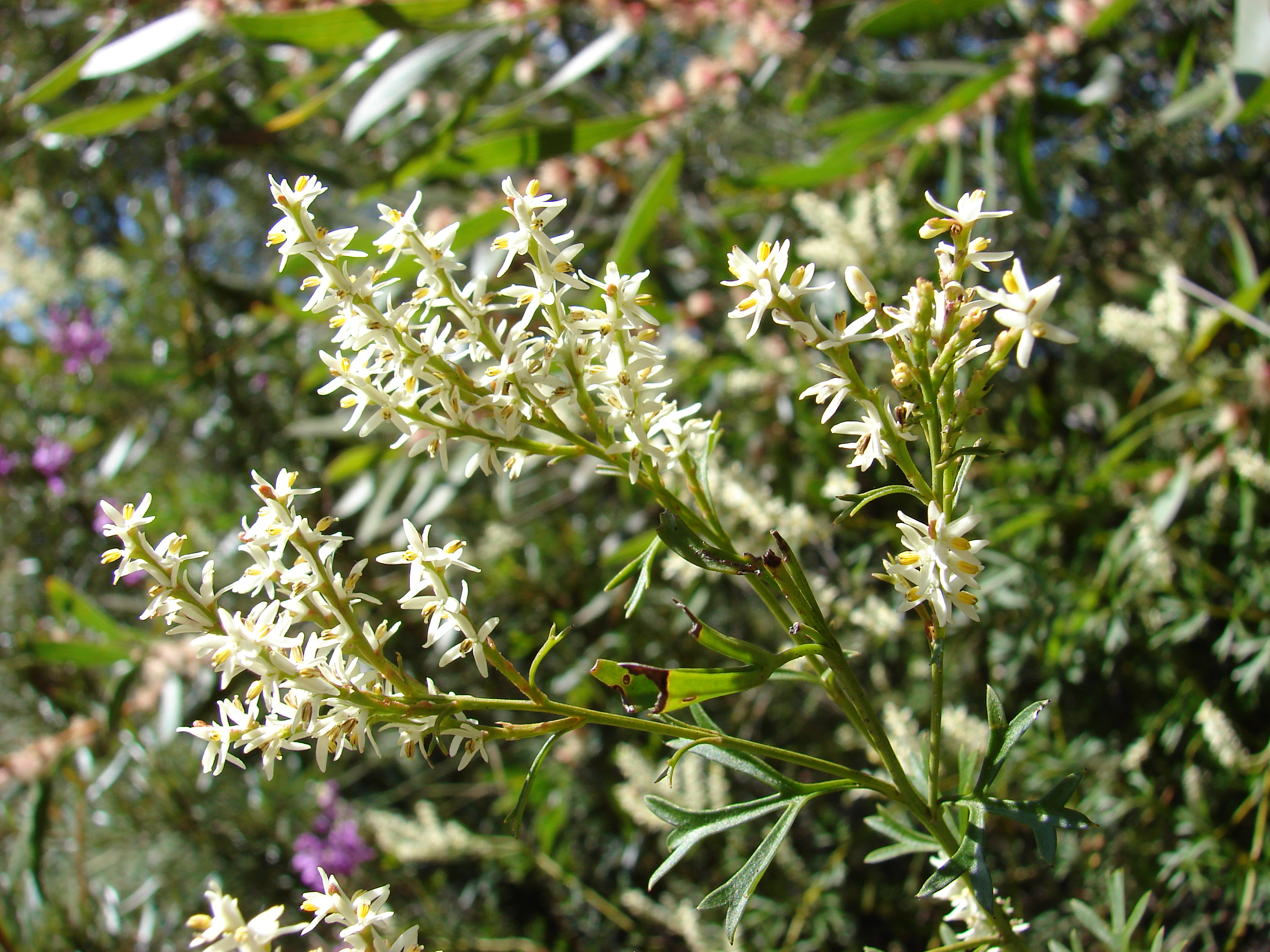

Scientific classification
- Kingdom: Plantae
- Clade: Tracheophytes
- Clade: Angiosperms
- Clade: Eudicots
- Order: Proteales
- Family: Proteaceae
- Genus: Symphionema
- Species: S. montanum

Binomial name
- Symphionema montanum R.Br.
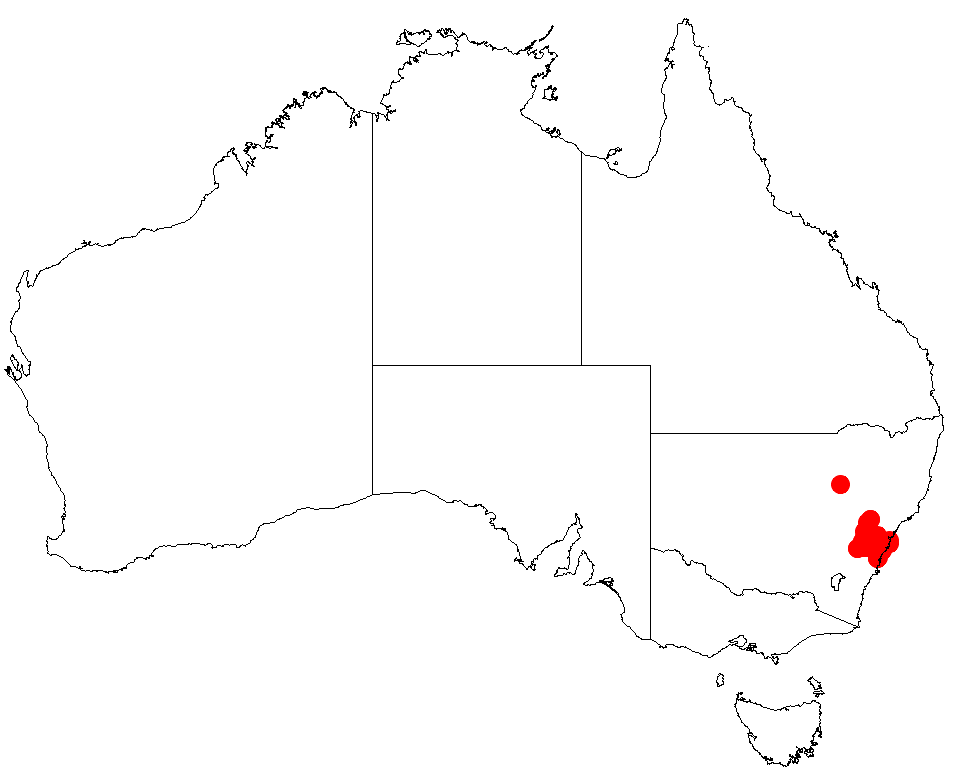
- Occurrence data from Australasian Virtual Herbarium

= Symphionema montanum =

Species of shrub endemic to Australia

Symphionema montanum is a shrub endemic to New South Wales in eastern Australia. It is one of the many species authored by Robert Brown.
