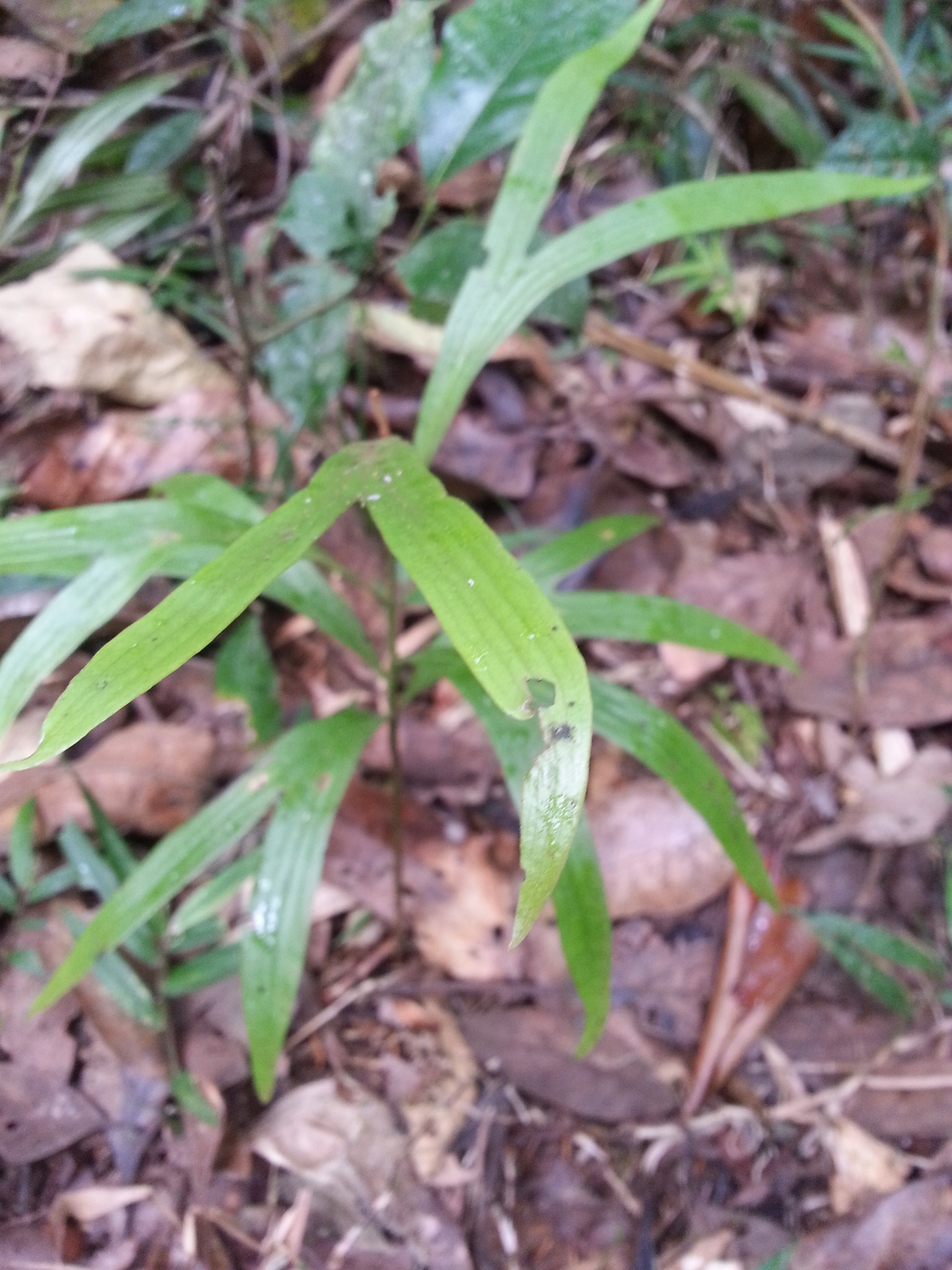

Conservation status
- Least Concern (IUCN 3.1)

Scientific classification
- Kingdom: Plantae
- Clade: Embryophytes
- Clade: Tracheophytes
- Clade: Angiosperms
- Clade: Eudicots
- Order: Proteales
- Family: Proteaceae
- Genus: Dilobeia
- Species: D. thouarsii

Binomial name
- Dilobeia thouarsii Roem. & Schult.

Synonyms
- Dilobeia boiviniana Baill.; Dilobeia madagascariensis Chancerel

= Dilobeia thouarsii =

Species of tree

Dilobeia thouarsii is a species of tree in the family Proteaceae. It is endemic to Madagascar. The specific epithet honours French botanist Louis-Marie Aubert du Petit-Thouars. The leaves are used in traditional Malagasy medicine to treat wounds and bacterial skin infections.

The tree flowers from October to March, and fruits between March and October.

== Range and habitat ==
Dilobeia thouarsii is native to eastern Madagascar, in the provinces of Antananarivo, Antsiranana, Fianarantsoa, Mahajanga, Toamasina and Toliara.

It inhabits humid and subhumid lowland forests and montane forests from sea level up to 1,600 meters (5,200 ft) elevation. It typically grows on lateritic and white sand soils.
