= Kanangra Creek =

Coordinates: 33°57′S 150°09′E

Kanangra Thurat Rivulet (Part), Konangaroo Creek, Kanangra River
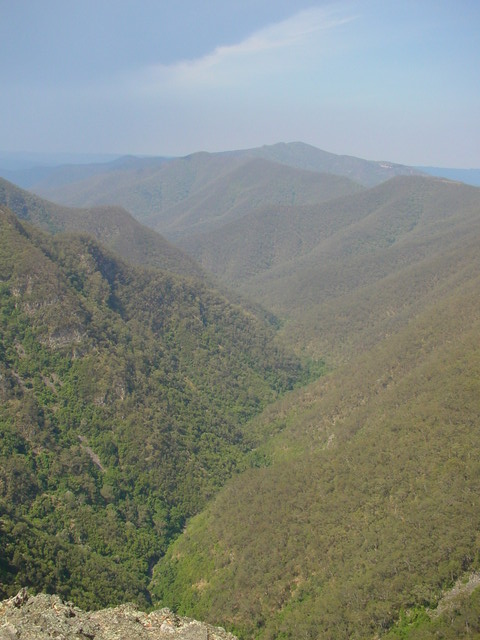

Location
- Country: Australia
- State: New South Wales
- Region: Sydney Basin (IBRA), Blue Mountains
- Municipality: Oberon Shire

Physical characteristics
- Source: Mount Thurat, Boyd Plateau
  - location: near Mount Wallarra, Kanangra-Boyd National Park
  - elevation: 1,110 m (3,640 ft)
- Mouth: confluence with the Coxs River
  - location: Kanangra-Boyd National Park
  - elevation: 157 m (515 ft)
- Length: 20 km (12 mi)

Basin features
- River system: Hawkesbury-Nepean catchment
- Tributaries
  - left: Whalania Creek
- National park: Kanangra-Boyd NP

The Kanangra Creek, a perennial stream of the Hawkesbury-Nepean catchment, is located in the Blue Mountains region of New South Wales, Australia.

== Course ==
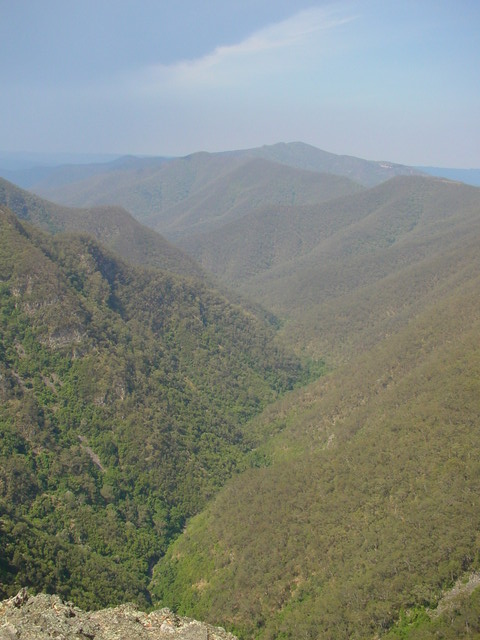
Kanangra Grand Gorge, pictured in 2002.

The Kanangra Creek (officially designated as a river) rises near Mount Wallarra, below the Boyd Plateau on the western slopes of Mount Thurat, and flows generally south-east and north-east through Kanangra Gorge, joined by one minor tributary, before reaching its confluence with the Coxs River at Konangaroo Clearing. The river descends 950 metres (3,120 ft) over its 20-kilometre (12 mi) course. The river is entirely contained within the world heritage-listed Kanangra-Boyd National Park.

The Kanangra Falls, a waterfall located on the river, descends 225 metres (738 ft) in two drops.

=== Kanangra-Boyd Wilderness ===
The Kanangra-Boyd Wilderness is among the largest and most rugged wilderness areas in New South Wales. Situated to the south of Katoomba in the Blue Mountains and the Kanangra-Boyd National Parks, this folded belt or "Rim Rock" area is markedly different from the Permo-Triassic sandstone dominated landforms which comprise the rest of the Blue Mountains. The Kanangra Gorge, along the river floor, is cut 600–900 metres (2,000–3,000 ft) deep in rocks of the Lambie Group, and is one of Australia's deepest gorges.

== See also ==
- List of rivers of Australia
- List of rivers of New South Wales (A–K)
- Rivers of New South Wales
