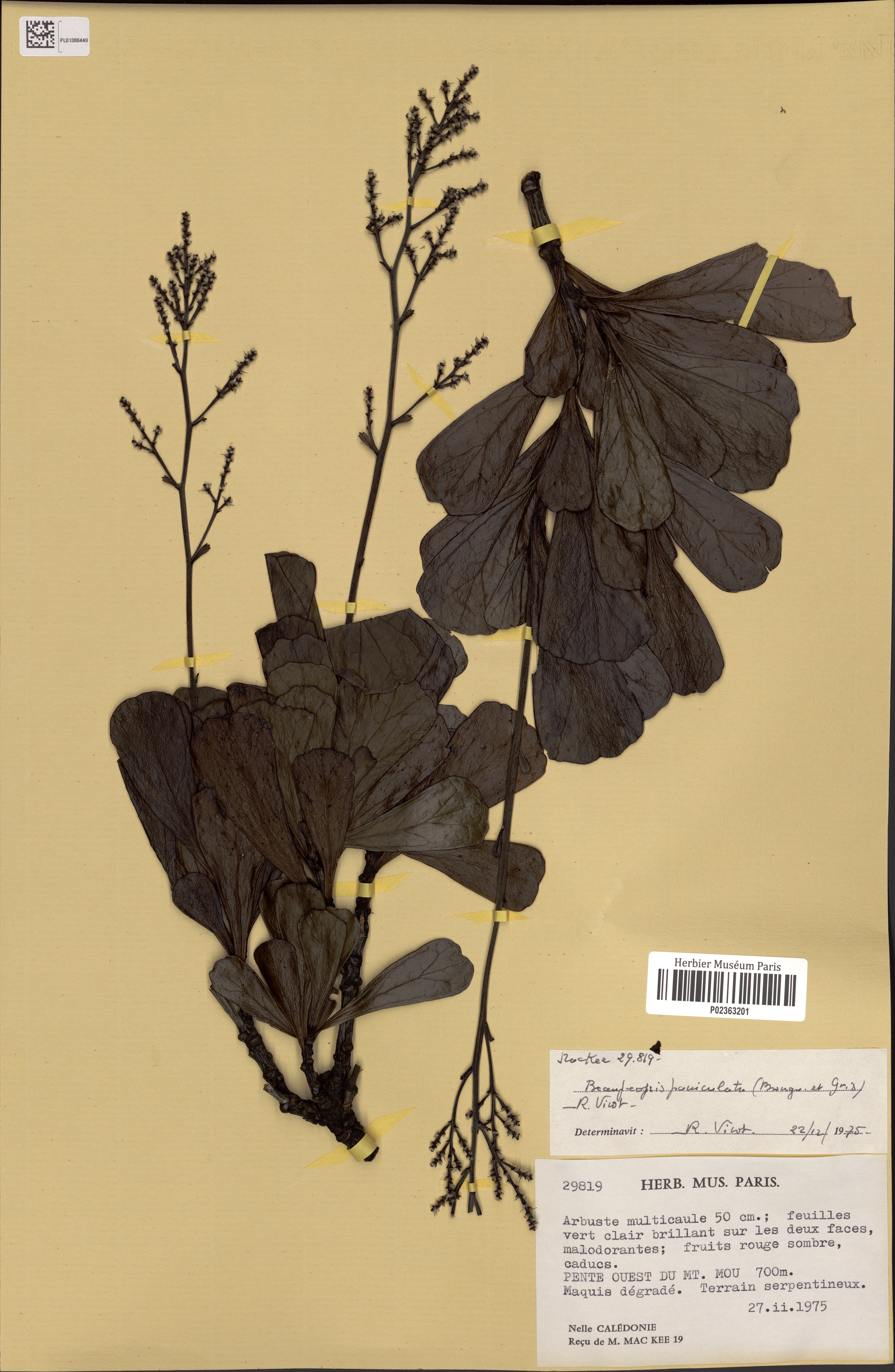

Conservation status
- Least Concern (IUCN 3.1)

Scientific classification
- Kingdom: Plantae
- Clade: Embryophytes
- Clade: Tracheophytes
- Clade: Angiosperms
- Clade: Eudicots
- Order: Proteales
- Family: Proteaceae
- Subfamily: Proteoideae
- Genus: Beaupreopsis; Virot
- Species: B. paniculata

Binomial name
- Beaupreopsis paniculata (Brongn. & Gris) Virot

= Beaupreopsis =

Monotypic genus of plants

Beaupreopsis is a genus of flowering plants in the family Proteaceae, with just one species in the genus, Beaupreopsis paniculata. It is native to New Caledonia on the south of Grand Terre. Its habitat is shrubland at altitudes from 30 to 1,580 m (98 to 5,184 ft), on substrates of eroded ultramafic rocks.

== Description ==
The plants are shrubs, rarely exceeding 1.50 m (4 ft 11 in) in height, with thick branches, scattered and few. They have pseudo-whorled leaves (5-10 x 0, 20-0, 60 cm), more or less toothed or lobed at the apex, cuneate at the base, leathery, venation slightly prominent, petiole short and robust.

Flowers are small, white or pinkish in terminal panicles from 20 to 50 cm. The fruits are small and hairy, containing a single seed.

== Taxonomy ==
This plant was first described as Cenarrhenes paniculata in 1865 by French botanists Adolphe-Théodore Brongniart and Jean Antoine Arthur Gris, and published in Bulletin de la Société Botanique de France. In 1968 the species was reviewed by another French botanist, Robert Virot, who created the new genus Beaupreopsis and transferred the species to it. His work was published in Flore de la Nouvelle-Calédonie et Dépendances.

The genus Beaupreopsis is most closely related to the genera Cenarrhenes (Tasmania) and Dilobeia (Madagascar).
