= Acacia dorothea =

Scientific classification
- Kingdom: Plantae
- Clade: Tracheophytes
- Clade: Angiosperms
- Clade: Eudicots
- Clade: Rosids
- Order: Fabales
- Family: Fabaceae
- Subfamily: Caesalpinioideae
- Clade: Mimosoid clade
- Genus: Acacia
- Species: A. dorothea

Binomial name
- Acacia dorothea Maiden
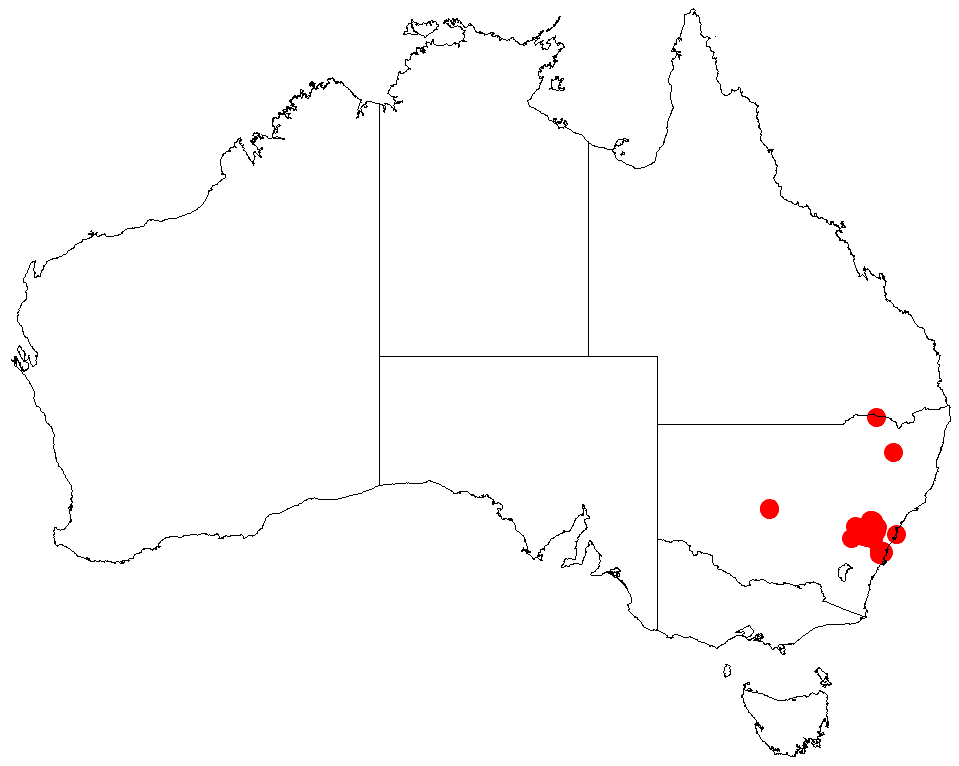
- Occurrence data from AVH

Synonyms
- Racosperma dorothea (Maiden) Pedley; Racosperma dorotheae Pedley orth. var.

Species of legume

Acacia dorothea, commonly known as Dorothy's wattle, is a species of flowering plant in the family Fabaceae and is endemic to New South Wales. It is a shrub with hairy branchlets, ascending to erect, narrowly erect phyllodes, oblong to short cylindrical heads of bright golden yellow flowers and narrowly oblong pods with silvery white hairs.

== Description ==
Acacia dorothea is a shrub that typically grows to a height of 1–2 m (3–7 ft), often forms suckers and has branchlets covered with fine, white hairs pressed against the surface. Its phyllodes are ascending to erect, narrowly elliptic to lance-shaped with the narrower end towards the base, 50–80 mm (2.0–3.1 in) long and 8–16 mm (0.31–0.63 in) wide with a prominent midrib and a rather prominent gland usually 10–35 mm (0.39–1.38 in) above the base of the phyllode. The flowers are borne in oblong or shortly cylindrical heads in racemes 20–35 mm (0.79–1.38 in) long, the heads on peduncles 1.5–2.5 mm (0.059–0.098 in) long with 20 to 25 bright golden yellow flowers. Flowering occurs from August to October, and the pods are narrowly oblong, thinly leathery, straight to slightly curved, up to 50 mm (2.0 in) long, about 7 mm (0.28 in) wide and covered with more or less silky, silvery white hair.

== Taxonomy ==
Acacia dorothea was first formally described in 1901 by Joseph Maiden in the journal Proceedings of the Linnean Society of New South Wales. The specific epithet (dorothea) honours Maiden's daughter "Acacia Dorothy Maiden, (in fulfillment of a long-standing promise)".

== Distribution and habitat ==
Dorothy's wattle grows in sand or loam over sandstone, in Eucalyptus forest, woodland or scrub on plateaus, ridge tops and in steep gullies, from the Newnes district to near Robertson.

== See also ==
- List of Acacia species
