= Kanangra Falls =

- Location within New South Wales
- Location: Kanangra-Boyd National Park, near Oberon, New South Wales, Australia
- Coordinates: 33°58′50″S 150°06′06″E
- Total height: 225 m (738 ft)
- Number of drops: 2
- Watercourse: Kanangra River

Kanangra Falls is a waterfall on the Kanangra River, in the Kanangra-Boyd National Park, near Oberon, in the Central Tablelands of New South Wales, Australia. The waterfall is located at Thurat Walls about 800 metres (2,600 ft) northeast of Ianthe Hill, with the fall height reported in 1930 as being 225 metres (738 feet) in two sections.

Kanangra Falls is popular with canyoning and abseiling groups.

== See also ==
- List of waterfalls
- List of waterfalls in Australia
