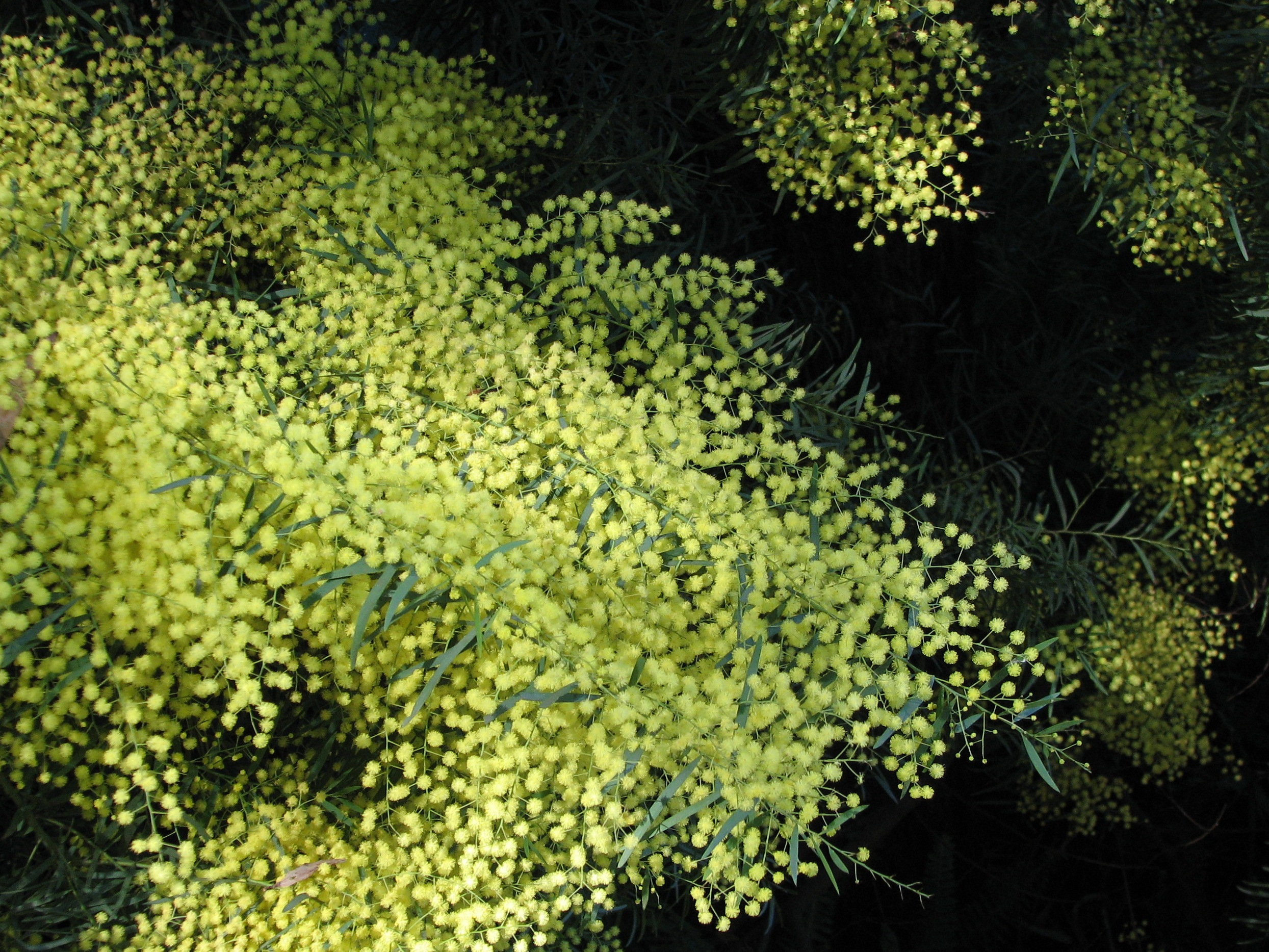

Scientific classification
- Kingdom: Plantae
- Clade: Tracheophytes
- Clade: Angiosperms
- Clade: Eudicots
- Clade: Rosids
- Order: Fabales
- Family: Fabaceae
- Subfamily: Caesalpinioideae
- Clade: Mimosoid clade
- Genus: Acacia
- Species: A. caesiella

Binomial name
- Acacia caesiella Maiden & Blakely
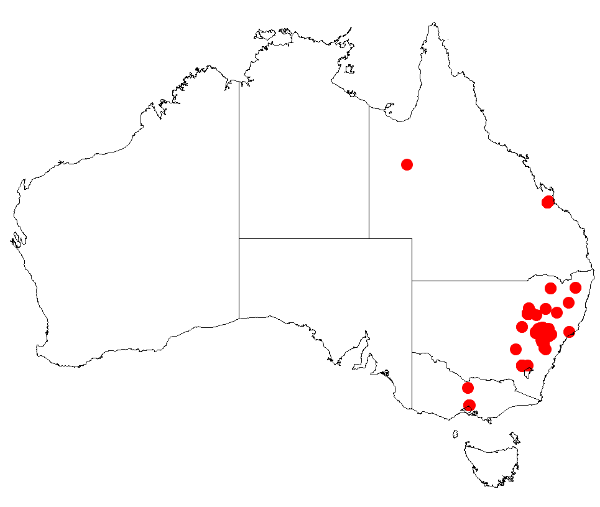
- Occurrence data from AVH

Synonyms
- Racosperma caesiellum (Maiden & Blakely) Pedley

= Acacia caesiella =

Tableland wattle

Species of legume

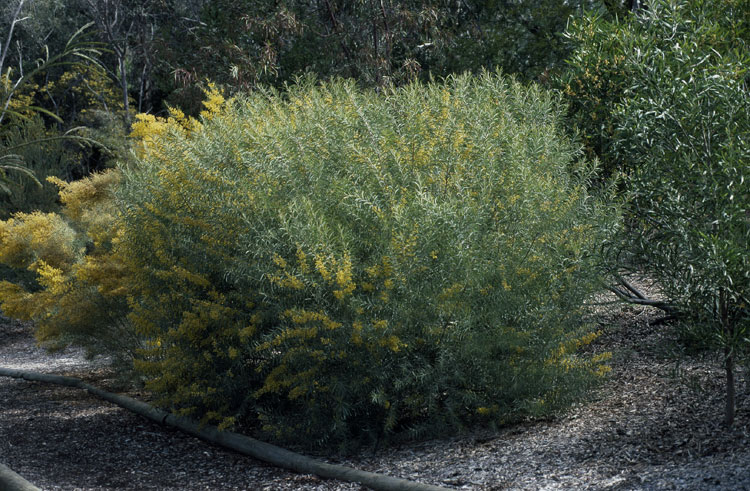
Habit in the ANBG

Acacia caesiella, commonly known as tableland wattle, bluebush wattle or blue bush, is a species of flowering plant in the family Fabaceae and is endemic to New South Wales, Australia. It is an erect or spreading shrub, sometimes a small tree with smooth bark, narrowly elliptic to linear phyllodes, spherical heads of yellow, bright yellow or deep yellow flowers, and straight to slightly curved, firmly papery to thinly leathery, glabrous pods.

== Description ==
Acacia caesiella is an erect or spreading shrub that typically grows to a height of 1–3.5 m (3 ft 3 in – 11 ft 6 in), sometimes a tree to 5 m (16 ft) with smooth grey or brown bark. Its phyllodes are narrowly elliptic to linear, 40–100 mm (1.6–3.9 in) long and 3–7 mm (0.12–0.28 in) wide and more or less straight or curved. The flowers are arranged in 4 to 14 spherical heads in racemes on peduncles 2–4 mm (0.079–0.157 in) long. Each head has 12 to 20 yellow, bright yellow or deep yellow flowers. Flowering occurs between July and October, and the pods are straight to slightly curved, firmly papery to thinly leathery, straight to slightly curved, 40–90 mm (1.6–3.5 in) long and 7–10 mm (0.28–0.39 in) wide containing more or less oblong, slightly shiny black seeds 5–6 mm (0.20–0.24 in) long.

== Taxonomy ==
Acacia caesiella was first formally described by the botanists Joseph Maiden and William Blakely in 1927 in the Journal and Proceedings of the Royal Society of New South Wales from specimens collected by John Luke Boorman near Capertee in 1915.

== Distribution and naming ==
This species of wattle is found in sand over sandstone in forest or open woodland, often in rocky places, mostly on the western slopes of the Great Dividing Range between the Warrumbungle Range, Baradine, Lithgow and near Burrinjuck in New South Wales.

== See also ==
- List of Acacia species
