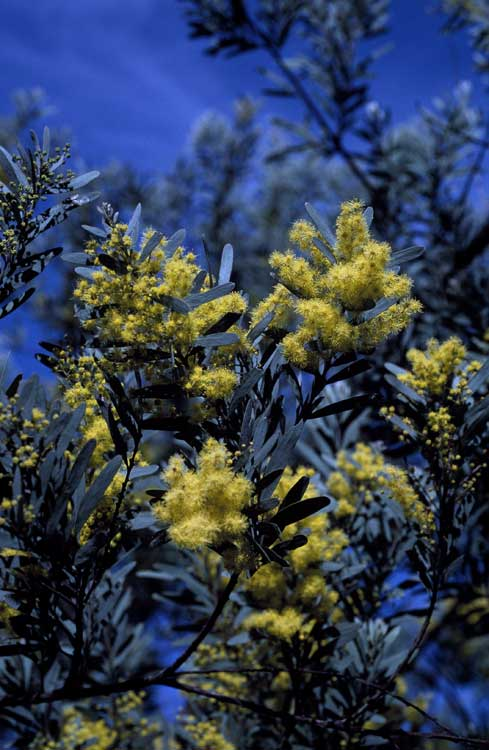

Conservation status
- Vulnerable (NSWBCA)

Scientific classification
- Kingdom: Plantae
- Clade: Tracheophytes
- Clade: Angiosperms
- Clade: Eudicots
- Clade: Rosids
- Order: Fabales
- Family: Fabaceae
- Subfamily: Caesalpinioideae
- Clade: Mimosoid clade
- Genus: Acacia
- Species: A. clunies-rossiae

Binomial name
- Acacia clunies-rossiae Maiden

Synonyms
- Racosperma clunies-rossiae (Maiden) Pedley

= Acacia clunies-rossiae =

Kowmung wattle

Species of legume

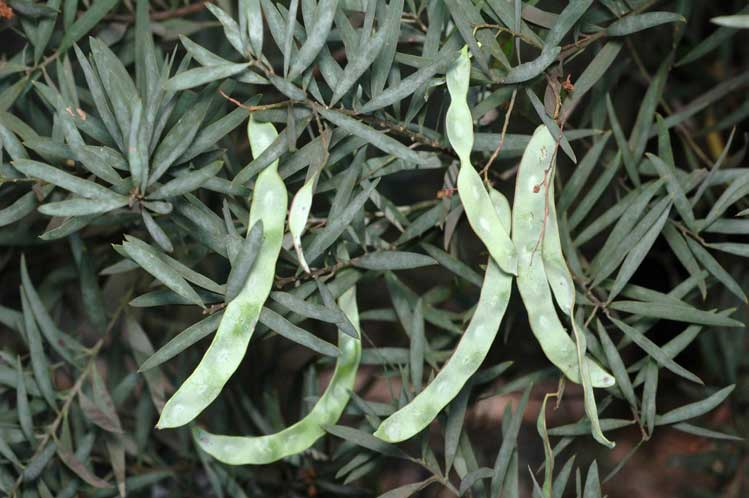
Pods in the Mount Annan Botanic Garden

Acacia clunies-rossiae, commonly known as kowmung wattle or kanangra wattle, is a species of flowering plant in the family Fabaceae and is endemic to a small area of New South Wales, Australia. It is a bushy shrub or tree with narrowly oblong to lance-shaped phyllodes, spherical heads of bright, light golden flowers and firmly papery, glabrous pods raised over the seeds.

== Description ==
Acacia clunies-rossiae is a bushy shrub or tree that typically grows to a height of 2–6 m (6 ft 7 in – 19 ft 8 in) and often has branchlets covered with a white, powdery bloom and straight hairs pressed against the surface. Its phyllodes are thin, narrowly oblong to lance-shaped with the narrower end towards the base, mostly 35–65 mm (1.4–2.6 in) long, 4–10 mm (0.16–0.39 in) wide and glaucous with a gland 2–7 mm (0.079–0.276 in) above the base of the phyllodes. The flowers are borne in spherical heads in a raceme 15–50 mm (0.59–1.97 in) long on peduncles 2–4 mm (0.079–0.157 in) long, each head with 7 to 9 bright, light golden flowers. Flowering mainly occurs in August and September, and the pods are firmly papery, glabrous, up to 60 mm (2.4 in) long, 7–10 mm (0.28–0.39 in) wide, raised over the seeds and covered with a powdery bloom. The seeds are oblong to slightly egg-shaped, 5.5–6.0 mm (0.22–0.24 in) long with a club-shaped aril.

== Taxonomy ==
Acacia clunies-rossiae was first formally described in 1916 by the botanist Joseph Maiden in the Journal and Proceedings of the Royal Society of New South Wales from specimens collected by Richard Hind Cambage. The specific epithet (clunies-rossiae) honours "Mrs. Elizabeth Clunies-Ross who, with Mrs. Kettlewell and myself, founded the Australian Wattle Day League in 1909" and "also her late husband an esteemed member of this Society for many years".

== Distribution and habitat ==
Kowmung wattle is restricted to the valleys of the Kowmung River and nearby Coxs River in the Blue Mountains of New South Wales, where it forms part of dry sclerophyll forest communities and is found on rocky slopes of slate or shale, or in alluvium along watercourses.

== Conservation status ==
Acacia clunies-rossiae is listed as "vulnerable" under the New South Wales Government Biodiversity Conservation Act 2016.

== See also ==
- List of Acacia species
