= Kanangra-Boyd National Park =

National park in Australia

- IUCN category Ib (wilderness area)
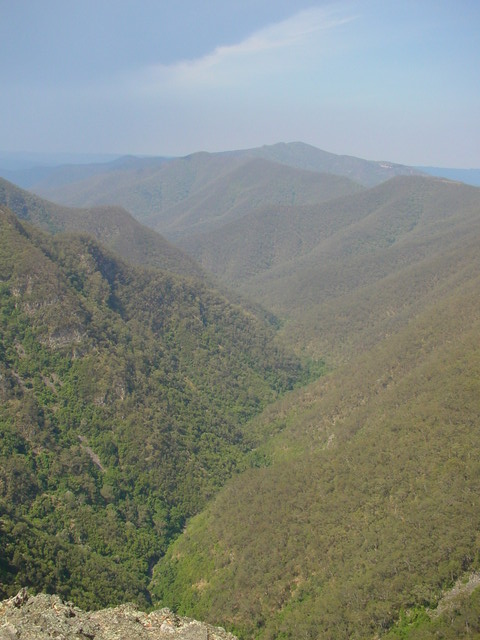
- Kanangra Grand Gorge

- Location within New South Wales
- Location: New South Wales
- Nearest city: Oberon
- Coordinates: 33°56′16″S 150°05′27″E
- Area: 686.6 km^{2} (265.1 sq mi)
- Established: 3 December 1969
- Governing body: NSW National Parks & Wildlife Service
- Website: Official website

The Kanangra-Boyd National Park is a protected national park in the Central Tablelands region, west of the Southern Highlands and Macarthur regions, in New South Wales, in eastern Australia. The 68,660-hectare (169,700-acre) national park is situated approximately 180 kilometres (110 mi) south-west of Sydney and is contiguous with the Blue Mountains National Park and the Nattai National Park. The park was established in 1969.

The Kanangra-Boyd National Park is one of the eight protected areas that, in 2000, was inscribed to form part of the UNESCO World Heritage–listed Greater Blue Mountains Area. The Kanangra-Boyd National Park is the most south–westerly of the eight protected areas within the World Heritage Site. The national park forms part of the Great Dividing Range.

Notable features of the national park include the Thurat Spires, Kanangra Walls, Mount Colong, and three waterfall systems – the Kalang, the 225-metre (738 ft) two–tiered drop Kanangara and the Morong falls. The park also features a series of karst landforms that can be explored by those with caving experience.

The movie Jedda was filmed in the Kanangra Walls area in 1954.

== Features and location ==
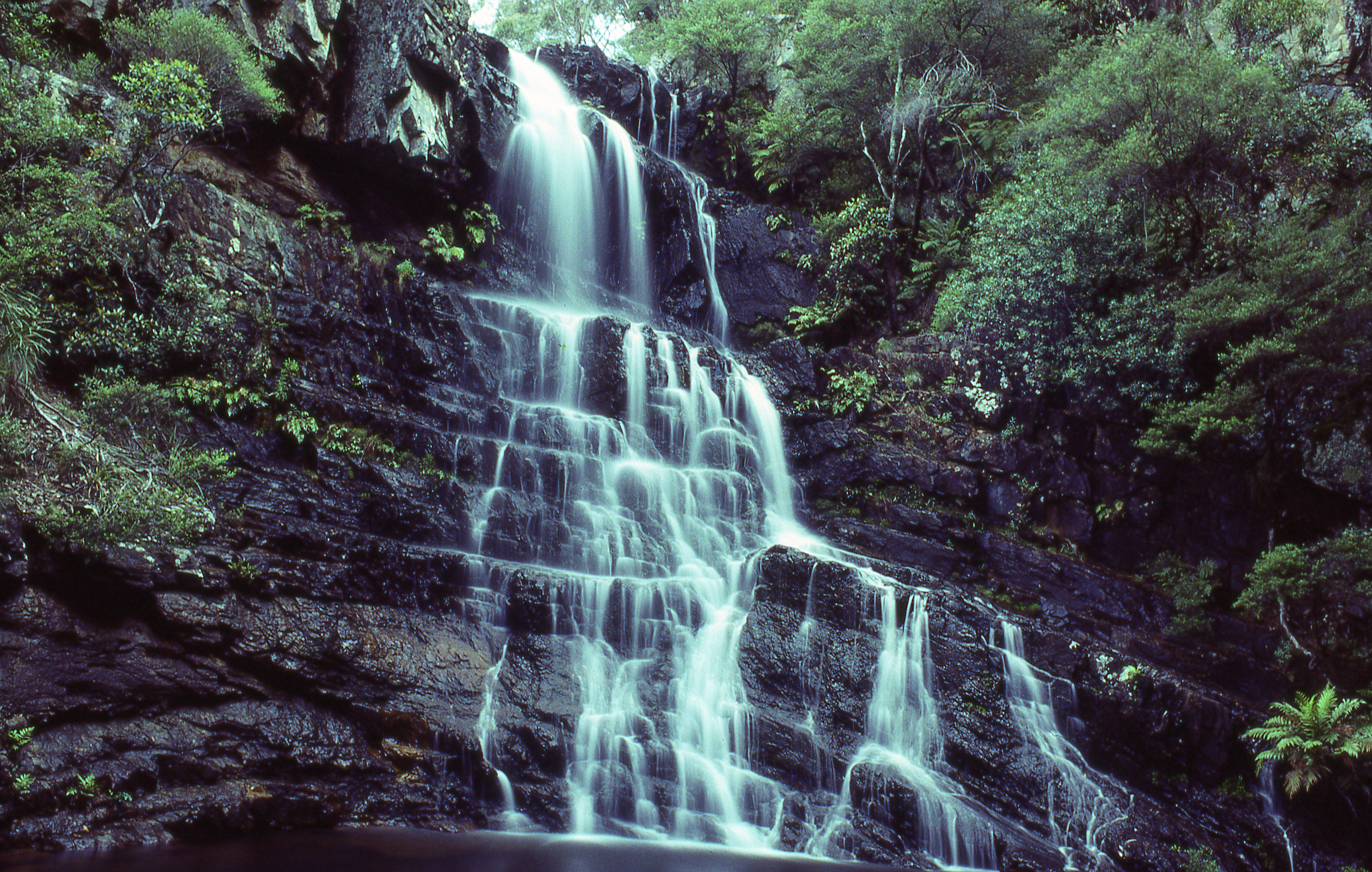
Kalang Falls.

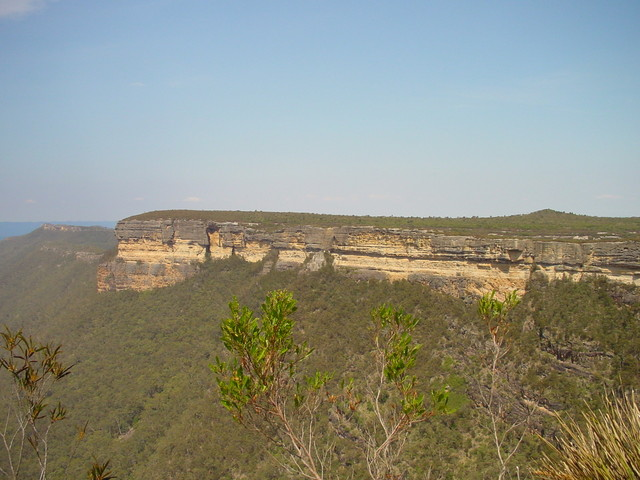
Kanangra Walls seen from Echo Head.

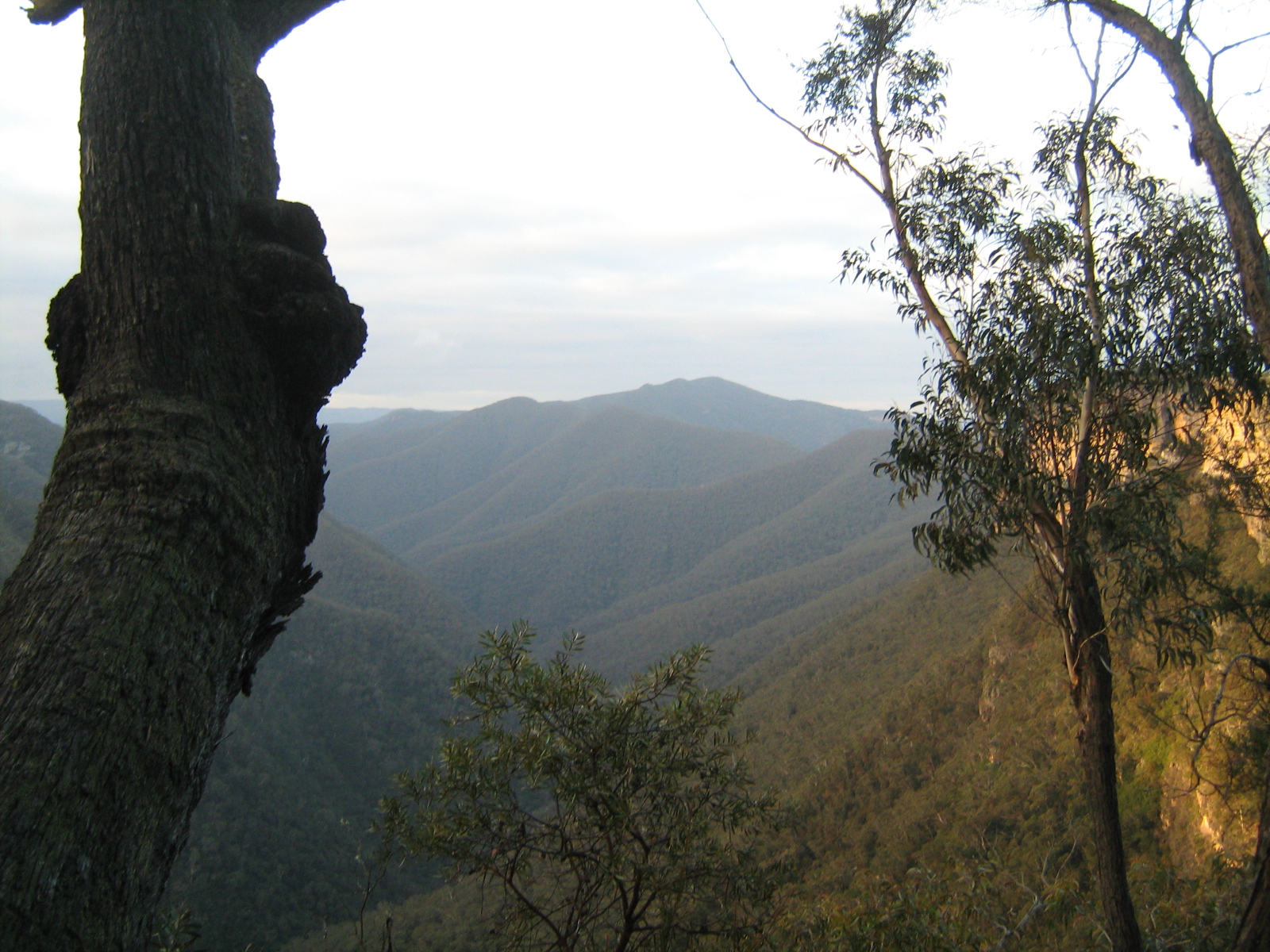
Mount Cloudmaker.

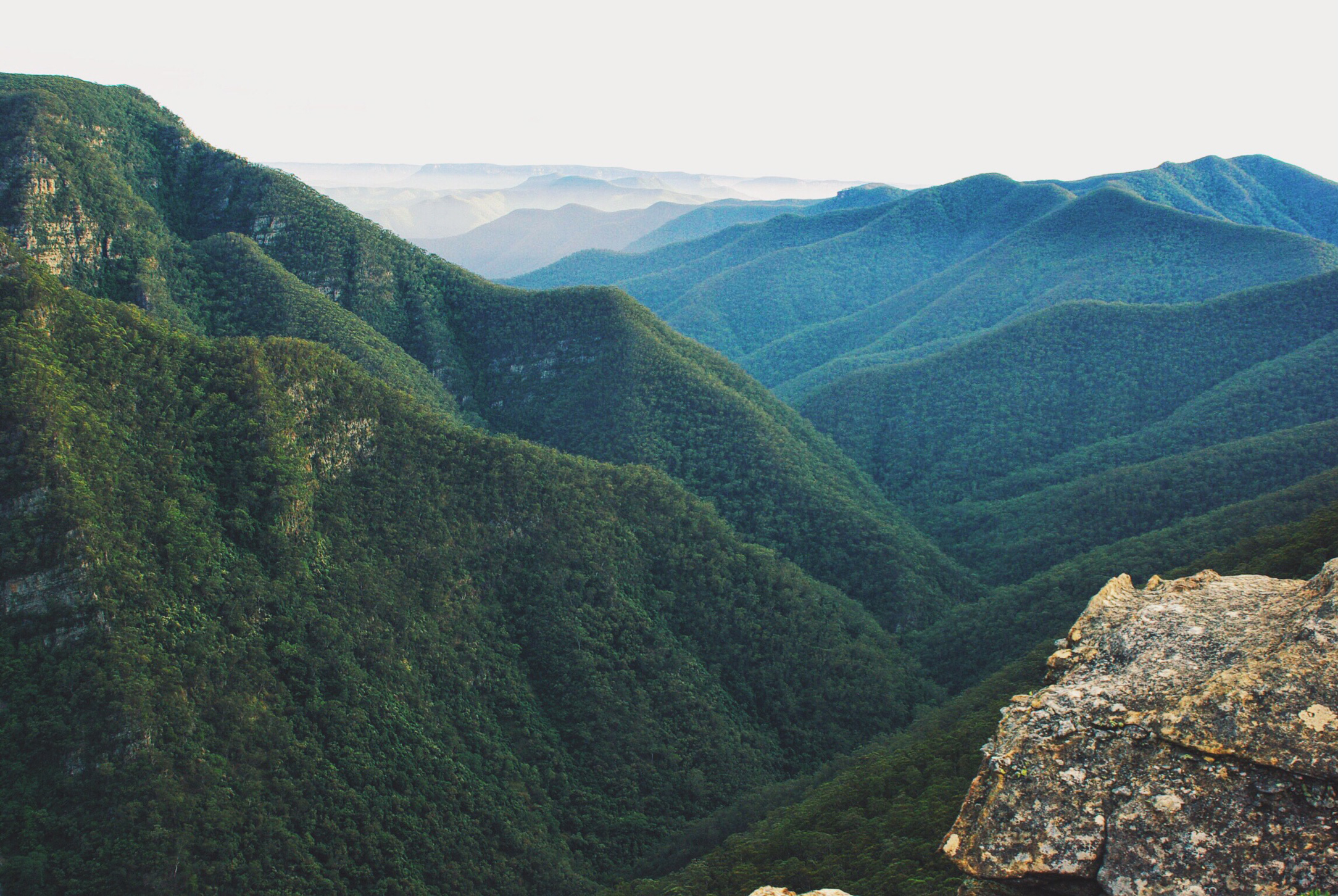
The mountains seen from The Plateau Walk

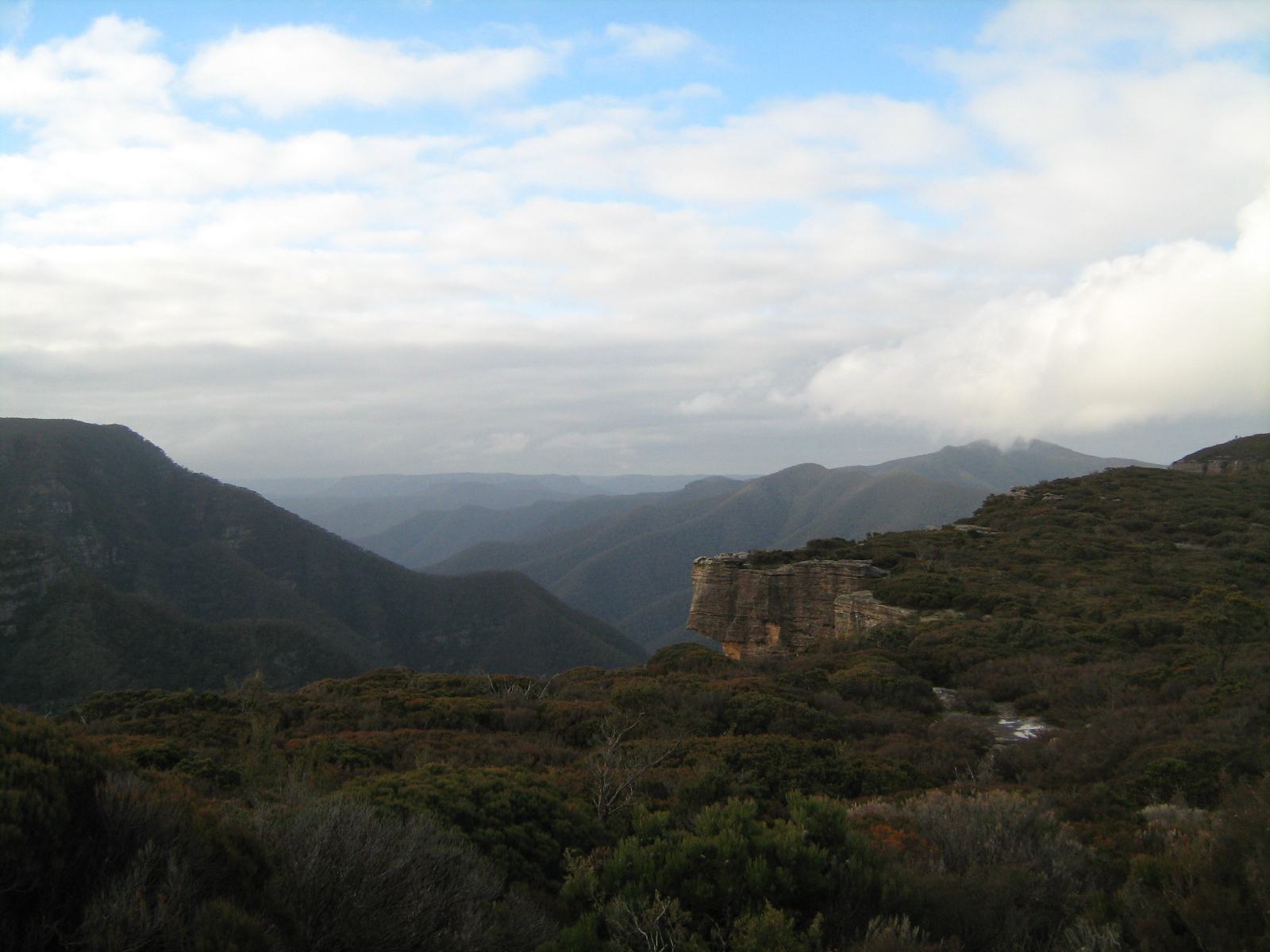
View from Kanangra Walls.

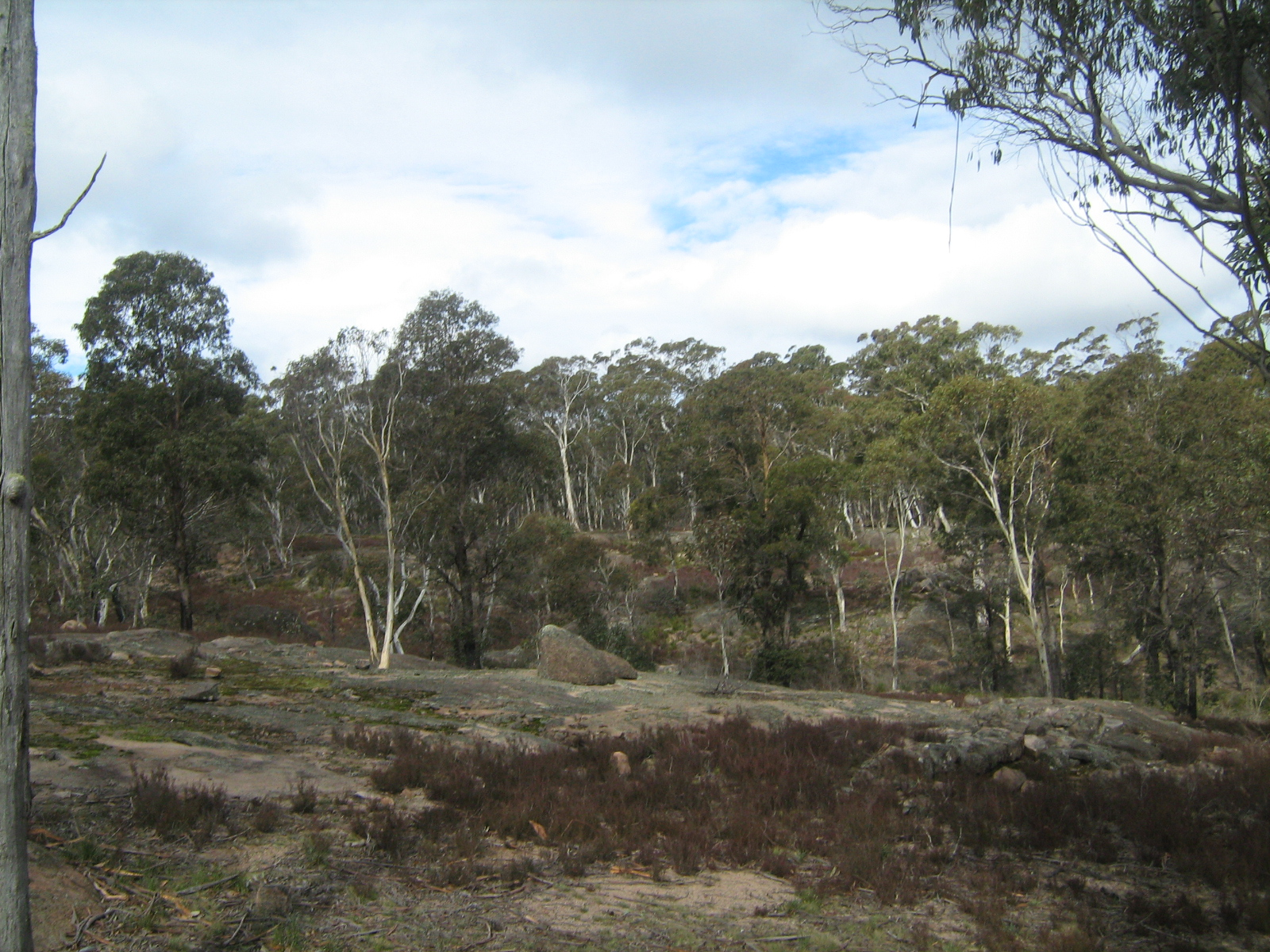
Forest near Morong Creek.

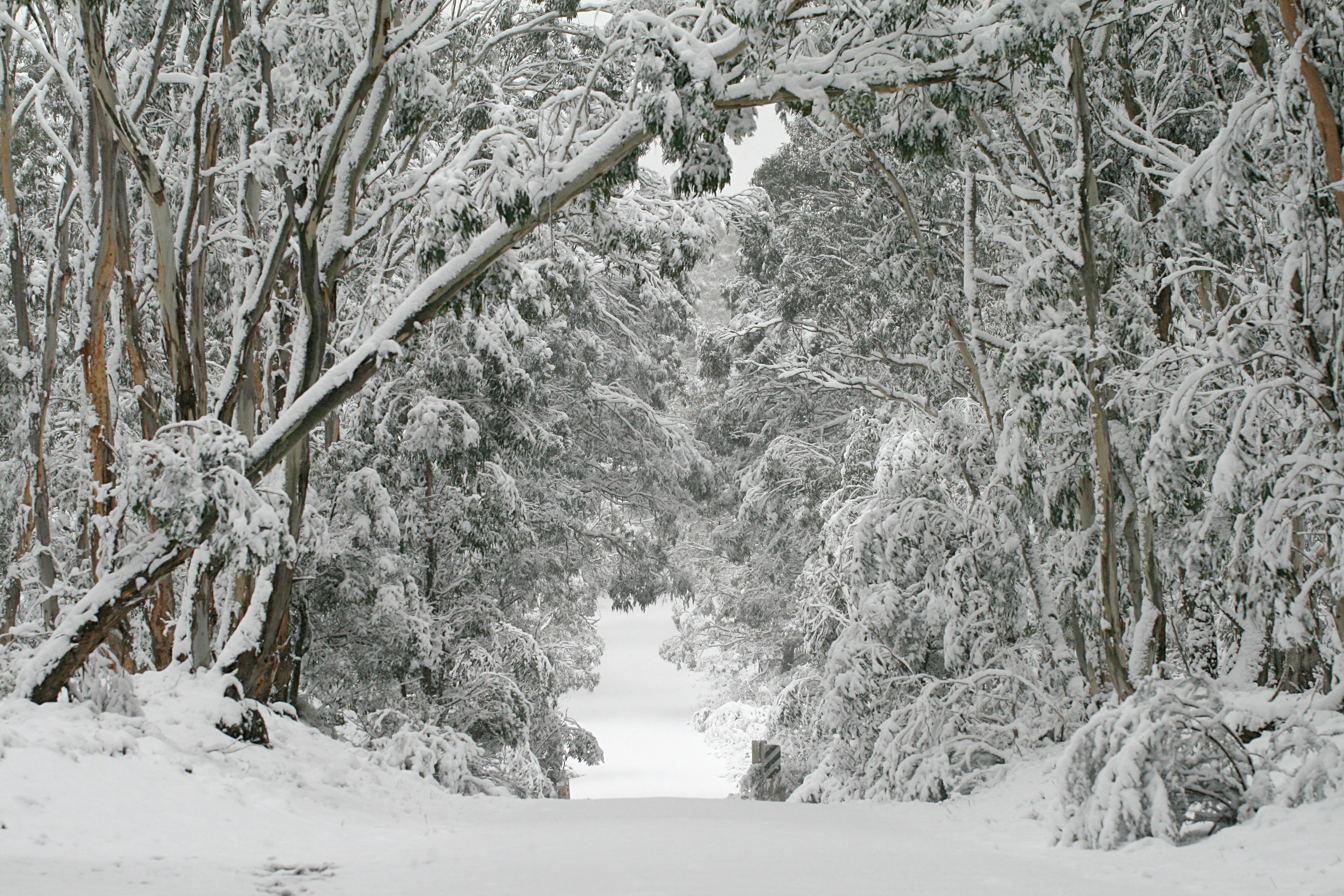
A rare cover of snow, Morong Creek campground. The highest peaks have up to five snowfalls a year, but usually just as snow flurries. Visitors should be prepared for cold weather, particularly in the cooler months.

Kanangra-Boyd National Park is composed of two land units — the elevated, gently undulating Boyd Plateau and the area of creeks, rivers, gorges and ridges into which the plateau falls away. The plateau is traversed by the Kanangra Walls Road and can be accessed either from Oberon or Jenolan Caves. The road leads to Kanangra Walls. There are several well known landmarks in the park, such as Mount Cloudmaker, Kanangra Walls and the Thurat Spires. The word Kanangra is generally held to be a corruption of Gundangura and was called Thurat for some time.

The national park is bounded to the north by open farmland; to the east by the Coxs River, the Blue Mountains National Park and the Kowmung River; to the south–east by the Yerranderie State Conservation Area; to the south by the Nattai National Park and the Wombeyan Caves Road; to the south–west by the Blue Mountains National Park; and to the west by the Kowmung River, the Jenolan Karst Conservation Reserve, and open farmland and extensive state forests that surround the town of Oberon. The Abercrombie River National Park is situated a short distance, further south–west.

=== Geology ===
The Kanangra-Boyd Wilderness is among the largest and most rugged wilderness areas in New South Wales. Situated to the south of Katoomba in the Blue Mountains and the Kanangra-Boyd National Parks, this folded belt or "Rim Rock" area is markedly different from the Permo-Triassic sandstone dominated landforms which comprise the rest of the Blue Mountains. There are isolated residual cappings of Permian sandstone in a few places but here the Palaeozoic basement rocks, which are elsewhere buried well below the Permo-Triassic Measures, are on the surface as high land. Rock types include quartzite, diorite, Devonian rhyolites, rhyo-dacites, Silurian phyllites, slates, siltstones and tuff limestones. The Boyd Plateau comprises a dome of Devonian granite intruded into Devonian quartzites and sedimentaries. There are also intrusive igneous rocks from the Carboniferous period. Kanangra Tops at the south-eastern end of the Plateau is one of the Permian outliers. Its fringing fault scarp – Kanangra Walls – comprises Permian sedimentaries of the Capertee Group which rests unconformably on a Devonian Lambie Group Basement. Nearby Kanangra Gorge is cut 600–900 metres (2,000–3,000 ft) deep in rocks of the Lambie Group, and is one of Australia's deepest gorges. Cloudmaker and Guouogang are eroded remnants of Ordovician quartzite. Further east, in the Coxs River area, is the large Kanimbla granite batholith, emplaced during the Carboniferous period. Colong Caves is another outstanding feature of the area. The main Upper Silurian limestone belt, in the Jenolan River valley to the north-west, is 300 metres (980 ft) thick, 8 kilometres (5.0 mi) long and located in a valley 460 metres (1,510 ft) deep. This karst topography, created by the Jenolan and its tributaries, is one of the least understood in Australia.

=== Flora ===
The complex geology, climate, fire regime, and topography has enabled a wide variety of ecosystems to develop. Eucalypt forest with western plain species, such as yellow box and white box, are found in areas of rainshadow. Forests of mountain ash are found on well drained soils and Blaxland's stringybark where soil is poor. red spotted gum, Blakely's red gum, red stringybark and forest oak are also found. Kurrajong trees are found in abundance where limestone outcrops occur, and in sheltered gullies rainforest species (including red cedar) and blue gum are found. On the Boyd Plateau, the misty mountain forests of brown barrel, messmate, ribbon gum, black sally, snow gum and mallee predominate. High altitude areas subject to strong winds generally support heath and closed scrub communities. In areas of impeded drainage, various swamps occur, dominated by sedges and scrubs such as Leptospermum and Baeckea species.

About 1,000 flowering plant species occur in the Blue Mountains, in some 40 plant communities. There are over 45 rare or endangered plant species in the wilderness. A unique form of tall open forest occurs in the Kedumba Valley, dominated by Camden white gum, an endangered species limited to these populations.

=== Fauna ===
The Blue Mountains National Park contains 46 species of mammals, including 27 marsupials and two monotremes. Over 200 birds and 98 reptile species have been recorded. Several species listed on Schedules 1 and 2 of the Threatened Species Conservation Act 1995 (NSW) are found in the Wilderness Area including: The powerful owl (Ninox strenua), squirrel glider (Petaurus norfolcensis), yellow-bellied glider (Petaurus volans), tiger quoll (Dasyurus maculatus), and brush-tailed rock wallaby (Petrogale penicillata). A species of velvet worm (Euperipatoides kanangrensis) has been found on the Boyd Plateau.

== Bushwalking ==
There are several walking tracks and other sites in the park, these include the:

- Lookout Walk – the easiest and wheelchair accessible, this ten-minute route along well-formed tracks leads to the first lookout which overlooks the gorges of Kanangra Creek and beyond to the high tops of Mt Cloudmaker and the Blue Mountains escarpment, which presents a spectacular vista. The second overlooks rugged ravines at the head of the gorges and Kanangra Falls;
- Waterfall Walk – accessible from the Lookout Walk, this route leads down into a gully where the Kalang Falls splash into a pool; and
- Plateau Walk – turns off before the main lookout and leads into the Kanangra Wilderness and onto the expansive heath-covered Kanangra Tops Plateau. It is possible to walk continuously from this walk to Katoomba and Narrow Neck.

Camping is available on the banks of Morong Creek, at the Boyd River campground, located on Kanangra Road.

== See also ==
- Kanangra Creek
- Protected areas of New South Wales
