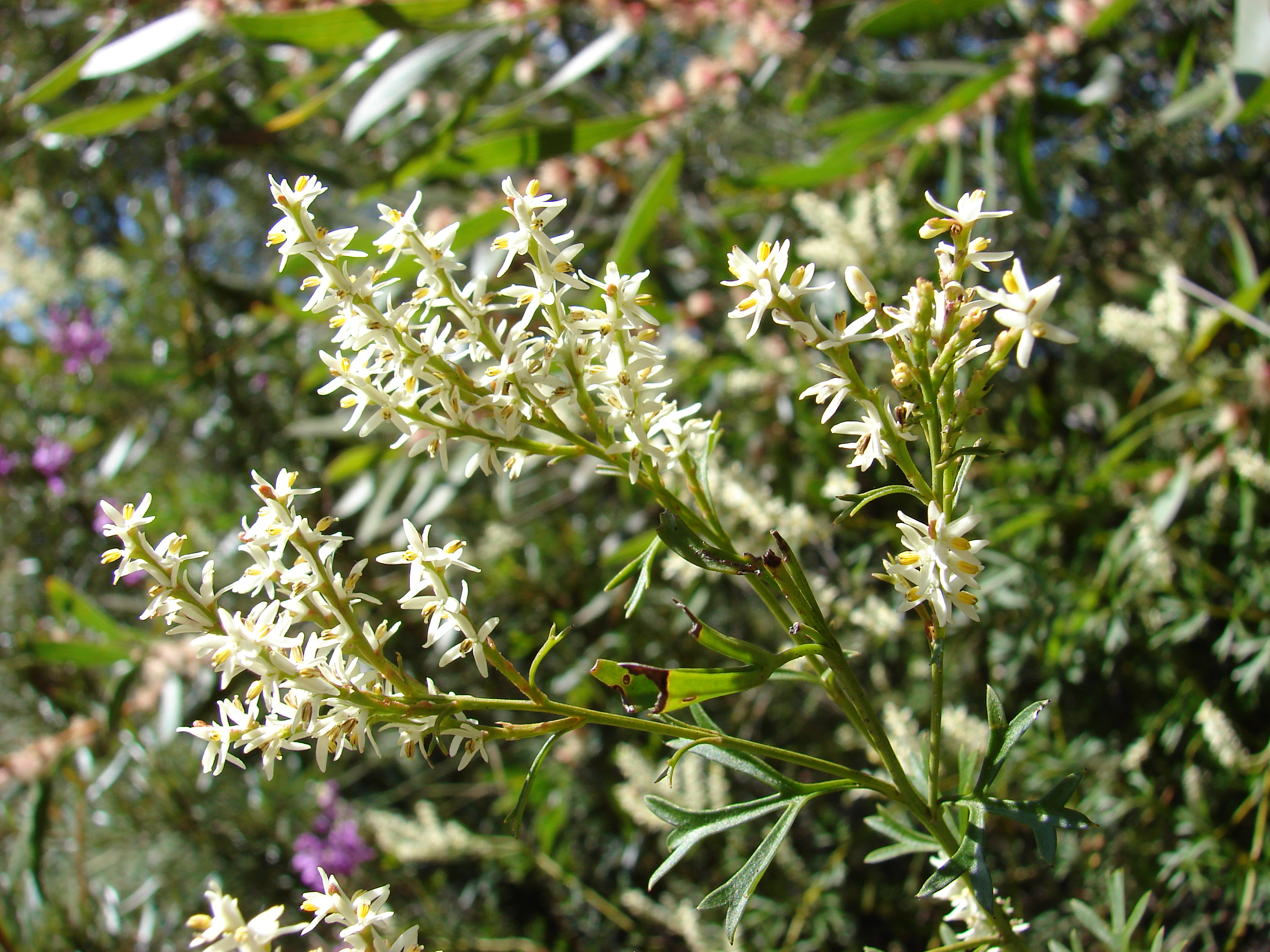
- Symphionema montanum

Scientific classification
- Kingdom: Plantae
- Clade: Tracheophytes
- Clade: Angiosperms
- Clade: Eudicots
- Order: Proteales
- Family: Proteaceae
- Subfamily: Symphionematoideae
- Genus: Symphionema; R.Br.

Species
- See text

Synonyms
- Symphyonema Spreng.

= Symphionema =

Genus of shrubs endemic to Australia

Symphionema is a genus of two species of small shrubs in the family Proteaceae. Both species are endemic to New South Wales in Australia.

Species

- Symphionema montanum R.Br.
- Symphionema paludosum R.Br.
